= Proclamation of the French Republic (September 4, 1870) =

Event in France in 1870

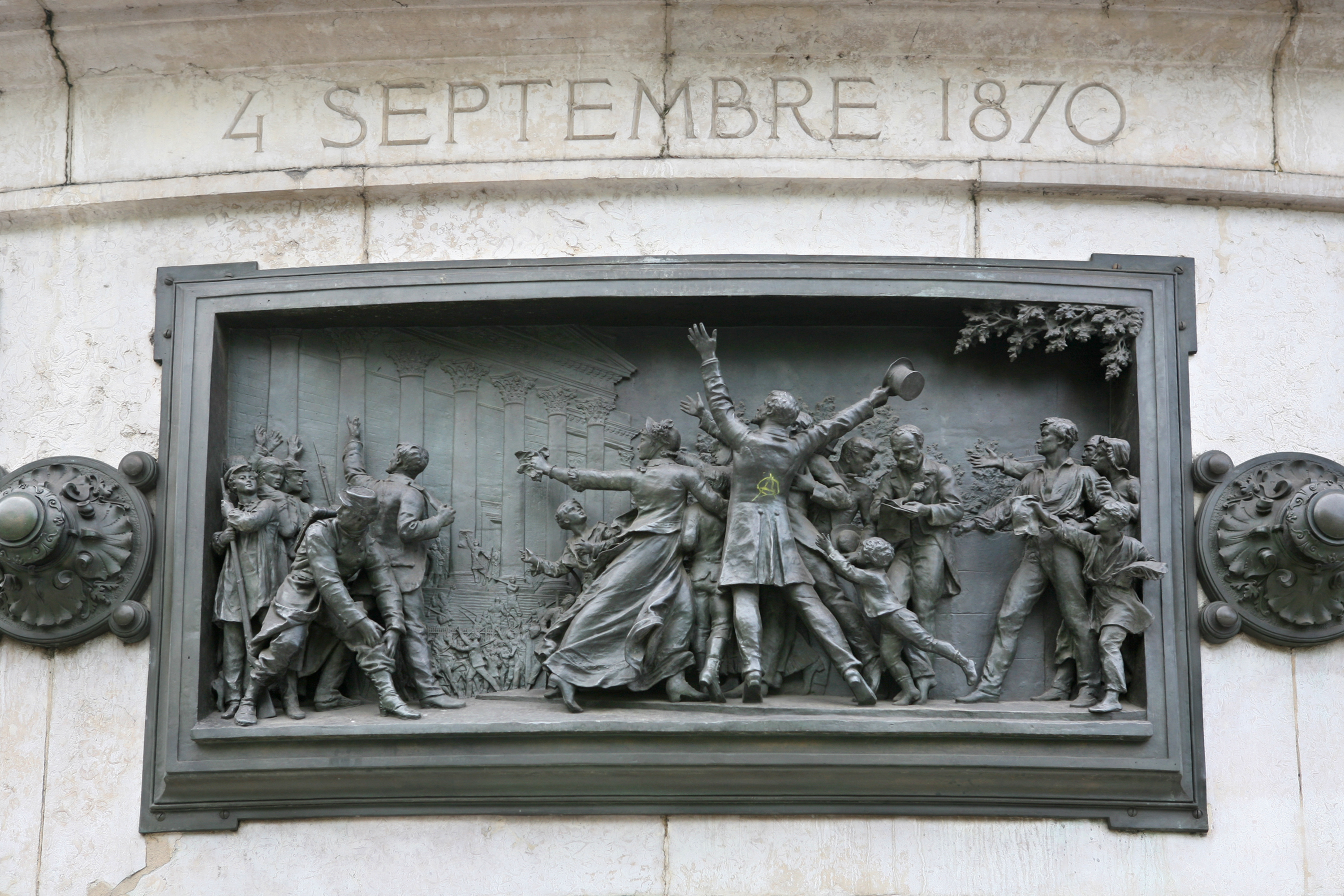
- Bronze high relief by Léopold Morice, Monument à la République, Place de la République, Paris, 1883.
- Date: September 4, 1870
- Location: Paris, France
- Theme: Establishment of the Third Republic, Government of National Defense

The proclamation of the French Republic on September 4, 1870, announced to the French people that the Republic was being reestablished, thereby founding the Third Republic, and causing the downfall of Emperor Napoleon III and the fall of the Second Empire. This event represents the fourth French Revolution, following those of 1789, 1830, and 1848.

French troops were defeated by the Prussian army and subsequently surrounded in Sedan, where Emperor Napoleon III surrendered on September 2. The news of the defeat was received in Paris the following day and caused considerable shock. The indecision of the Council of Ministers, which was led by the Empress Regent, and the Legislative Body, where Orleanist deputy Adolphe Thiers and Republican deputies supported a solution involving a national unity government drawn from the elected national representatives, resulted in a popular uprising.

On the afternoon of September 4, the Palais Bourbon, the seat of the Legislative Body, was stormed. Republican deputies Léon Gambetta and Jules Favre proclaimed the regime's fall and led the crowd to Paris City Hall, where the Third Republic was proclaimed. Meanwhile, the Empress fled the Tuileries Palace. A Government of National Defense was formed, under the presidency of General Trochu, to continue the war against Prussia.

The proclamation of the Republic did not immediately result in stability. The government could not withstand the siege of Paris and signed an armistice in January 1871. Following the Paris Commune uprising and the monarchists' victory in the legislative elections held on February 8, 1871, the new regime appeared weakened.

The founding event of September 4 is often overlooked in collective memory. Rarely celebrated by republican governments, it receives little attention in the extensive historiography of the Third Republic, and is the subject of few studies in its own right. September 4, 1870, differs from other revolutionary episodes in that it did not result in the loss of life or the construction of barricades. Consequently, some historians are reluctant to classify it as a revolution.

== Context ==
=== Tensions with Prussia and the war declaration ===
By May 1870, the Second Empire appeared to be more robust than ever. The French populace expressed overwhelming approval for the liberal reforms initiated by Napoleon III in the May 8 plebiscite, with over 7 million votes in favor. On June 30, the Emperor's Chief of Staff, Émile Ollivier, asserted that "at no other time has the maintenance of peace in Europe been more assured." However, the prospect of conflict with Prussia was revived when Prince Leopold of Hohenzollern became a candidate for the Spanish throne on June 21, 1870, following the throne vacancy for two years. Upon its arrival in Paris on July 5, this news provoked an uproar. France could not tolerate what seemed like encirclement, similar to the situation during the reign of Charles V, given that Leopold was a cousin of the Prussian king, Wilhelm I. On July 6, from the podium of the Legislative Body, Foreign Minister Agénor de Gramont issued an ultimatum to Prussia. The deputies, subsequently joined by the press and public opinion, supported his position, thereby rendering a military conflict inevitable.

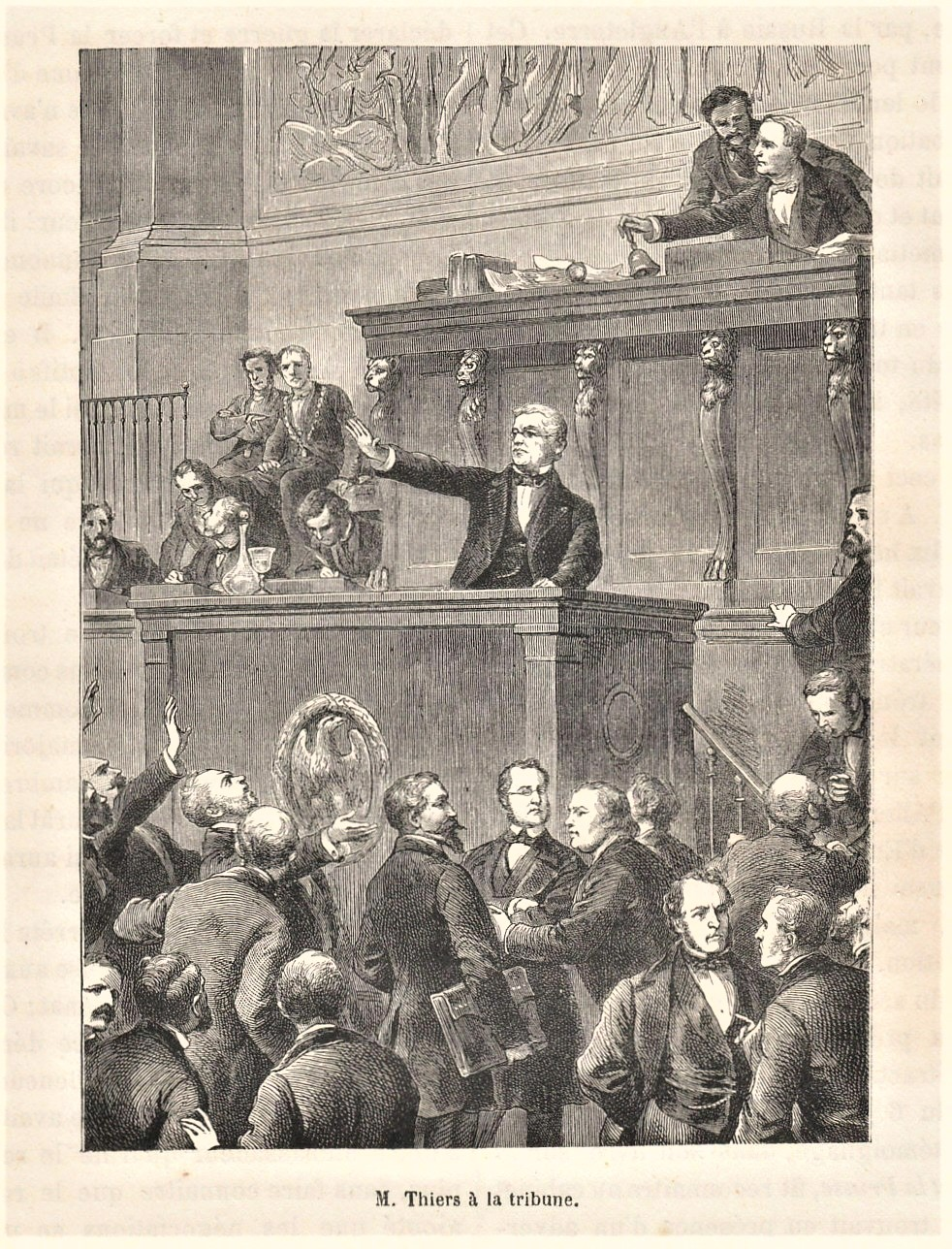
Adolphe Thiers expresses his rejection of war with Prussia.

The withdrawal of Prince Hohenzollern's candidacy on July 12, 1870, did not reduce tensions. With the support of Empress Eugénie, the ultra-Bonapartist deputies, who were opposed to the liberal regime and the peace advocated by Émile Ollivier, pressured France to demand a written commitment of definitive renunciation and guarantees for the future from the King of Prussia. Despite confirming his cousin's renunciation, Wilhelm I refused to comply with France's demands.

For Chancellor Bismarck, a war with France appeared to be the optimal means of increasing Prussian power in Germany. He employed a strategy of calculated ambiguity, modifying the polite response that Wilhelm I had provided in the Ems Dispatch into a more dismissive version. This was interpreted as an insult by French public opinion, which became incensed. Consequently, Napoleon III and Émile Ollivier, who were proponents of peace and the convening of a congress to settle the Franco-Prussian dispute, were drawn into the war.

There were few dissenting voices. From the podium of the Legislative Body, Orleanist deputy Adolphe Thiers criticized the government for "breaking over a matter of sensitivity" when it had already achieved its objective. However, he was constantly interrupted by boos and insults. Similarly, Republican Léon Gambetta condemned the government's refusal to produce documents proving its claim that the country had been insulted. Ultimately, the military credits were approved, and war was declared on Prussia on July 19.

=== Defeat at Sedan and the capture of Napoleon III ===
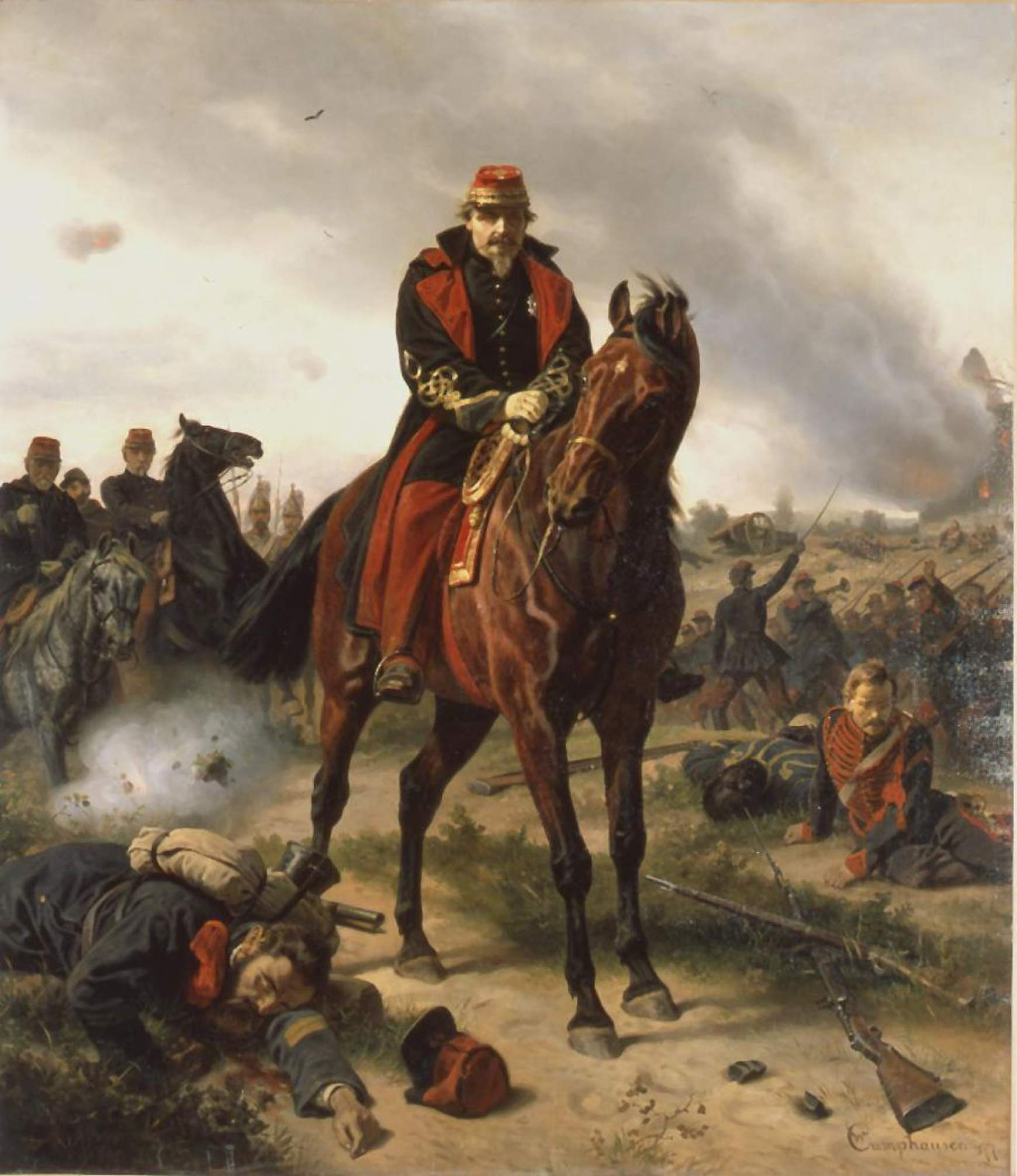
Napoleon III at the Battle of Sedan by German painter Wilhelm Camphausen.

The French army was less well-prepared than the Prussian army and suffered a complete rout due to being outnumbered. On August 3, the Prussian General Staff, under the direction of Helmuth von Moltke, issued an order for troops to cross the border. Six days later, the French forces were defeated at Frœschwiller-Wœrth and were compelled to retreat. The news of this defeat was met with shock and indignation in Paris. On August 9, an incensed assembly assembled before the Legislative Body. However, most Republicans, still optimistic about a military resurgence, declined to initiate a revolution that would be perceived as a betrayal of the army and a rupture in national unity. Subsequent insurrectionary attempts, including one by Gaston Crémieux in Marseille on August 8 and another by the Blanquists in Paris on August 14, similarly failed to gain traction. The French army's defeat was attributed to Émile Ollivier, who was compelled to resign.

The proposal put forth by Republican Jules Favre, which called for the formation of a fifteen-member committee to govern in unity and repel the invasion, was rejected by the deputies. In her capacity as regent, Empress Eugénie appointed Charles Cousin-Montauban, Count of Baliqiao, a Bonapartist and authoritarian figure, to head the government. In the provinces, the French defeats that occurred in the early stages of the conflict also caused surprise, disappointment, and anger. Far-left groups attempted to capitalize on the situation, launching attacks on town halls, seminaries, and Jesuit residences. Incidents were documented in Marseille, Toulon, Montpellier, Nîmes, Mâcon, Beaune, Limoges, Bordeaux, and Périgueux, while in Lyon, some groups considered seceding from the Empire and establishing municipal autonomy. However, the majority of French citizens retained confidence in the emperor.

Marshal Bazaine, the commander-in-chief of the Army of the Rhine, found himself encircled in Metz on August 19 with approximately half of the French troops under his command. The emperor contemplated a strategic withdrawal to Paris, but under considerable pressure from the empress and the Minister of War, who feared such a decision would incite popular unrest, Napoleon III ultimately opted to march to Bazaine's aid with the Army of Châlons, which was under the command of Marshal MacMahon. However, these troops were also surrounded in Sedan. Despite valiant efforts to break out, the emperor ultimately surrendered on September 2.

== Events (September 3–5, 1870) ==
=== From the afternoon of September 3 to the night of September 4 ===
==== Announcement of the defeat to the Empress and ministers’ meeting ====
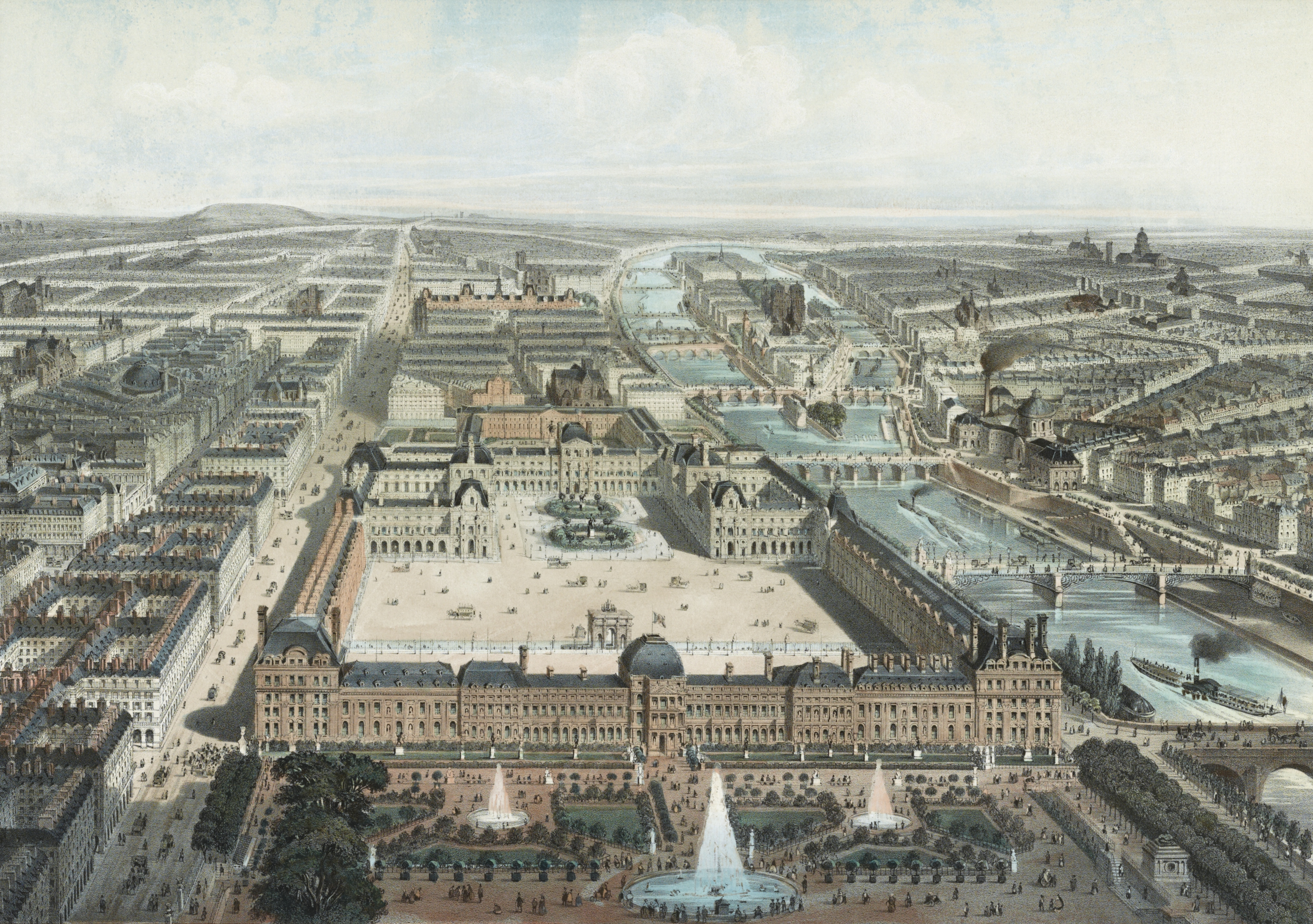
The Tuileries Palace in the 1860s.

On the afternoon of September 3, 1870, Henri Chevreau, the Minister of the Interior, proceeded to the Tuileries Palace to apprise the Empress of the contents of numerous telegrams from mayors and sub-prefects. These telegrams detailed the movements of French soldiers in retreat through various towns in the north and east of France. In the palace corridors, he encountered the Director of Telegraphs, who owned a dispatch in which Napoleon III informed his wife of his capture and the defeat at Sedan. Henri Chevreau delivered the dispatch to the Empress, who promptly decided to convene a Council of Ministers.

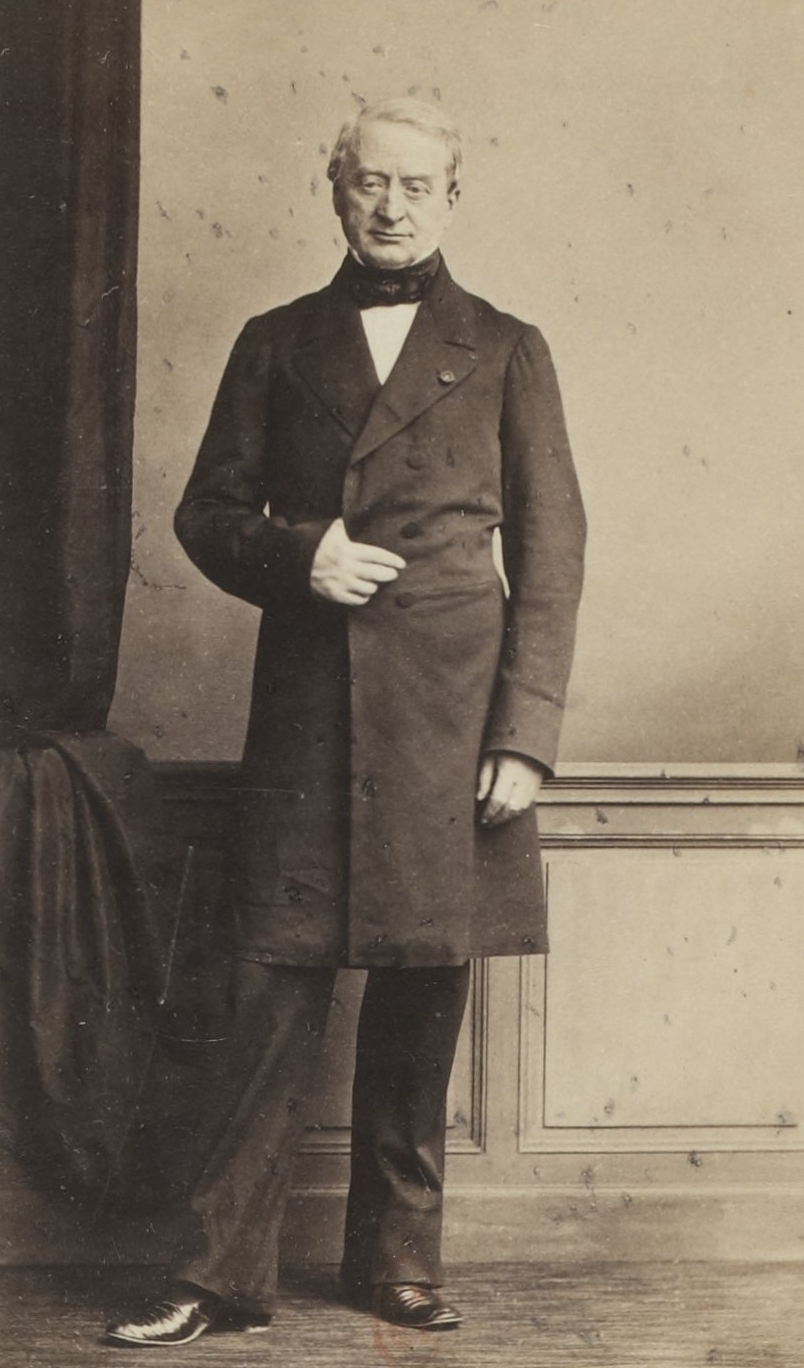
Eugène Schneider, President of the Legislative Body.

The ministers assembled at 6 p.m. to discuss the gravity of the disaster, yet no decisions were reached regarding the subsequent course of action. The potential of the Empress and a government delegation relocating to a provincial city was contemplated, yet ultimately dismissed due to concerns that it might be perceived as a betrayal by the people of Paris, particularly in light of the Prussian army's advancement towards the capital. Similarly, Eugène Schneider, president of the Legislative Body, who was entitled to participate in the council with a consultative voice, used a recess in the session to propose to Eugénie that executive power be transferred to a commission elected by the deputies. He believed that this course of action would circumvent a revolution and placate the public by removing those responsible for the defeat. However, the Empress rejected this proposal. The ministers, with the support of Eugène Schneider, agreed to postpone the convening of the Legislative Body until noon the following day, after another scheduled Council of Ministers for 8 a.m. Additionally, a hastily drafted proclamation to the Parisians announcing the defeat, written by the Minister of Agriculture and Commerce, Clément Duvernois, was also approved.

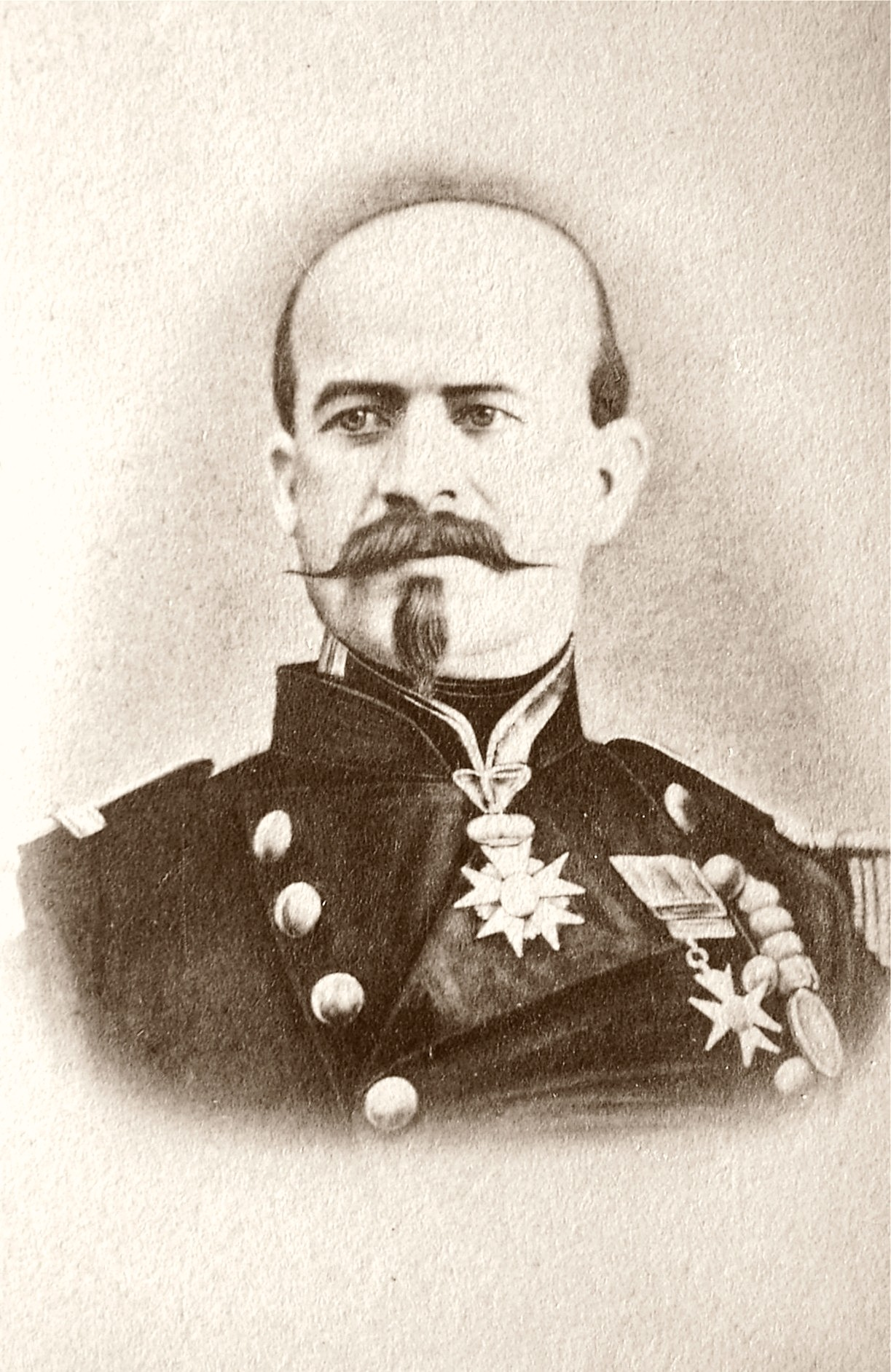
General Trochu, military governor of Paris.

In his essay, Pierre Cornut-Gentille posited that the Empress's indecision was a consequence of her inability to make decisions without first ascertaining the intentions of General Trochu, the military governor of Paris. Despite Henri Chevreau's insistence, Trochu declined to meet with her that evening. For numerous Bonapartists, this refusal constituted evidence of the governor's perfidy. They accused him of having conspired with the Republicans for an extended period to destabilize the regime. However, Pierre Cornut-Gentille posited that Trochu's demeanor was more likely a consequence of the distrust that the Empress and the Minister of War had exhibited towards him since his appointment. Historian Éric Anceau posits that General Trochu "did not want to compromise his popularity by associating himself with the regent amid the general collapse and preferred to present himself, when the time came, as a savior." The military governor of the capital and his staff engaged in efforts to accelerate the completion of Paris's defensive fortifications throughout the evening and night.

==== Morning of September 4: The fall of the regime ====
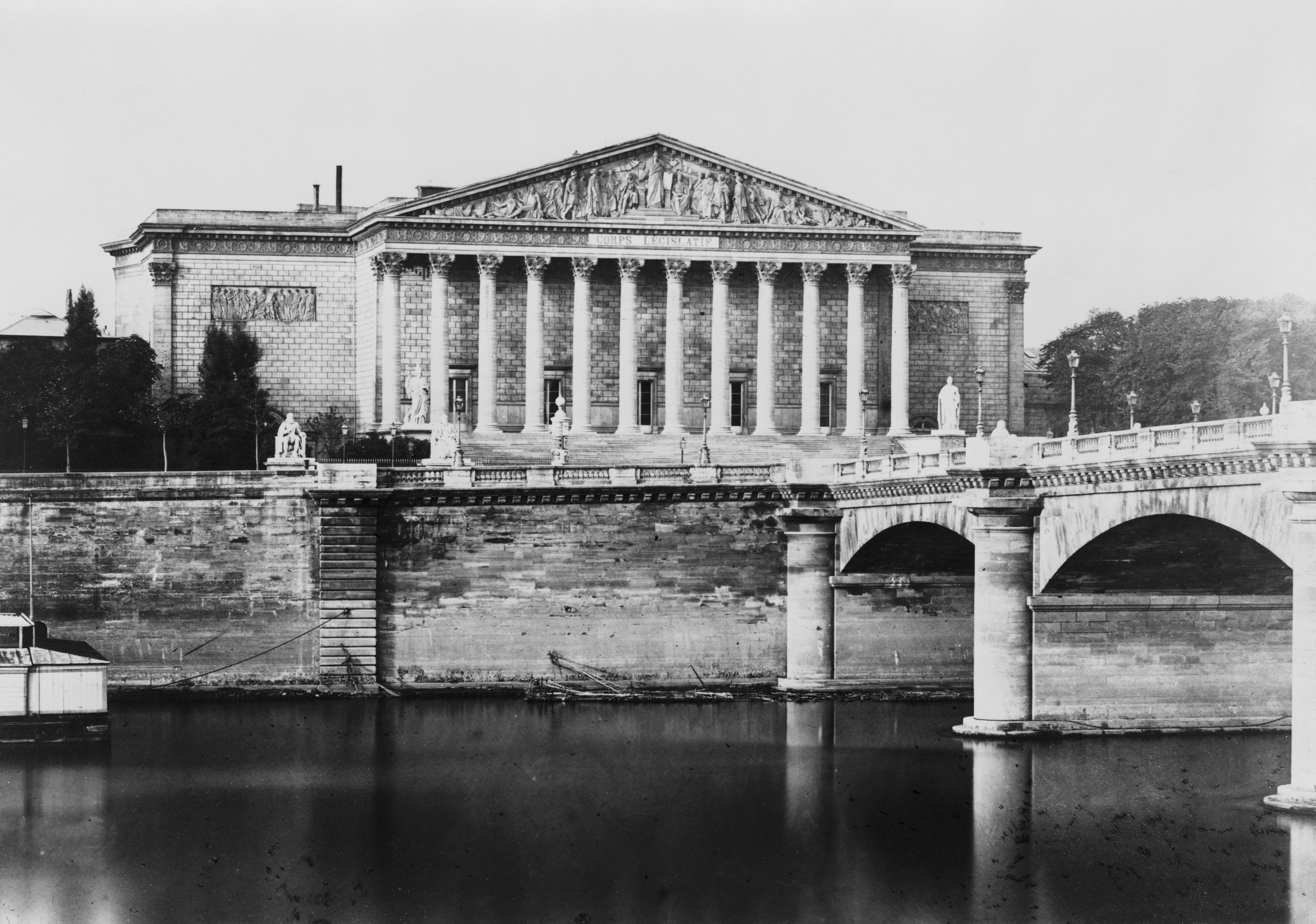
The Palais Bourbon under the Second Empire.

The news of the French defeat was conveyed to the Palais Bourbon, the seat of the Legislative Body, at the precise moment the Empress received Napoleon III's telegram. A considerable number of deputies congregated around Adolphe Thiers. Despite having been subjected to criticism for his pacifist stance a few weeks earlier, he was now regarded by many as the man who had been sent by Providence. A group of republican deputies, including Jules Favre, Louis-Antoine Garnier-Pagès, Léon Gambetta, Jules Ferry, and Joseph Magnin, approached Thiers to propose the formation of a "provisional national defense committee." This committee would consist of deputies from various political factions, except for Bonapartists. In their view, the humiliating capitulation left the Regent and the government with no alternative but to relinquish power. Only a figure like Thiers, they believed, could unite people under his name. For Adolphe Thiers, the only viable outcome was a peace treaty with Prussia, albeit an unfavorable one. Despite agreeing with the concept of a more expansive government that would ultimately result in the emperor's downfall, he declined to be part of it, citing his reluctance to bear the consequences of a war he had striven to avert. In this stance, Thiers asserted that neither he nor the Republicans should assume responsibility.

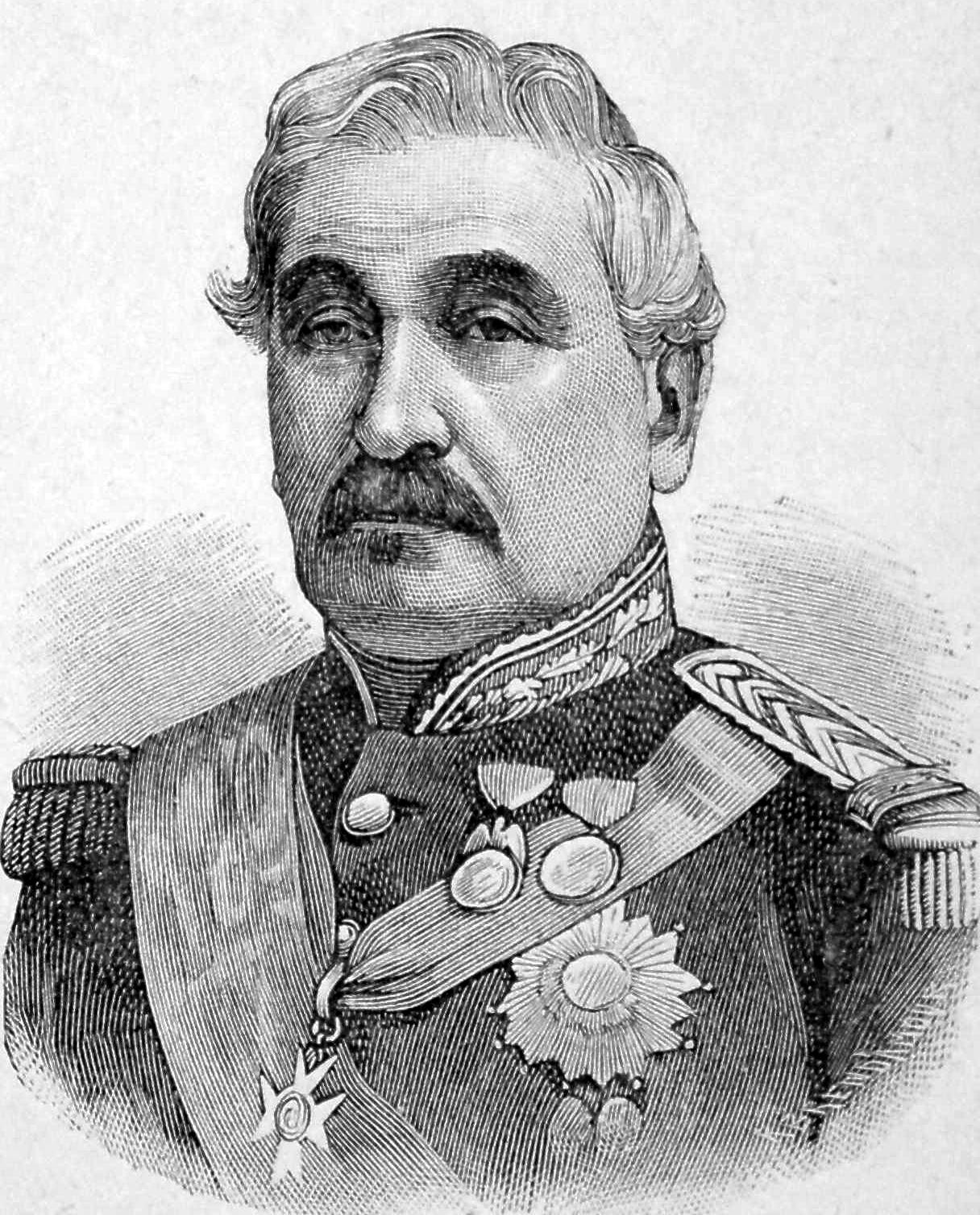
Minister of War Charles Cousin-Montauban, Count of Palikao.

Jules Favre then put forth the proposal of a triumvirate, comprising the President of the Legislative Body, Eugène Schneider; the Minister of War, Charles Cousin-Montauban; and the Governor of Paris, General Trochu. Before their separation, Adolphe Thiers and the five Republicans pledged to convene once more, following the consultation of their respective constituencies on the matter.

==== Popular gatherings and republican embarrassment ====
As night fell, spontaneous gatherings began to form in the streets and boulevards of Paris. A considerable number of individuals participated in a demonstration that commenced at Place de la Bastille and subsequently dispersed without incident at the hands of law enforcement personnel in the vicinity of Rue Montmartre. The citizens of Paris initially directed their ire towards Napoleon III, whom they accused of cowardice and treachery. In the early evening, crowds congregated at Place de la Concorde and the nearby bridge, anticipating that the Legislative Body would convene to declare the emperor's downfall.

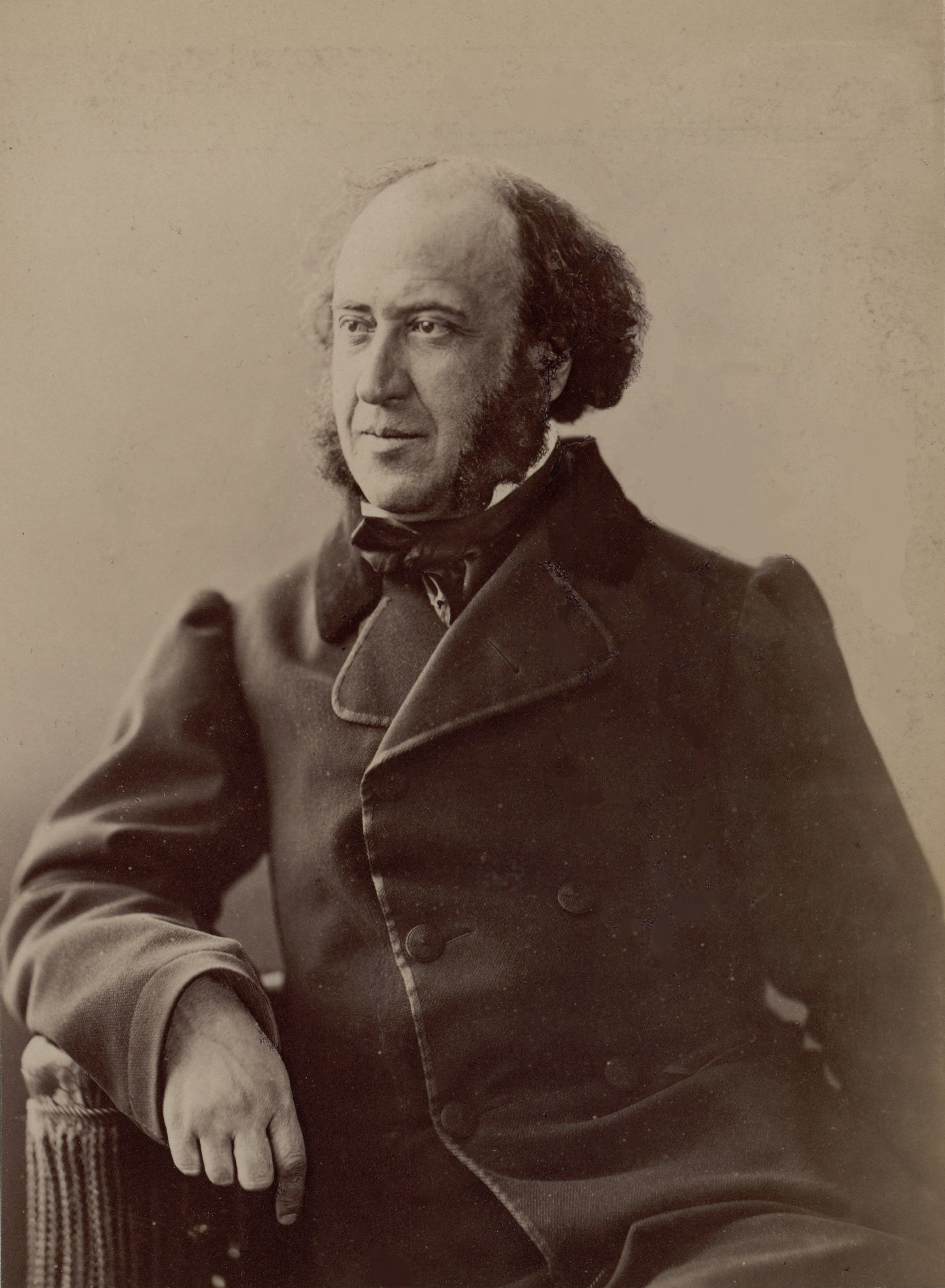
Deputy Jules Simon.

In the Palais Bourbon, where a sense of anticipation was palpable, the republican deputies found themselves in a tenuous position. A significant number of politicians rejected the notion of the War Minister's involvement in the prospective government, citing his role in the calamitous events that had transpired. His continued role could incite an insurrection, which they still sought to avoid. In contrast to the revolutionary republicans, who did not participate in the Assembly, the moderate republicans of the Legislative Body had long advocated for democratic ascension to power. Endorsing a revolutionary uprising would therefore represent a betrayal of that principle. However, aware of the urgent need to promote a new government, the republicans refused to assume sole responsibility for it, fearing the humiliation of defeat. As Jules Simon later acknowledged, the intention was to ensure that the Republic would not inherit the country's misfortunes.

Instead of the aforementioned proposal, a unity government was put forth, this time with the inclusion of Bonapartists, as mandated by the Legislative Body. The Orleanist Adolphe Thiers would be the preeminent figure within this government, which would consist of nine members: four republican deputies and four Bonapartist deputies. In light of the reports indicating the resolve of various groups congregated around the Palais Bourbon, it became imperative to convene the Legislative Body during the night to proclaim the transfer of executive authority to the Parisians at dawn. While some deputies sought President Eugène Schneider's consent to convene the session without delay, Léon Gambetta endeavored to reassure the assembly gathered outside the Palais Bourbon.

==== Night session of the Legislative Body ====
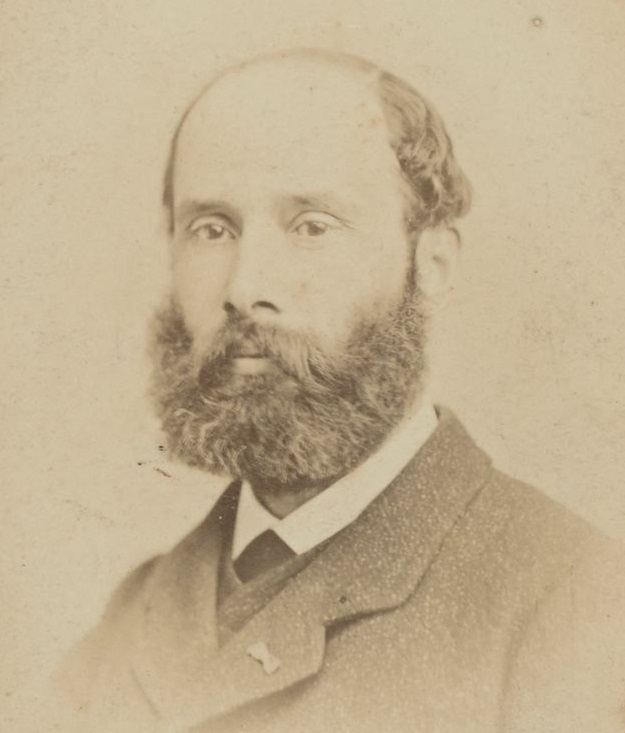
Deputy Émile de Kératry.

In the late evening of September 3, a delegation of 36 deputies, led by Émile de Kératry, an Orleanist cavalry officer aligned with the Republicans, and Ernest Dréolle, an authoritarian Bonapartist, demanded that President Eugène Schneider, who was dining in his apartments at the Hôtel de Lassay, immediately convene the Legislative Body. Schneider, "divided between his fidelity to the imperial couple and his principles", ultimately acquiesced and proclaimed the convocation of a session at midnight.

At approximately 11 p.m., the War Minister, Count de Palikao, arrived at the Hôtel de Lassay in a state of considerable agitation. Like other ministers who were present, he censured Schneider for convening the session without first obtaining the Council of Ministers' approval, particularly given that, according to him, no action could be taken without Empress Eugénie's authorization. Schneider, however, engaged in multiple consultations to reach a compromise. Republican deputy Antoine-Léonce Guyot-Montpayroux informed him of the following: "If a solution can be reached tonight, and if tomorrow's official journal contains a proclamation and resolutions that can quell public unrest, and if there is a resolution placing power in the hands of the Legislative Body, I am convinced that General Trochu will support the Assembly. In that case, there will be no revolution in the streets." "Conversely, should Paris awaken tomorrow without any substantial resolutions, a revolution may ensue." Following contributions from deputies Ernest Dréolle and Pierre Calvet-Rognat, Palikao ultimately consented to attend the session, which commenced at 1 a.m. on September 4, 1870.

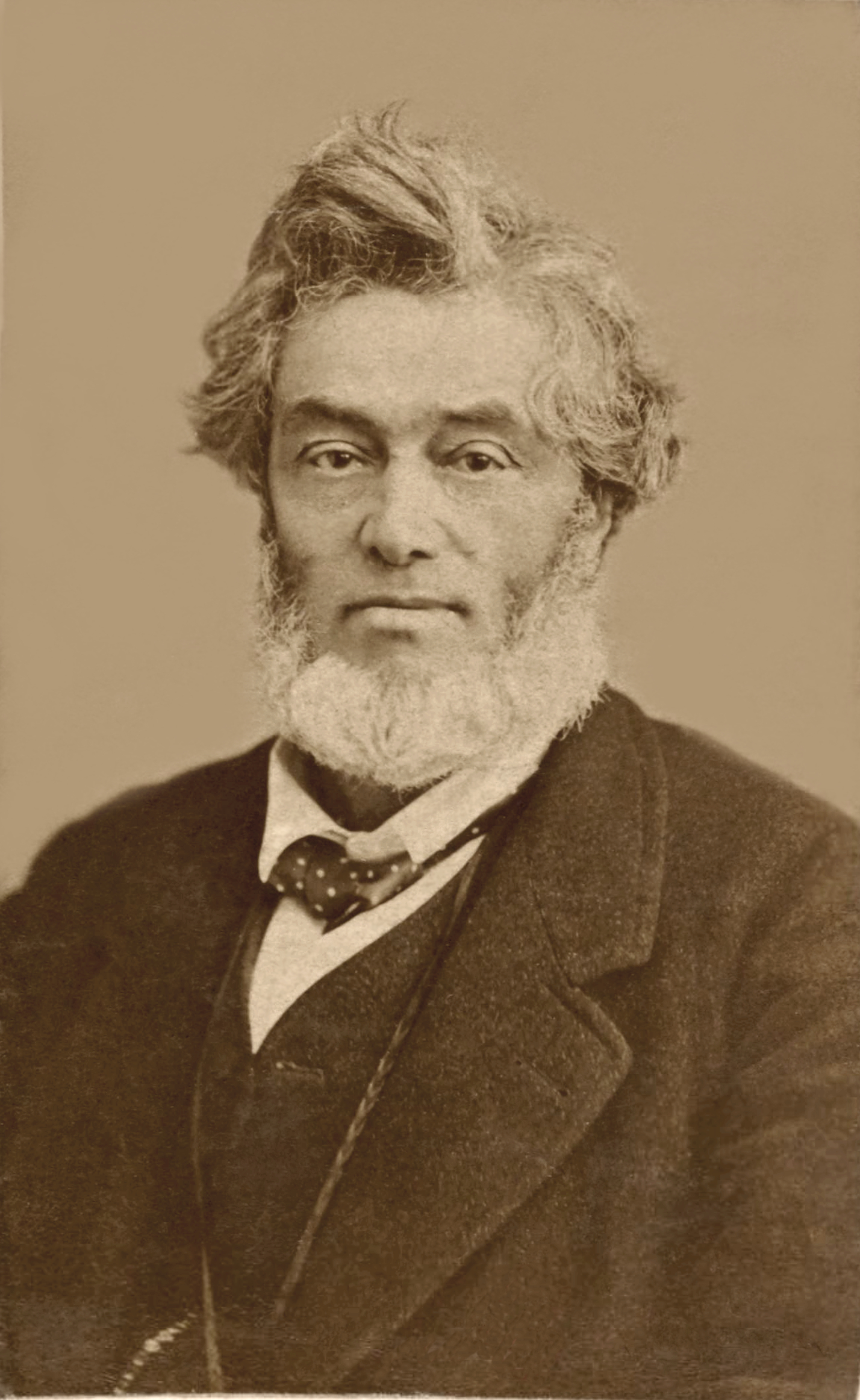
Deputy Jules Favre.

The War Minister was the first to speak. He acknowledged that the ministers had not yet engaged in deliberations regarding the decisions to be made and requested a postponement of the session until noon on the same day. The republican Jules Favre, who followed him at the podium, did not oppose the postponement but presented, on behalf of all republicans, a three-article motion signed by 27 deputies, which he intended to submit to a vote at the next session:

Louis-Napoleon Bonaparte and his dynasty are declared deposed from power. The Legislative Body shall appoint a commission… vested with all governmental powers and charged with resisting the invasion and driving the enemy from the territory. General Trochu shall remain governor-general of Paris.

The session was adjourned at 1:20 a.m.; however, everyone understood that, given the government's inertia, it was highly likely that the majority would soon transfer executive power from the regent to a government chosen by the Assembly. As Pierre Cornut-Gentille put it: "It was necessary to give Thiers and the liberal Bonapartists time to craft a motion acceptable to the majority."

=== September 4 ===
==== Council of Ministers meeting ====
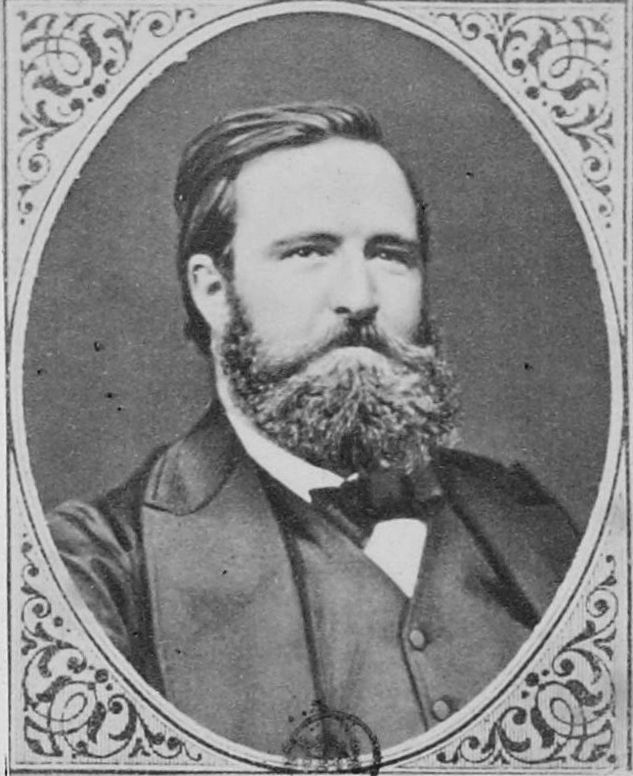
Clément Duvernois, Minister of Agriculture and Commerce.

The scheduled 8 a.m. Council of Ministers meeting was postponed due to visits from General Trochu and Ferdinand de Lesseps, Eugénie's distant cousin. After consulting with his colleague Émile de Girardin, de Lesseps attempted to persuade her to consider a temporary withdrawal, but she ultimately declined.

During the Council, the Minister of Agriculture and Commerce, Clément Duvernois, was the first to propose the use of force, including the declaration of a state of siege, as a means of apprehending republican leaders and thereby quelling any revolutionary movements. This proposal was rejected by the Empress, who was opposed to any use of violence. Subsequently, Eugène Schneider endorsed the proposal put forth by Louis Buffet, a former finance minister, who had drafted a text overnight with the assistance of other deputies. This proposal sought to transfer executive power to a commission elected by the Assembly. Despite the support of Minister Jules Brame, the proposal was not accepted. However, a portion of it was retained. The ministers adopted the idea of a regency council, which would be elected by the Assembly. This council would also appoint a lieutenant general of the council, Count Palikao. Furthermore, the Empress would retain her position within this council.

This proposal was subsequently rejected by the deputies who convened with the War Minister shortly before noon at the Palais Bourbon. It was then resolved that a delegation of six deputies, led by Louis Buffet and Napoleon Daru, would proceed to the Tuileries Palace to persuade the Empress to reconsider her stance. Despite her initial reluctance, she ultimately consented to relinquish her position on the condition that Minister Palikao would also endorse this decision.

==== New session of the Legislative Body ====
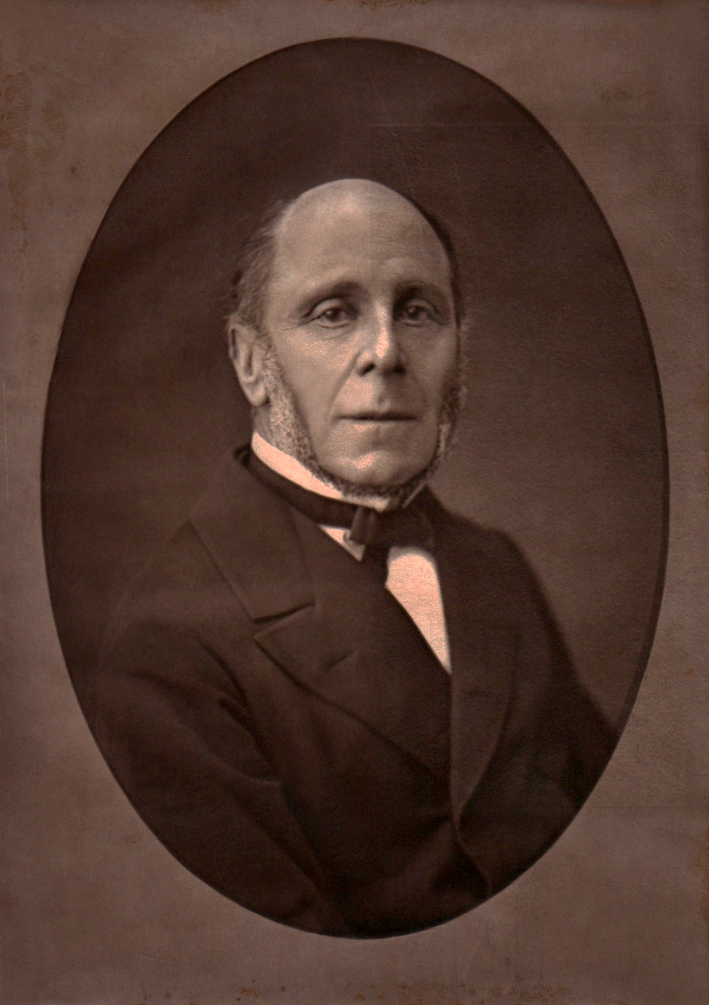
Louis Martel, rapporteur for the committee examining the motions tabled.

On the morning of September 4, Parisians discovered the Council of Ministers' declaration, which had been posted during the night on the walls of public buildings. The newspapers had encouraged the public to assemble in large numbers in front of the Assembly to demand the emperor's deposition, and the number of demonstrators continued to grow throughout the morning. However, the crowd did not exhibit aggressive behavior, instead displaying a "euphoric and gently defiant atmosphere." A substantial security contingent, comprising approximately 5,000 personnel (including police officers, gendarmes, and military personnel), was deployed in the vicinity by the head of government, Charles Cousin-Montauban, to guarantee the safety of the deputies.

At 13:15, President Schneider commenced the session of the Legislative Body. Cousin-Montauban and Deputy Adolphe Thiers alternated in presenting their respective proposals. They concurred on the establishment of a government appointed by the Chamber. However, the former proposed that he be designated lieutenant general of this council, whereas the latter advocated for an institutional transformation by suggesting the convocation of a constituent assembly at the earliest convenience. Jules Favre, for his part, reiterated his proposal to depose the Emperor, which had been submitted during the night session.

The gravity of the situation was acknowledged, and the three proposals were promptly referred to a commission with the mandate of drafting a text that would garner substantial support. The commission, by a unanimous vote, approved Thiers' text with slight modifications and appointed Louis Martel as its rapporteur. The Chamber then elected a commission composed of five members chosen by the Legislative Body, stating, "Given the circumstances, the Chamber elects a commission composed of five members chosen by the Legislative Body." The commission will be responsible for appointing ministers. Once circumstances permit, the nation will be called upon to elect a Constituent Assembly to decide on the form of government. However, as the commission prepared to return to the chamber, they learned that the palace had been overrun and that no further session could be held there.

==== The invasion of the Palais Bourbon ====
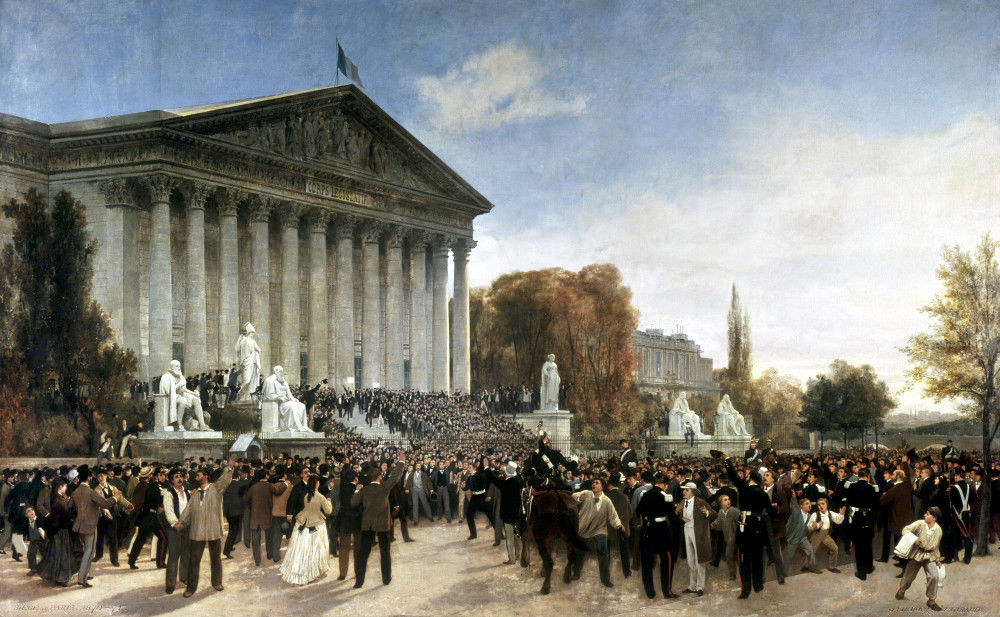
The crowd in front of the Legislative Body on the morning of September 4, 1870, painted by Jacques Guiaud and Jules Didier.

The demonstration outside the Palais Bourbon had a significant impact on the political landscape, demonstrating to both the government and the most loyal Bonapartist deputies the strength of public opinion. While the majority of Parisians assembled in front of the palace were driven by concerns or a desire to observe the unfolding events, Blanquists and other revolutionaries mingled with the crowd, aiming to accelerate the collapse of the Empire and finally achieve the popular and egalitarian democracy that had failed in 1848.

At the commencement of the Legislative Body's session, the public galleries were at full capacity. The Republican Party had ensured the attendance of numerous supporters, including former Second Republic revolutionary deputies such as Jules Miot and Étienne Arago, who advocated for insurrection. Outside the building, the crowd's agitation increased, and General de Caussade, responsible for commanding the operations to maintain order, proved to be ill-equipped to handle the situation. De Caussade was described as an "honorable soldier, but old, slow, sick, without authority or vigor", rendering him ill-suited to the task at hand. Once the gates were opened, it became impossible to stem the flow of demonstrators who flooded the gardens and hallways of the palace. Several National Guardsmen and activists took over the galleries during the suspension of the session, determined to prevent the resumption of debates.

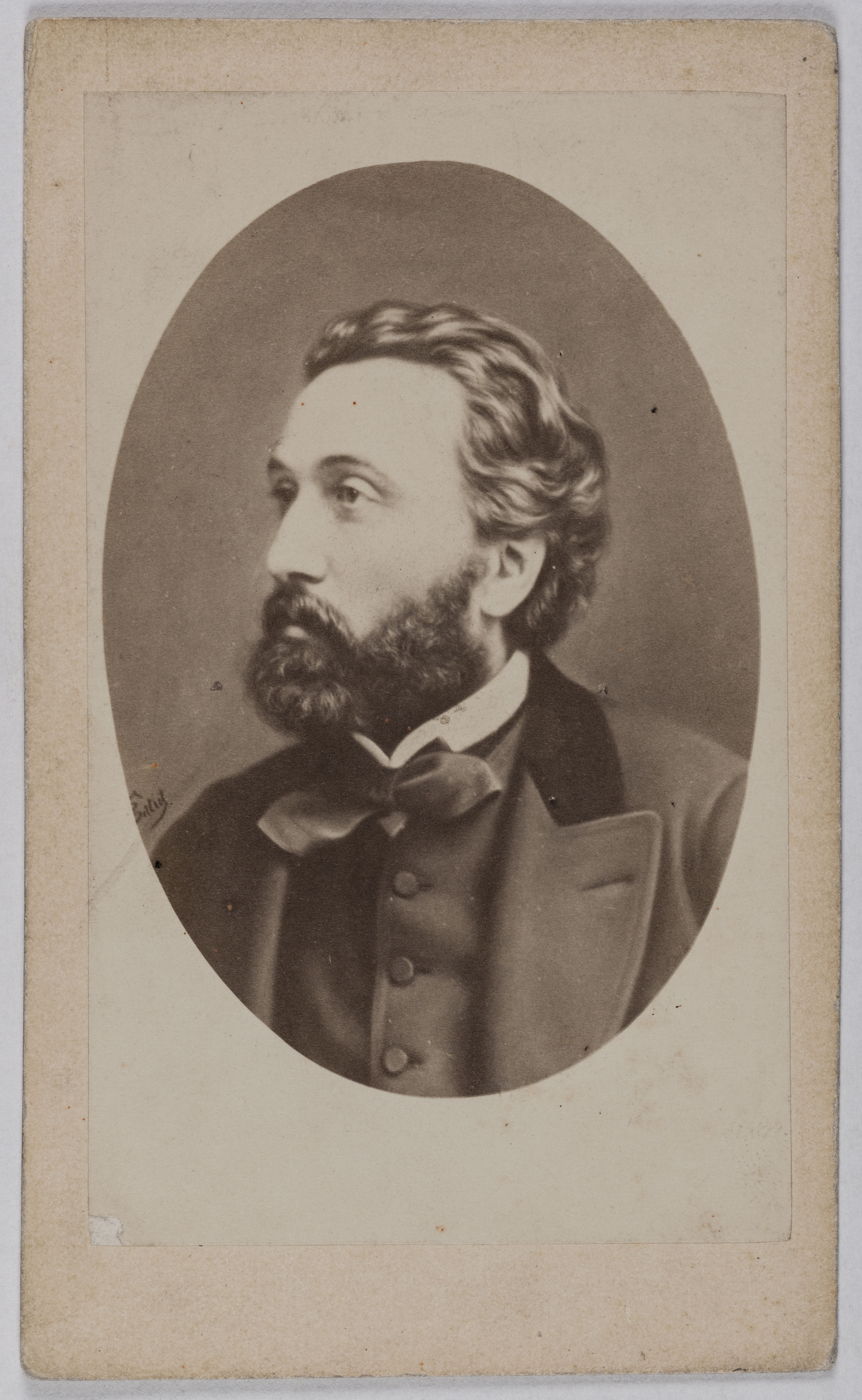
Republican deputy Léon Gambetta.

Republican deputies, including Léon Gambetta, attempted to persuade the assembly to engage in deliberations without external influence, suggesting that a vote on the emperor's deposition was imminent. At approximately 3 p.m., as the tension had slightly subsided and the deputies were awaiting the return of the Martel commission, a loud noise was heard: the door facing the presidential tribune exploded, and numerous demonstrators surged in and occupied the deputies' benches. Joseph Magnin and a few National Guardsmen protected President Schneider as he was evacuated. Léon Gambetta, seeking to maintain control of the situation, ascended the tribune and declared, "Citizens, sufficient time has been afforded to the national representation to pronounce the deposition. We, the legitimate power born from free universal suffrage, declare that Louis-Napoleon Bonaparte and his dynasty have forever ceased to reign over France."

This declaration, which was at odds with the position he had espoused just a few minutes earlier, seemed to be the sole means of pacifying the crowd and quelling the insurrection. In turn, Jules Favre exhorted the demonstrators to refrain from inciting a civil war. Gambetta and he both asserted that the proclamation of the Republic should not occur at the Palais Bourbon, but rather at the City Hall.

==== The Empress's escape ====
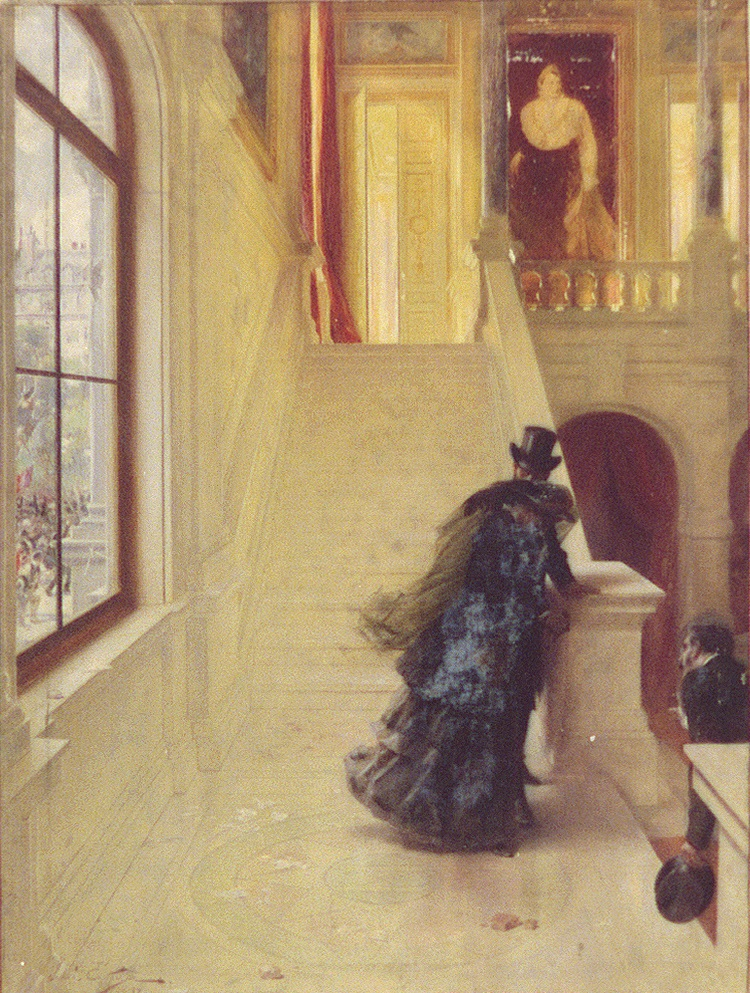
Empress Eugenie leaving the Tuileries Palace, in a painting by André Castaigne.

During the events at the Palais Bourbon, the Empress Regent was dining at the Tuileries Palace with a group of loyalists, who were unaware of any dispatches that had arrived. One of the guests, Ferdinand de Lesseps, proceeded directly to the Legislative Body to inquire about the situation, while the chamberlain, Joseph de Lezay-Marnésia, was charged with the task of bringing back Paris's police prefect, Joseph Marie Pietri.

Interior Minister Henri Chevreau arrived at the Tuileries with a series of unfavorable developments for the Empress. A recently received dispatch informed him that the Republic had been proclaimed that very morning in Lyon, where the red flag had been raised over the City Hall. Furthermore, he provided an account of the commencement of the incursion into the Palais Bourbon, while indicating to the Empress that a considerable number of Bonapartist deputies were aligning themselves with Adolphe Thiers' motion. Upon his arrival at the Tuileries, Prefect Pietri observed that the crowd was beginning to assemble at the palace gates and that, without using weapons, it would be impossible to prevent an invasion. Empress Eugénie, in a state of acquiescence, concurred with the decision to evacuate the palace.

Her extraction was conducted with haste. Given the impossibility of exiting via the Tuileries or the Seine quays amid the crowd, Eugénie was led through the Grande Galerie of the Louvre by Charles Étienne Conti, the emperor's chief of staff; Costantino Nigra, the Italian ambassador; and Richard Klemens von Metternich, the Austrian ambassador. They then proceeded to Place Saint-Germain-l'Auxerrois, accompanied by the latter two. Accompanied by her reader, Adélaïde Lebreton, she procured transportation in the form of a fiacre and ultimately sought refuge at the residence of a close acquaintance of the imperial family, Dr. Thomas W. Evans. On the morning of September 5, he was responsible for organizing the Empress's escape. Eugénie traveled under the false identity of a sick woman whom her brother, nurse, and doctor were taking to England for treatment. The small group arrived in Deauville on September 7 before embarking the next day on an English yacht at the port of Trouville.

==== Proclamation of the Republic at the City Hall ====
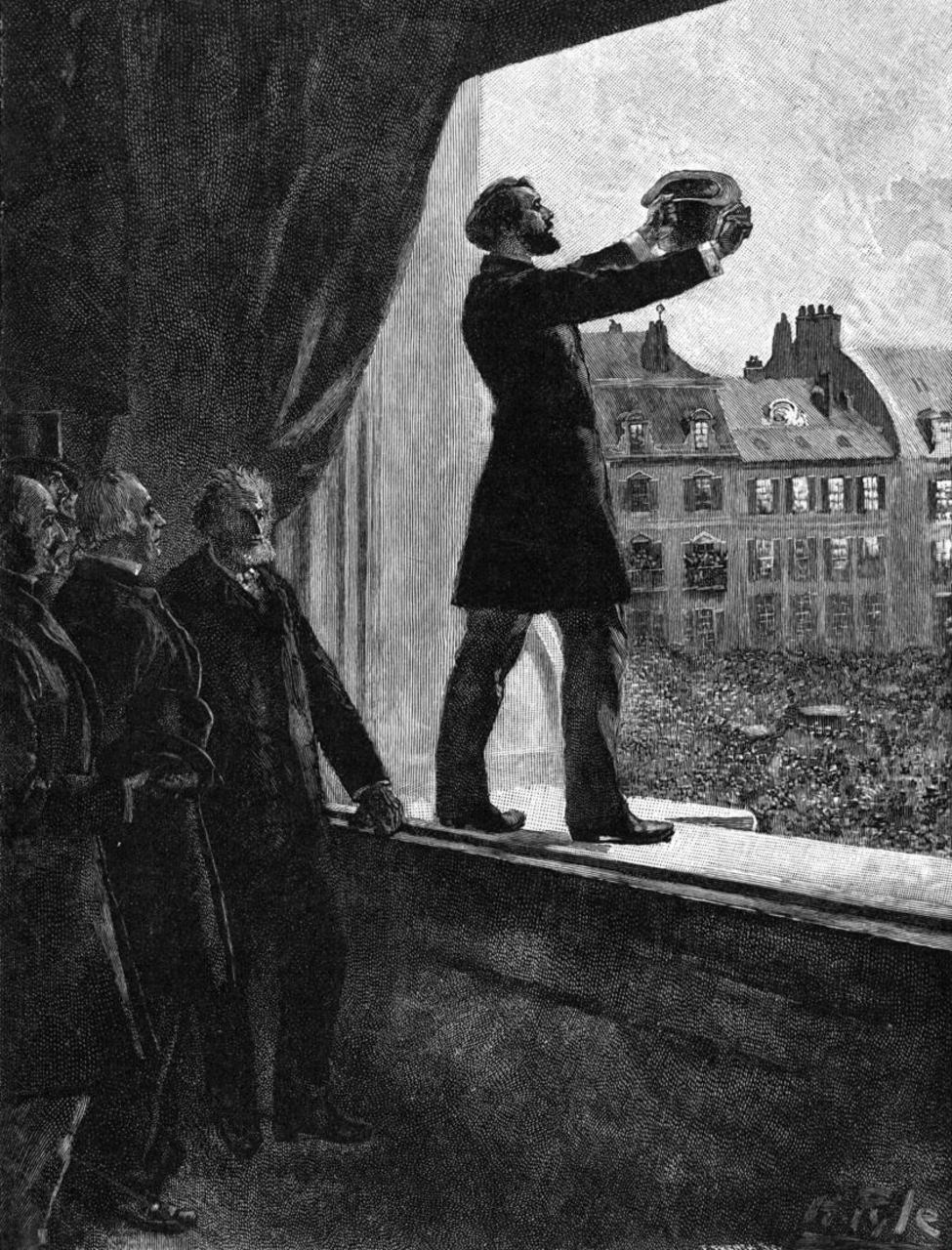
Léon Gambetta proclaiming the Republic at Paris City Hall, September 4, 1870.

The demonstrators, proceeding from the Palais Bourbon to the City Hall, divided into two groups: one led by Jules Ferry and Jules Favre on foot along the right bank, and the other following Léon Gambetta, who traveled in an open carriage along the quays of the left bank. They convened in front of the City Hall at 3:55 p.m.

The crowd entered the building with great enthusiasm and without any violent behavior. Some revolutionary leaders, spearheaded by Jean-Baptiste Millière, formulated a list of prospective ministers, which they disseminated and had the crowd endorse. Nevertheless, the republican deputies were adamant that a government dominated by extremists was unacceptable. Jules Favre, standing on a bench, had the Republic acclaimed and thereby regained control of the situation. The republican deputies, gathered in a small room overlooking the square, made a series of urgent decisions. Étienne Arago, who enjoyed great popularity, was appointed mayor of Paris. Deputy Ernest Picard drafted, under the supervision of his colleagues, a proclamation that was immediately handed to Antoine-Léonce Guyot-Montpayroux to be printed and posted as soon as possible:

Frenchmen!

The People have outpaced the Chamber, which hesitated. To save the endangered Fatherland, they have demanded the Republic.

They have placed their representatives not in power but in peril.

The Republic defeated the invasion in 1792, and the Republic was proclaimed.

The Revolution is carried out in the name of law and public safety.

Citizens, watch over the City entrusted to you; tomorrow, you will be, along with the army, the avengers of the Fatherland!

City Hall of Paris, September 4, 1870.

Signed: Emmanuel Arago, Crémieux, Dorian, Jules Favre, Jules Ferry, Guyot-Montpayroux, Léon Gambetta, Garnier-Pagès, Magnin, Ordinaire, Tachard, Pelletan, E. Picard, Jules Simon.

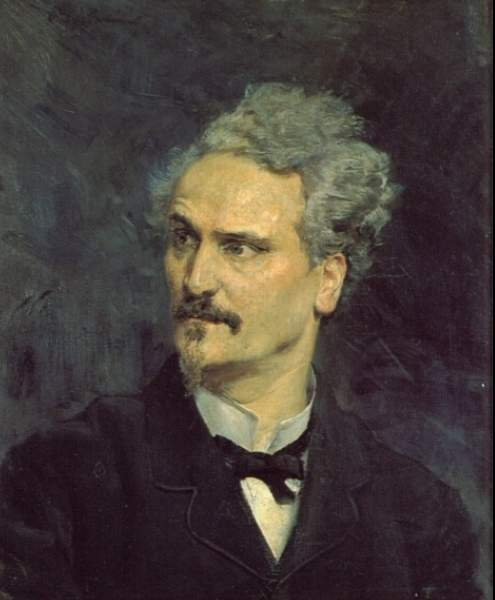
Henri Rochefort, painted by Giovanni Boldini in 1882.

It was subsequently resolved that the new government would be constituted exclusively of deputies elected in Paris, thereby ensuring its legitimacy. This proposal had the advantage for the republican leaders by allowing them to retain the majority of their deputies in Paris, where they had been elected since 1869. In addition, several of them, including Jules Favre, Jules Ferry, Adolphe Crémieux, Louis-Antoine Garnier-Pagès, and Emmanuel Arago, had been elected as deputies of Paris before choosing a provincial constituency in accordance with the law allowing multiple candidacies. The revolutionary polemicist Henri Rochefort, who had also been elected as a Paris deputy the previous year during a by-election following Gambetta's choice of Bouches-du-Rhône, was not an obstacle to this proposal. Moderate Republicans saw it as a way to neutralize the far left by integrating it into the government, despite Rochefort's continual attacks on republican leaders in his articles. Rochefort, recently released from Sainte-Pélagie prison after serving a sentence of several months, was transported by his supporters to the City Hall, where he appeared wearing a red sash. After initial hesitation, he ultimately accepted a position in the government.

Deputies Alexandre Glais-Bizoin and Daniel Wilson were dispatched to the Louvre to persuade General Trochu to assume the role of Minister of War. This was deemed crucial by republican leaders, given the necessity of placing a military figure who was popular and respected by the army in this position. Trochu accepted the proposal on the condition that he would lead the government, given the critical military situation in which France found itself at the time, facing invasion.

The decisions were rapidly forthcoming. Émile de Kératry was appointed prefect of the police of Paris, and François-Frédéric Steenackers assumed control of the telegraphs. The proclamation of the Republic, delivered by Antoine-Léonce Guyot-Montpayroux to the national printing house, where all the workers were absent as they were participating in a demonstration, was eventually printed in the offices of the newspaper La Liberté. It was also transmitted via telegraph to all French regions.

==== Disappearance of the Legislative Body and Senate ====
While the proclamation of the Republic was taking place at the City Hall, the deputies who remained at the Palais Bourbon resolved to convene a session. Given that the assembly hall remained under insurgent occupation, the deputies convened in the spacious dining room of the Hôtel de Lassay, the residence of President Schneider. Schneider, profoundly affected by the violence he had endured during his evacuation from the palace, informed the assembly that he remained bedridden. Accordingly, the session was presided over by one of the vice-presidents of the Assembly, Alfred Le Roux, a deputy from Vendée. Louis-Antoine Garnier-Pagès, a Republican, exhorted the deputies to align themselves with the provisional government that was being constituted at the City Hall. This exhortation provoked vehement opposition. Meanwhile, the Assembly was apprised of Empress Eugénie's departure. After reading the Martel Commission's report, Adolphe Thiers' motion, which called for the election of a five-member national defense commission before the convening of a constituent assembly, was adopted by a substantial majority. Bonapartist deputy Ernest Dréolle then proposed the dispatch of a delegation to the City Hall to ascertain the sentiments of the republicans.

The delegation, headed by Jules Grévy and Louis-Antoine Garnier-Pagès, was received by Jules Favre. Meanwhile, several members of the recently appointed government had already proceeded to their respective ministries to ensure that they would be able to assume their duties once their portfolios had been assigned. Adolphe Crémieux had proceeded to the Ministry of Justice intending to draft the act that would dissolve the Legislative Body. However, Jules Favre refrained from informing the delegation members of this. The attempt at reconciliation was futile. Favre informed them that a government delegation would in turn proceed to the Palais Bourbon at 8 p.m. to present their response. Garnier-Pagès, a deputy from Paris, discovered on this occasion that he had also been appointed a minister and separated from the other deputies.

Meanwhile, several deputies had dispersed into the streets of Paris. As the crowd's elation increased with the spreading rumor of the Republic's proclamation, it became apparent that it was too late to exert any influence throughout events.

At the agreed-upon time, Jules Favre and Jules Simon convene with Adolphe Thiers at the Hôtel de Lassay. As a deputy from Paris, he is also entitled to a position in the government, which he declines. He is designated to preside over the session, during which Favre, after acknowledging the efforts of the Assembly, declares that the formation of the government is a fait accompli, undertaken in the interest of protecting the country. He then requests the ratification of this new government, while emphasizing that a refusal would not affect the situation. Thiers concurred, asserting that it is the obligation of all deputies "to ardently wish" for the success of the new government. Despite objections from some deputies, Thiers concludes the debates by stating, "I protest against the violence we have suffered today. However, in light of the imminent threat posed by the enemy, I believe our sole remaining option is to withdraw with dignity." The session is adjourned at 10 p.m., marking the dissolution of the Legislative Body.

By mid-afternoon, the Senate had effectively ceased to exist, as Pierre Cornut-Gentille observed. To ensure that the senators remained apprised of the developments that were to occur, the president, Eugène Rouher, convened them. Upon learning of the invasion of the Palais Bourbon, the senators were concerned that they might face a similar situation. However, President Rouher urged them to confront the reality of the situation. "No force threatens us." For Pierre Cornut-Gentille, "something was humiliating, almost dishonorable about it. It was as if the Senate had never existed. Everyone was aware of the futility of this pointless debate." Upon the suggestion of Senator Pierre Jules Baroche, the session was adjourned at 3:30 p.m.

=== Night of September 4–5: Formation of the new government ===
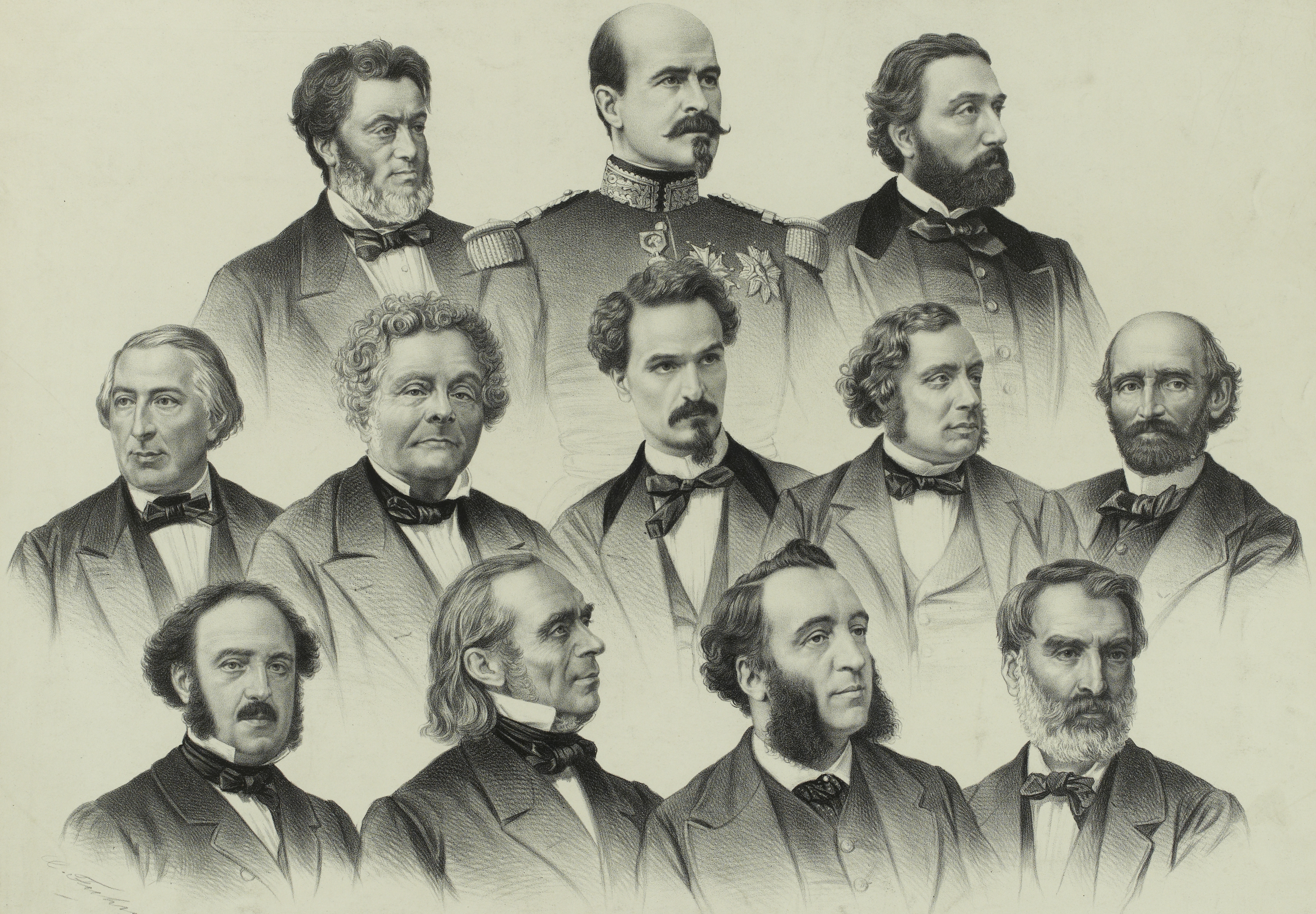
Members of the Government of National Defense, from top to bottom and left to right: Favre, Trochu, Gambetta, Arago, Crémieux, Rochefort, Picard, Glais-Bizoin, Simon, Garnier-Pagès, Ferry and Pelletan.

The inaugural meeting of the new government is scheduled at 10:30 p.m. in the former office of the prefect of the Seine at City Hall. The meeting, which will be presided over by General Trochu, will focus on the distribution of ministries. Ernest Picard asserts his claim to the Ministry of the Interior, a position for which Léon Gambetta had previously self-proclaimed himself earlier in the evening by signing several decrees. Picard exploits this discrepancy to demand a secret ballot, which ultimately substantiates Gambetta's appointment by a narrow margin of one vote. Picard then contemplates relinquishing his position, but under mounting pressure from his colleagues, he ultimately accepts the Ministry of Finance.

The remaining appointments are unobjectionable. Jules Favre is appointed to the Ministry of Foreign Affairs, where he will serve as Vice President of the Council. Adolphe Crémieux is assigned to the Ministry of Justice, while Jules Simon will oversee the Ministry of Public Instruction. Jules Ferry is appointed government secretary, though he is not assigned a ministerial portfolio, as he is tasked with responsibilities previously held by the prefect of the Seine. General Trochu, who was already serving as both the president of the Council and the military governor of Paris, selected General Le Flô, who was not a Republican but had opposed the December 2, 1851 coup d'état, which resulted in his imprisonment and exile, to serve in the Ministry of War. In the absence of the requisite expertise to head the other ministries, Emmanuel Arago, Louis-Antoine Garnier-Pagès, Alexandre Glais-Bizoin, Eugène Pelletan, and Henri Rochefort are appointed ministers without portfolio but are permitted to participate in deliberations, thus enabling the new government to include individuals who are not deputies of Paris. Vice-Admiral Martin Fourichon is appointed to the Ministry of the Navy and Colonies, Joseph Magnin to the Ministry of Commerce and Agriculture, and Pierre-Frédéric Dorian to the Ministry of Public Works, which also oversees industry and armament.

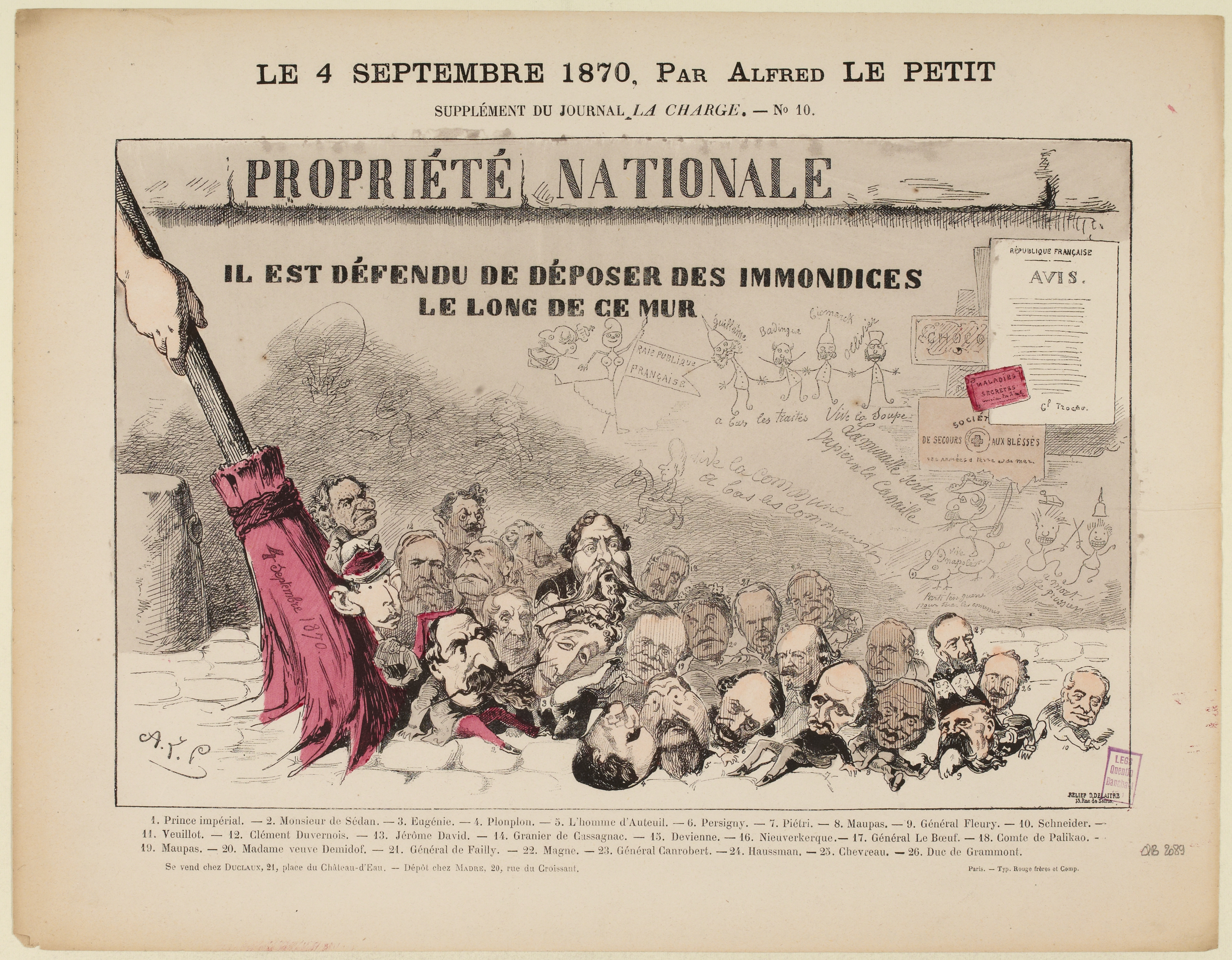
Caricature of the event by Alfred Le Petit in the weekly La Charge.

Consequently, the government, which bears the title of National Defense, encompasses all political factions from the center and left, except for the liberal Bonapartists. The Council of Ministers comprises individuals from a diverse range of political backgrounds, including those aligned with the far left (Rochefort), Orleanism (Trochu and Le Flô), moderate Republicans (Picard and Simon), and staunch Republicans (Gambetta, Ferry, and Crémieux). Jules Favre serves as a mediator between these two factions.

The remaining portion of the session is dedicated to adopting proclamations, which are to be published, distributed, and posted the following day. These proclamations are directed to both the citizens of Paris and the National Guard, as well as the government of the army. The decree dissolving the Legislative Body, prepared by Adolphe Crémieux, is adopted, as are two additional decrees: one providing amnesty for those convicted of political crimes and offenses, and another guaranteeing the freedom of the arms trade. Subsequently, several appointments are made, including Clément Laurier as director-general of personnel and the office of the Ministry of the Interior, and André Lavertujon as director of the Journal officiel. Before the Council's adjournment at 2 a.m., the recently appointed prefect of police, Émile de Kératry, reports to the ministers that no disturbances have occurred in the capital.

=== September 4 in the provinces ===
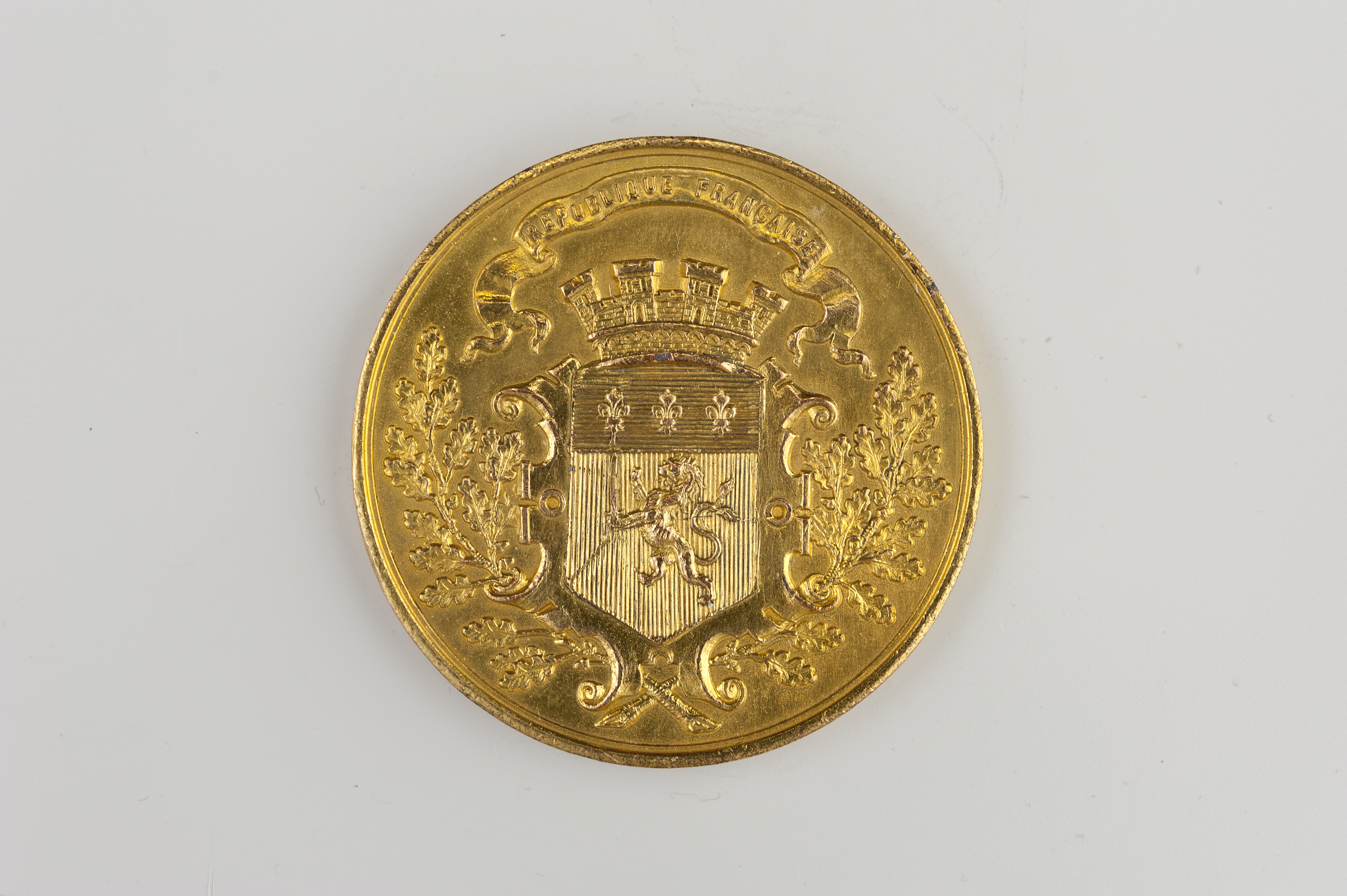
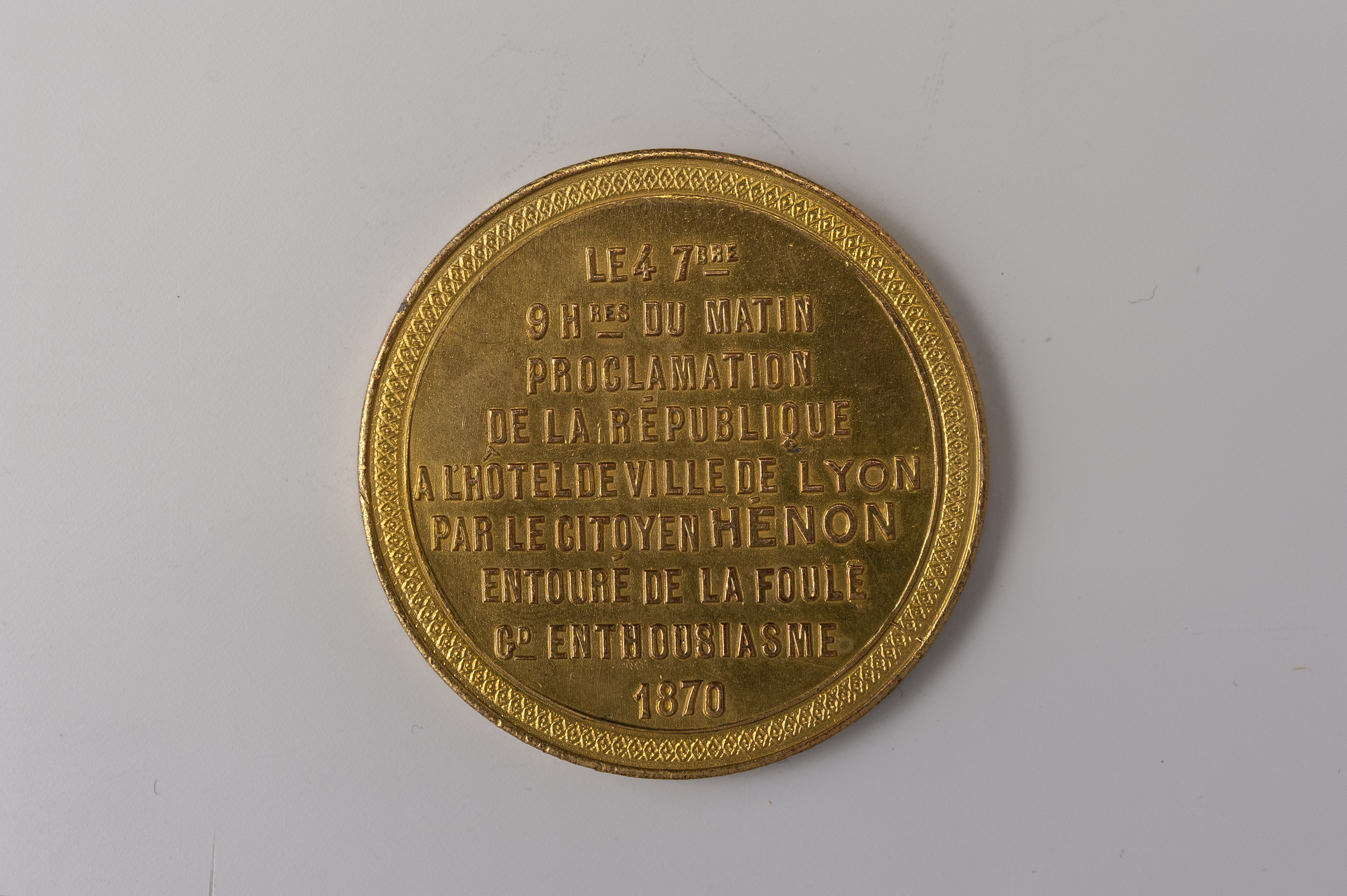
Medal commemorating the proclamation of the Republic at Lyon's city hall on the morning of September 4, 1870.

Diameter: 4.6 cm, weight: 42.16 g.

Musée Carnavalet, Paris.

An extraordinary occurrence in the annals of the French Revolution, several municipalities situated in the heart of the country, as well as those located in the southern regions, witnessed the initial stages of the revolutionary upheaval before Paris. In Lyon, a working-class city, the crowd invaded the Rhône prefecture as early as 7 a.m. on September 4. Two hours later, a public safety committee of nearly 80 members proclaimed the Republic before raising the red flag in City Hall. Those imprisoned for political reasons in Saint Paul were released, while magistrates, police officers, and the imperial prefect were imprisoned. A general amnesty was declared, and those imprisoned on common charges were also released on the condition that they serve in the military against Prussia.

A public safety committee was also convened at the Marseille prefecture in the afternoon of September 4. Meanwhile, in Bordeaux, a city with a long history of Republicanism, the population demonstrated peacefully, and the prefect stepped down voluntarily. In Toulouse, a municipal commission was established by the Republicans.

By the conclusion of September, civil unrest had commenced in the Antilles as a consequence of the proclamation of the Republic.

== The Aftermath of September 4 and the difficult establishment of the Republic ==
=== Siege of Paris and government delegation to Tours (1870–1871) ===
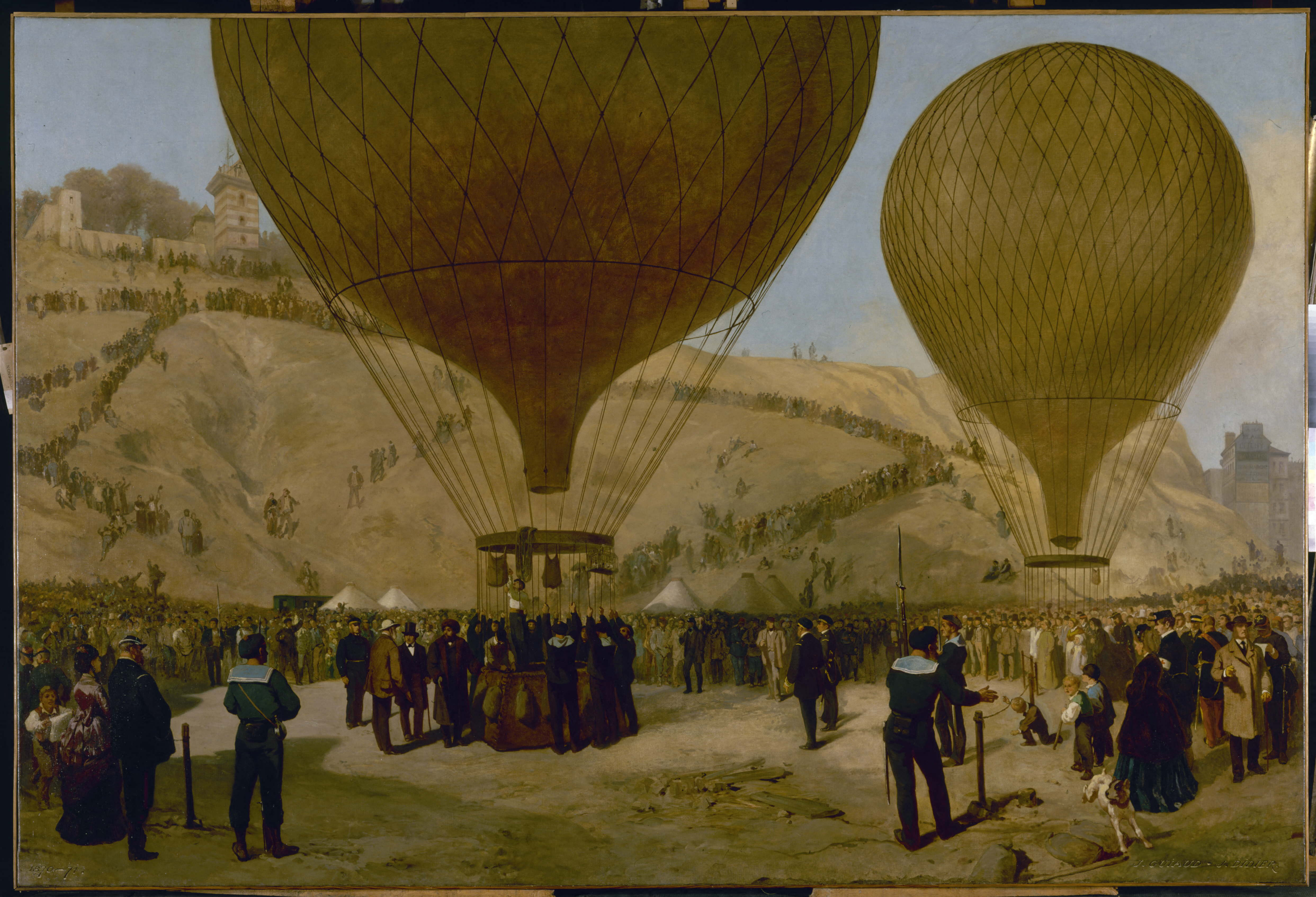
Léon Gambetta leaves the capital in a balloon during the siege of Paris (painting by Jacques Guiaud and Jules Didier, 1871, Musée Carnavalet).

From its first days, the Government of National Defense is primarily focused on mobilizing all men of fighting age, as the French troops, decimated by the defeat at Sedan and the encirclement of the Rhine army in Metz, must contain the rapid advance of the Prussian troops threatening Paris by mid-September. The new government thus finds itself in an inextricable situation: leading a country at war, partially invaded, and deprived of most of its armed forces, it is acclaimed by Parisians but rejected by much of the provinces. It cannot claim the legitimacy of universal suffrage, thus contradicting the principles it proclaims.

The government's initial plan was to hold elections for a Constituent Assembly on October 2 or 16. However, this plan had to be abandoned due to the occupation of numerous government departments by the Prussian army, as well as the mobilization of significant numbers of French troops. These circumstances made it impossible to hold the election. Additionally, the railway network connecting Paris with the provinces was severed on September 18. To circumvent the potential complications of a government under siege in the capital, a delegation of ministers is dispatched to Tours. This is soon followed by the arrival of Léon Gambetta, who successfully departs the capital by balloon on October 7 and reaches Tours two days later. Gambetta, who concurrently holds the Ministries of the Interior and War, vigorously mobilizes, trains, and equips new troops while concurrently addressing the suppression of federalist aspirations in select republican cities in southern France, including Lyon.

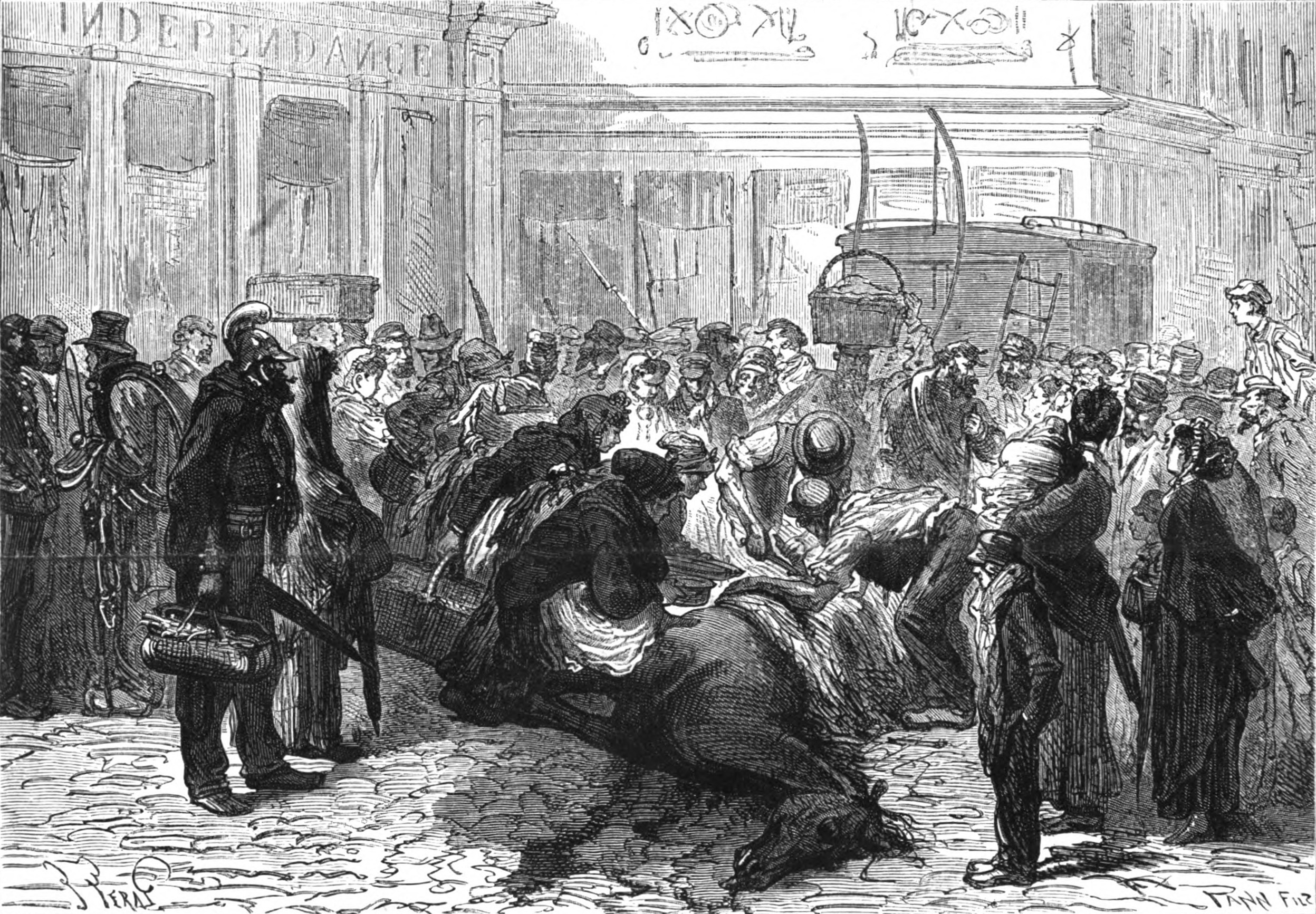
Parisians suffered from famine during the siege of the city, as illustrated by this engraving showing a horse being butchered in the street.

Concurrently, France's military circumstances are becoming increasingly unfavorable, resulting in the country's marginalization and isolation. Adolphe Thiers' European tour, undertaken to secure military support in London, Vienna, Florence, and St. Petersburg, proved unsuccessful. The population of Paris, facing unemployment, rising prices for essential goods, and later cold and famine in the heart of winter, demonstrates remarkable resilience but eventually succumbs to exhaustion, particularly as the Prussian army commenced bombardment of the capital on January 5, 1871. Jules Favre initiated armistice negotiations, resulting in the signing of the convention on January 26, which revealed internal governmental tensions, as Gambetta opposed it and resigned on February 6.

=== Republican defeat in the Legislative elections and the Paris Commune (1871) ===
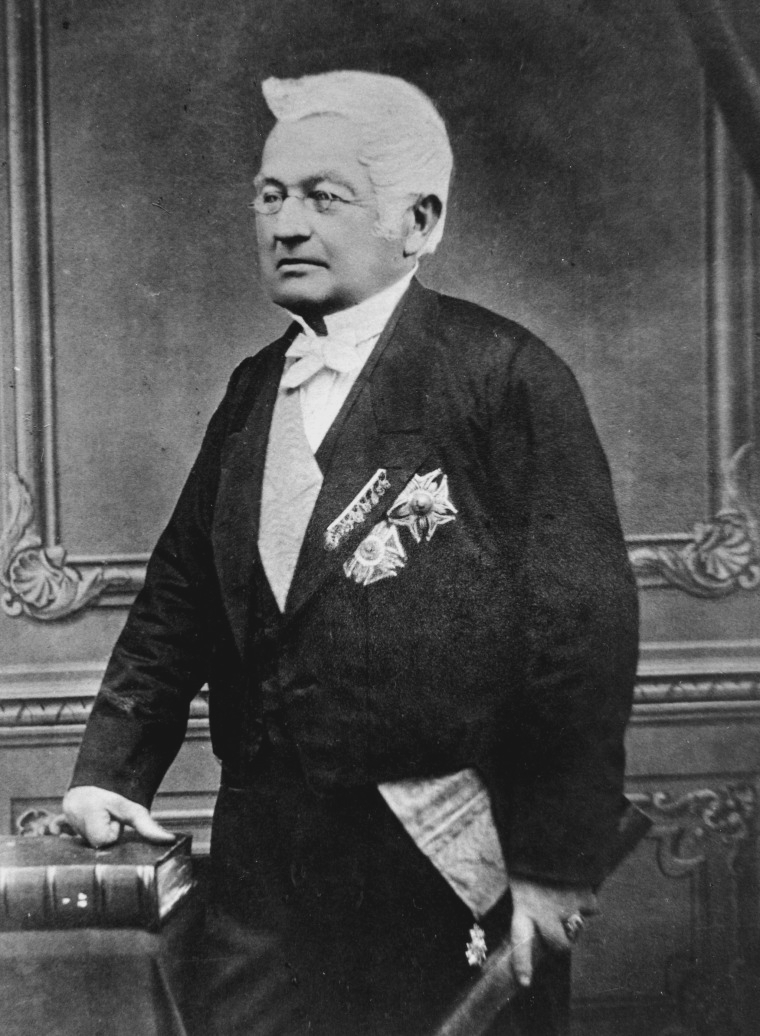
Official portrait of Adolphe Thiers in 1871.

The legislative elections are scheduled on February 8, with the newly elected assembly convening in Bordeaux four days later to select the executive branch responsible for negotiating the peace treaty. The elected Assembly is predominantly monarchist, with the Legitimists and Orleanists holding nearly 400 seats, compared to only 200 Republicans and about 20 Bonapartists. Despite this, the Republic is ratified. Adolphe Thiers is appointed head of the French Republic's executive, and Jules Grévy, a Republican deputy who had refused to join the proclamation of the Republic on September 4, assumes the presidency of the Assembly.

The proclamation of the armistice and the success of the monarchists in the elections resulted in the formation of numerous insurrectionary communes throughout France. In Paris, the situation rapidly deteriorated into a civil war between supporters of the Versailles government and the Communards, who refused to acknowledge its authority. Meanwhile, the individuals involved in the events of September 4 are subjected to scrutiny by the recently elected Assembly as part of a parliamentary investigation into the actions of the Government of National Defense. From the perspective of the monarchist majority, whose objective is to discredit the Republic, the aim is to ascertain whether members of this government were complicit in a plot against the Legislative Body and thus became accomplices of the future Communards.

=== Break between Paris and the provinces ===
The Republic is not universally accepted throughout France. On occasion, insurgents who seek to implement a genuine social revolution and are inclined to rival the Parisian government have rejected it. In Lyon, for instance, those of a moderate Republican persuasion constitute a minority. Consequently, Léon Gambetta opts to appoint his friend Paul Challemel-Lacour, a professor of philosophy, as prefect, reasoning that his moral authority will suffice to maintain order. However, Challemel-Lacour encounters considerable opposition from the majority of the recently established local authorities, who challenge his legitimacy. Similarly, in Marseille, the prefect Alphonse Esquiros, also appointed by Gambetta, ultimately allies with the League of the South, which aims to prolong the war while liberating itself from the National Defense. Esquiros was dismissed at the end of October and replaced by Alphonse Gent. In other Republican departments, conflicts arise between local authorities and the government. Gambetta attempts to prioritize administrative cohesion over ideology, provided that it remains in alignment with Republican principles. In some instances, due to the dearth of competent and reliable Republican officials, the Minister of the Interior opts to retain imperial prefects and sub-prefects or appoint Orleanists.

Other regions exhibit a hostile attitude toward the Republic. This is particularly evident in the departments of western and northwestern France, where Republicans, a minority group, are met with mistrust and concern. Anti-Republican demonstrations are occurring in several locations in northern France, including Boulogne-sur-Mer, Roubaix, and Armentières, as well as in Normandy, the Charente, the Puy-de-Dôme, and Limousin. Additionally, resistance has been observed in Corsica. In Mâcon, military personnel deployed bayonets to disperse a crowd attempting to seize the prefecture, resulting in one death and multiple injuries. In Cahors, the imperial prefect, with the support of a portion of the population, resisted for two days against local Republicans attempting to remove him. However, instances of violence are uncommon, potentially due to the necessity of safeguarding the nation against Prussian invasion. In the most traditional rural communities, with strong ties to Catholicism, resistance to the new regime can manifest as a refusal to cease agricultural work to join the conflict or a refusal to contribute taxes for military expenditures.

The 1871 legislative elections resulted in a majority for monarchist and conservative deputies, signifying the triumph of the provinces over Paris. This is due to the fact that the capital elected left-wing Republicans.

=== Failure of the Monarchist Restoration and consolidation of the Republic ===
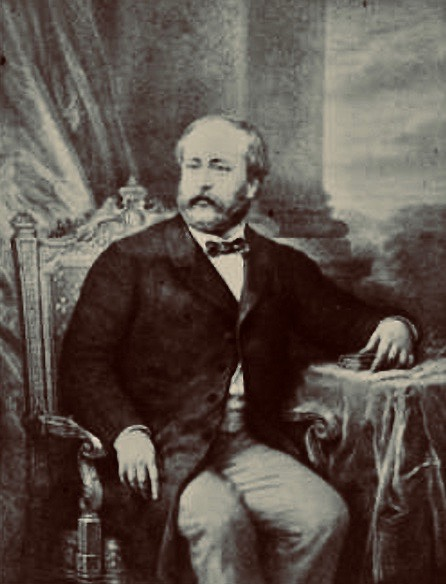
The Comte de Chambord, Legitimist pretender to the French throne.

The paradox of a strong monarchist majority in the Assembly does not result in a regime change. Instead, it is the result of divisions between Legitimists and Orleanists, which were further exacerbated by a manifesto published on July 5, 1871, in L'Union by one of the pretenders to the throne, the Count of Chambord. These divisions jeopardize the Third Restoration project. Adolphe Thiers appears to espouse a form of conservative republicanism and can rely on the support of moderate Republicans and Orleanists, thereby forming a center-left coalition in the Assembly. Many of them, such as Deputy Léon Say, hold the view that "a monarchist restoration [...] would only serve to precipitate further revolutions in France." On August 31, 1871, Thiers's authority was further reinforced by the vote on the Rivet Act, which formally conferred upon him the title of President of the Republic and extended his tenure until the establishment of the country's definitive institutions.

Following the resignation of Thiers in 1873 and the subsequent election of Patrice de MacMahon, there was a resurgence of interest in the prospect of a monarchist restoration. The government engages in a vigorous campaign against the Republicans, who nevertheless gain ground in each by-election. In consequence, numerous prefects and magistrates were dismissed, mayors and teachers were placed under surveillance, and the press was subjected to rigorous censorship, resulting in the prohibition of over 200 newspapers between 1873 and 1875. The Count of Chambord's indecision ultimately failed the alliance between the right and the restoration. The vote on the constitutional laws of 1875 reinforced the Republic, while the Republican majority grew. Following the crisis of May 16, 1877, the legislative elections substantiated the triumph of the Republican left and parliamentary sovereignty.

== Contemporary views ==
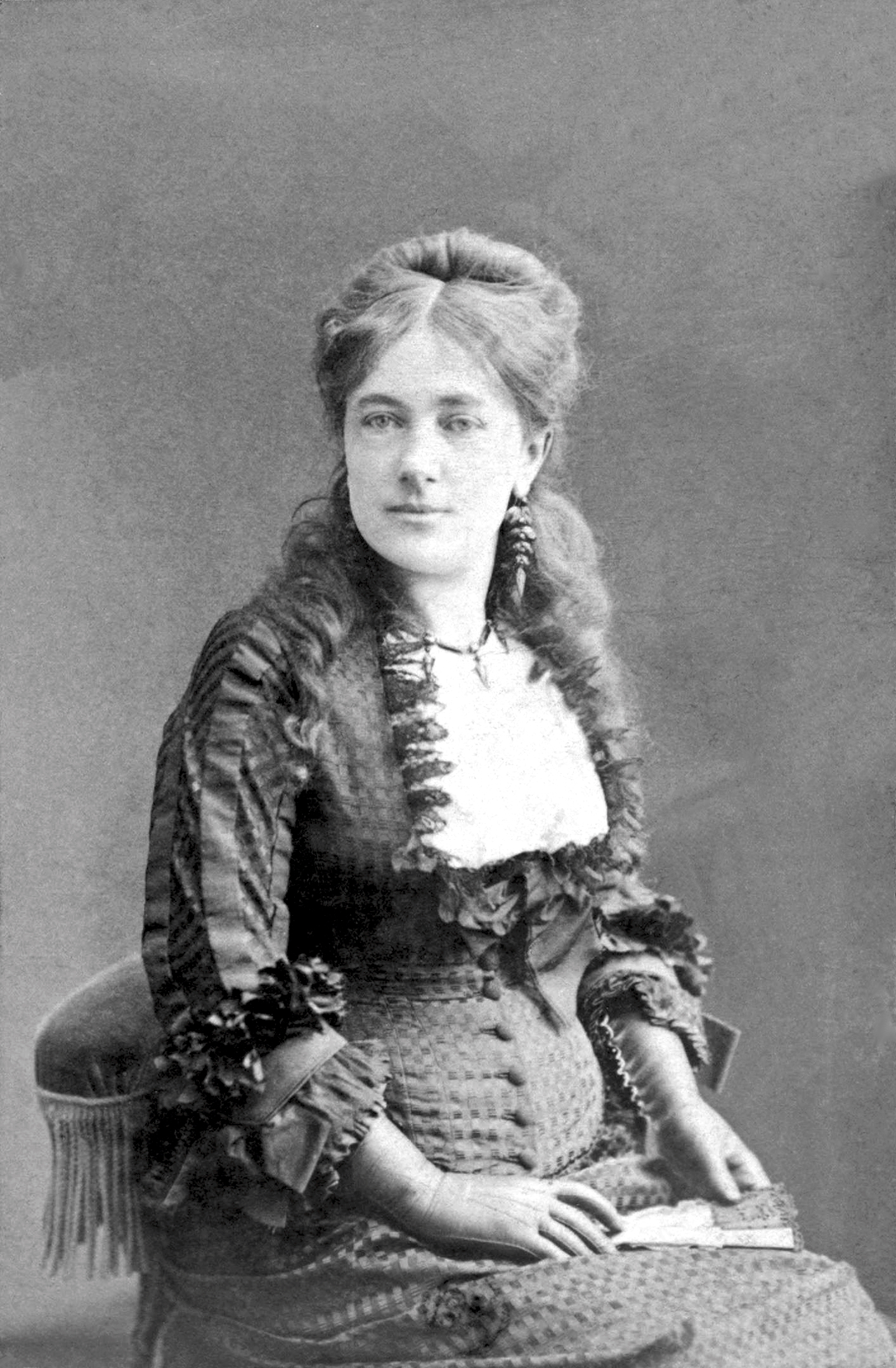
Witness to the event, writer Juliette Adam recounts her memories.

As Éléonore Reverzy, professor of 19th-century literature, has observed, the image of a day of celebration is the predominant account from contemporaries of September 4, 1870. This account depicts the day as a "joyful revolution without barricades or bloodshed." In the aftermath of the humiliating defeat of the emperor at Sedan, most people welcomed the fall of the empire, whose emblems were torn down and destroyed in public buildings.

As documented by the writer Juliette Adam, the emperor becomes the focal point of popular discontent during the initial spontaneous demonstrations:

Above all heads rises the specter of December 2. The bloody dead of that fateful day are seen mingled with the hecatomb of Sedan. Hatred, violence, overflow from all hearts; threats, insults, and recriminations pile upon Bonaparte. Traitor! Coward! These two words, repeated by thousands of voices, form a sort of dull, ill-timed, irritating, stormy accompaniment to the sharp, vibrant words springing from all sides.

— Juliette Adam, Mes illusions et nos souffrances, September 3, 1870.

A young quartermaster in a battalion of the National Guard, Émile Maury, also bears witness to the iconoclastic acts against imperial symbols:

On the morning of September 4, we learned that the Emperor was a prisoner. I went with my father to see this grand spectacle of an entire people acclaiming the Republic in front of the Legislative Corps palace. Though not naturally demonstrative, I joined in with my cheers and handshakes to the city guards, who were completely taken aback by this great movement. All signs recalling the Empire—the eagles, the coats of arms—were torn down and thrown into the water.

— Émile Maury, Mes souvenirs sur les événements des années 1870-18710

The fervor of this revolutionary day causes the people to overlook the miseries of war and the threat posed by the Prussian invasion, as journalist and dramatic critic Francisque Sarcey states frankly in Le Siège de Paris, 1871. "One had dismissed concerns and apprehensions. Significant matters would be addressed the following day." Writer Jules Barbey d'Aurevilly, who was also present during these events, provides a comprehensive account of what transpired the next day. He underscores the pervasive sense of elation among the demonstrators while acknowledging the measured response exhibited by some Republican officials:

I didn't leave the boulevard until half past one in the morning. What a spectacle! What lightness of the French mind! One should have wept with rage thinking of our poor soldiers being slaughtered, whose corpses were at that moment floating down the rivers. Yet, no one was crying, no one was angry, they were in a delirium of joy! All one heard were cries of 'Long live the Republic!' No one even said 'Long live France!' anymore. I saw Republicans (whom I know and who have more sense than others) affected and almost ashamed of this indecent joy amid public misfortune, forgotten by the mere fall of the Empire and the proclamation of the Republic. And it was in witnessing this that the thought came to me: we are lost.

— Jules Barbey d'Aurevilly, Letter to Madame de Bouglon, September 5, 1870

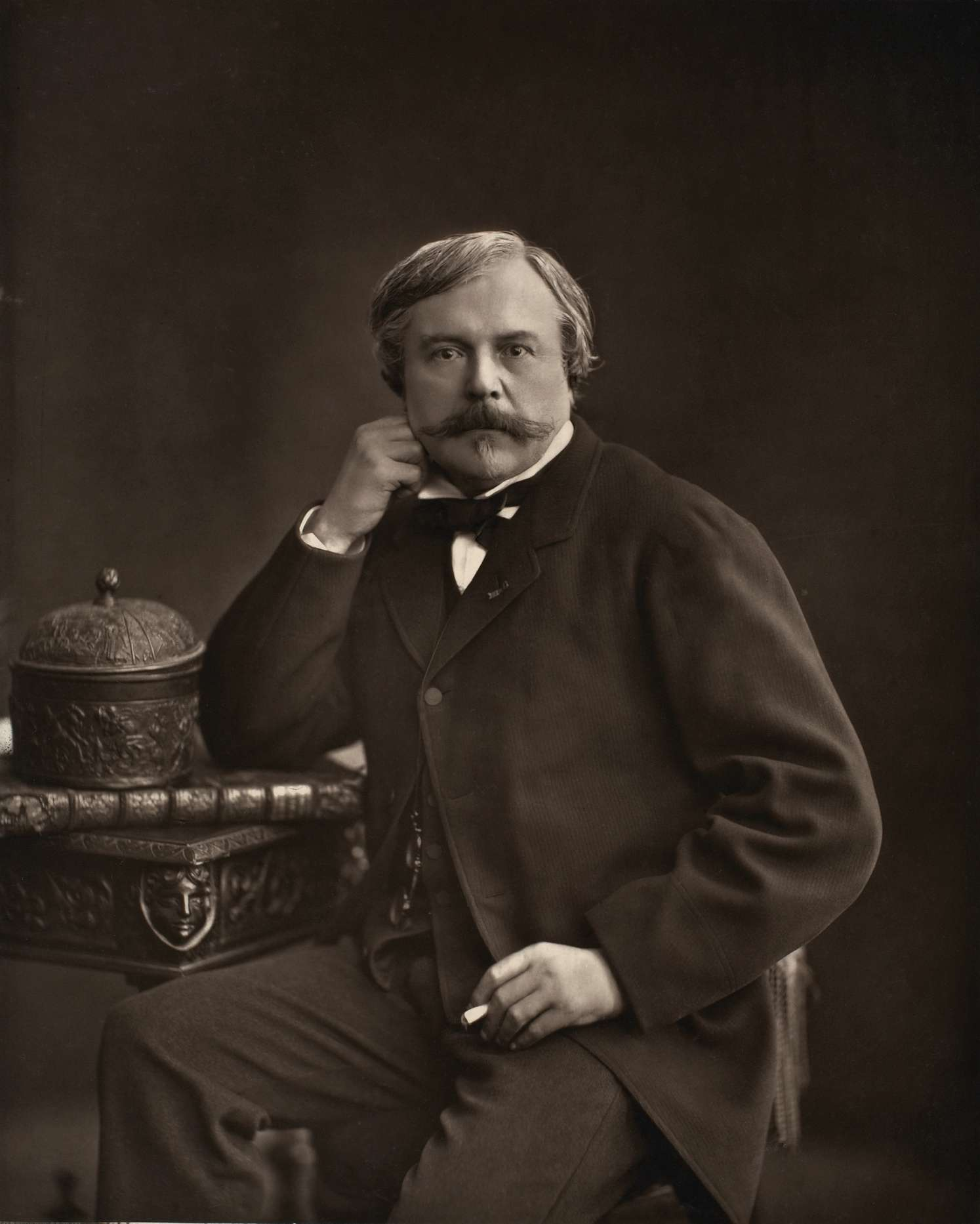
Writer Edmond de Goncourt takes a critical look at revolutionary events.

Similarly, another writer, Edmond de Goncourt, made an identical observation regarding the diminishing threat of the Prussians. His subsequent testimony, recorded in his journal on the same day, indicates that he did not share the prevailing enthusiasm of the crowd:

Sidewalks, streets, everything is covered, filled with men and women who seem to have poured out from their homes onto the pavement, like a city-wide celebration day; a million people who have forgotten that the Prussians are just three or four days' march from Paris and, in the warm, intoxicating day, roam aimlessly, driven by the feverish curiosity of the great historical drama unfolding.

— Edmond de Goncourt, Le Journal des Goncourt, September 4, 1870

The popular fervor persisted on September 5 with the return of Victor Hugo from exile, a principal adversary of the imperial regime. At Gare du Nord, he was "welcomed like the Messiah by a frenzied crowd", according to historian Alain Gouttman. Engineer Maxime Vuillaume, present in the crowd, retained an emotional memory of the event, which he recounted a few years later in his testimony, Mes cahiers rouges.

== Historiography and memory ==
=== Historiography ===
From the 1880s until the First World War, republican historiography maintained a critical stance toward the events of September 4. As many contemporaries were still alive, the accounts constituted a "present history", one whose outcome still engaged the present. The treatment of the event was largely polemical. As Olivier Le Trocquer observed, the central question was whether the protagonists had erred, whether they were culpable or not in terms of public morality, or whether, conversely, gratitude should be extended to them for overthrowing the Empire and seizing power. For instance, in the initial volume of his Histoire contemporaine (1897), historian Samuel Denis was notably condemnatory, asserting that the men of September 4 were guilty of a manifest usurpation not sufficiently justified by the precarious circumstances. They assumed power in a revolutionary manner, with the assistance of foreign invaders in the Legislative Body and without the consent of the country's duly elected representatives. They then used this usurped power in a way that was detrimental to the nation's interests. For these two reasons, they will not escape the harsh judgment of history.

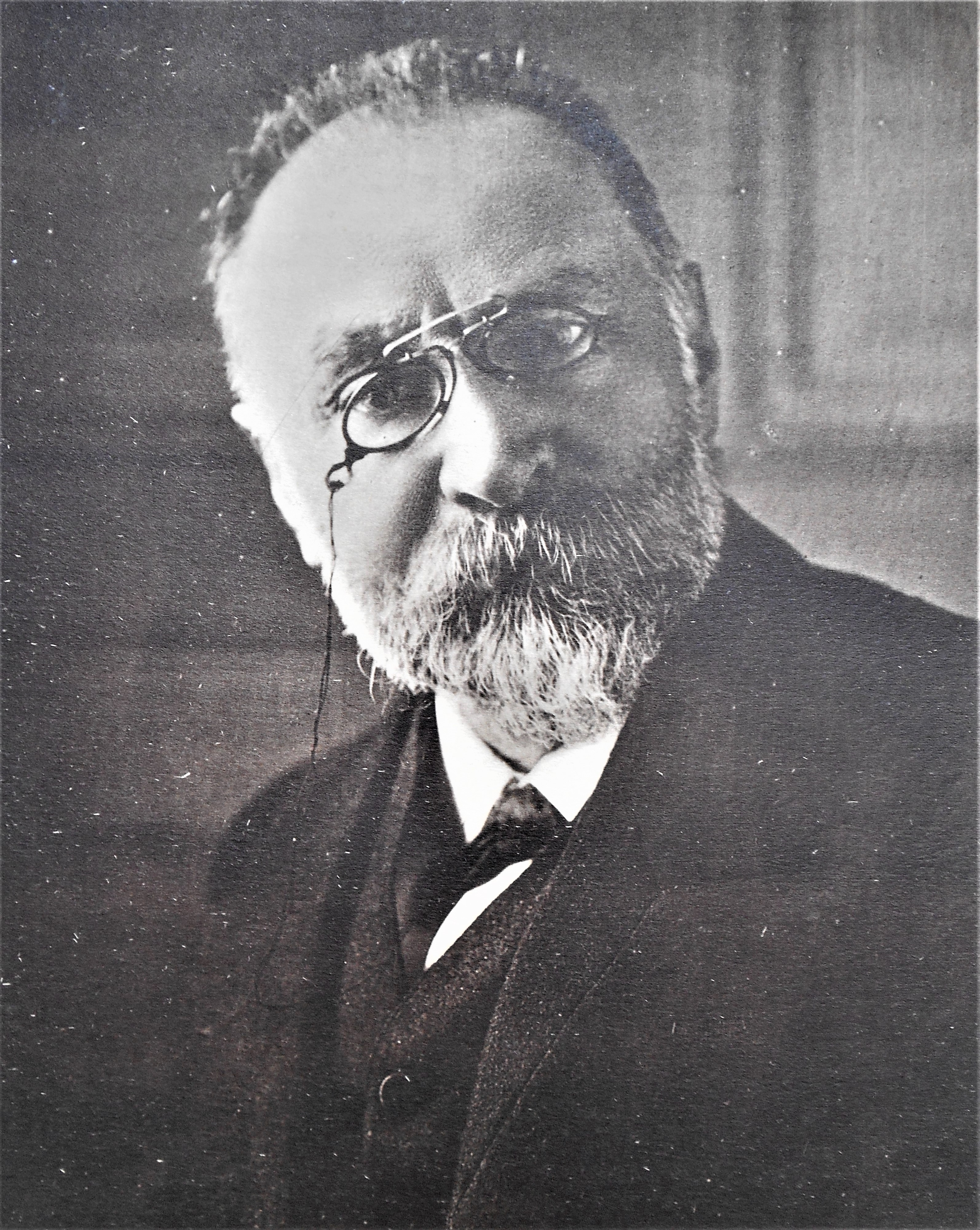
Charles Seignobos publishes the first distanced account of the event.

The initial account that distanced itself from the event was published in 1921 in the seventh volume of Histoire de la France contemporaine, intitulé Du déclin du Second Empire à l'établissement de la III^{e} République. This text was written by Charles Seignobos under the direction of Ernest Lavisse. The publication of the work coincided almost with the fiftieth anniversary of the Republic, which had been celebrated the previous year. It was more in line with commemorating the proclamation than the revolution that led to it. In the 1930s, popular works such as Raymond Recouly's Le Quatre Septembre and Léo Larguier's Le 4 Septembre were published. Simultaneously, the proclamation of the Republic was discussed in books dedicated to the history of the Third Republic. These were similarly partisan and engaged narratives, including the critical work by royalist historian Jacques Bainville and the laudatory account by Alexandre Zévaès. Despite their contrasting judgments, these two works shared the common feature of placing the events of September 4 at the forefront, in contrast to earlier works.

In the period following the Second World War, the event was seldom referenced. In 1952, Joseph Calmette identified this date as a significant event in the republic’s history, situating it within an "evolutionary vision of historical progress." However, he did not provide a detailed account or question its supposed significance. "September 4 represents one of the most significant historical dates in our history. It signaled the demise of the monarchical order and the end of personal power. Neither the monarchy nor the Empire would ever return in the alternation of our regimes. "A period had definitively ended. From then on, France would be governed in a republican form." The first significant article dedicated to the event was published by Rémy Gossez in 1952, on the occasion of the 77th Congress of learned societies held in Grenoble. The article's focus was on the preparations for the overthrow of the Empire, with a particular emphasis on the active role played by the National Guard and a rejection of accusations of conspiracy against the republican deputies.

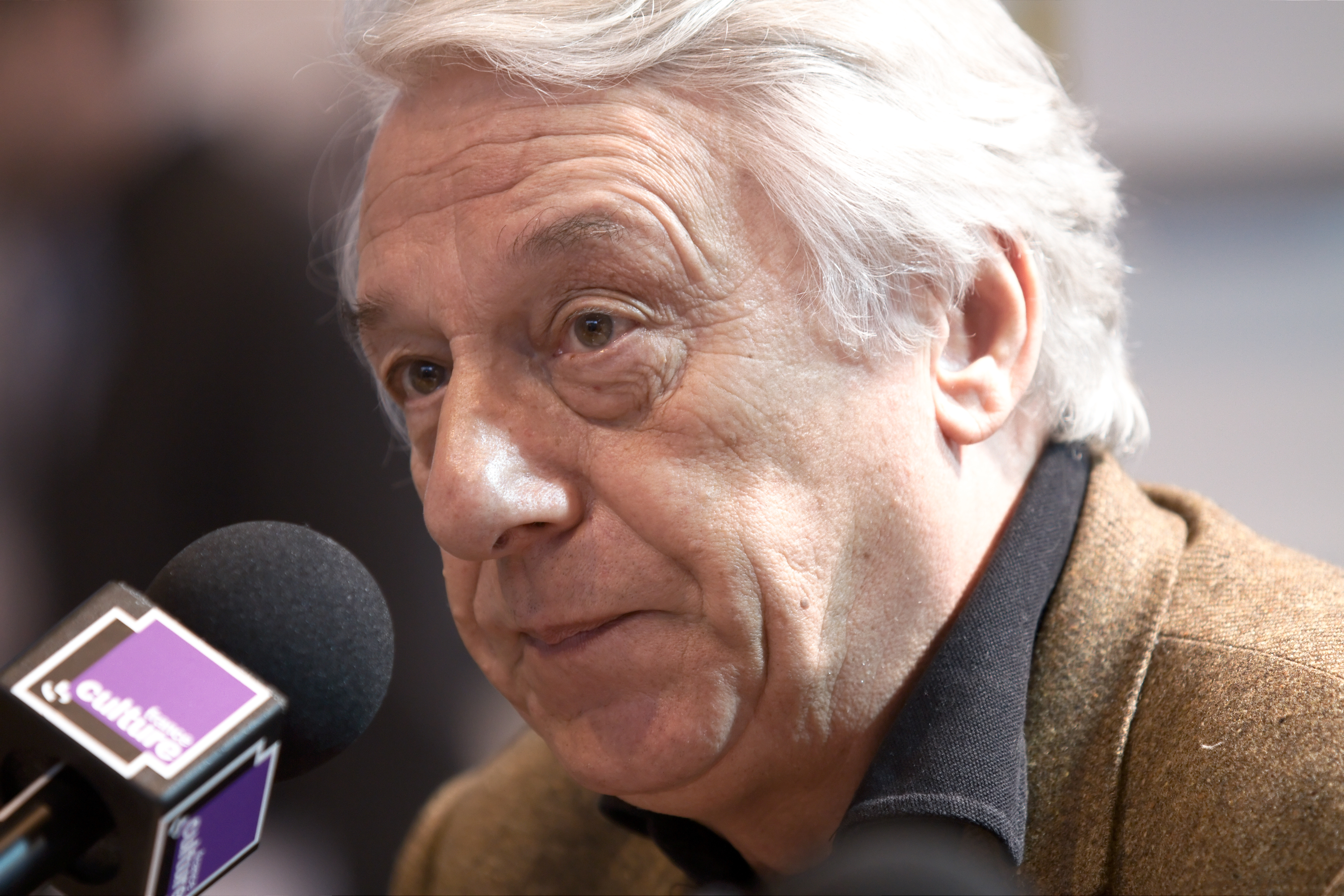
In the 1970s, Michel Winock took part in the extensive historiography of the Paris Commune, which gave a social interpretation of September 4, 1870.

In the 1970s, the centenary of the Commune was accompanied by a plethora of historiographical works that also dealt with the proclamation of the Republic from a social perspective. The majority of these works, which were sympathetic to the Commune, ascribed a negative value to the date of September 4 by attributing ulterior motives to the "republican bourgeoisie" that assumed power on that day. These motives were perceived to be a political calculation aimed at preventing social revolution. Historian Henri Guillemin denounced the "Republic of the Jules", while philosopher Henri Lefebvre portrayed the events of September 4 as a conflict between the moderate bourgeoisie and the working class. Jean-Pierre Azéma and Michel Winock also criticized the "iconic image" according to which that day, "the republic, like a phoenix rising from its ashes, imposed itself on France to save the homeland." In 1973, Alain Plessis, inspired by recent research on the Commune, identified it as the true breakpoint instead of 1870 and adopted the social aspect of the event while downplaying the revolutionary nature of September 4.

In the late 20th century, historians such as Maurice Agulhon, Stéphane Audoin-Rouzeau, and Éric Anceau observed that this foundational event had been largely forgotten. Anceau even identified the parties responsible for this. "The days of February 1848 and September 4, 1870 […] are pivotal in our contemporary history, as each corresponds to a revolution and marks the rebirth and subsequent establishment of the republic in our country. This regime has remained unchallenged since, except for the period between 1940 and 1944. Nevertheless, for the majority of French citizens, these events evoke at best vague recollections from their schooldays or a sense of curiosity. This is not unexpected. A cursory examination of the curricula of middle and high schools, as well as the content of university courses, reveals that these twenty-three years occupy a negligible portion of the educational landscape. The work of Jean-Yves Mollier and Jocelyne George, La plus longue des Républiques (1994), represents a notable exception, as it did not address the theme of oblivion. Instead, it offered an analysis of the event that included the events that took place in the provinces on that day. In 2017, lawyer and essayist Pierre Cornut-Gentille sought to address this lack of awareness and restore September 4 to its rightful place in French history by providing a comprehensive account of the day's events, detailing the sequence of events and their progression over time.

In his 2015 study of France's defeat in the Franco-Prussian War of 1870, historian Alain Gouttman offered a particularly critical assessment of the revolutionaries of September 4, characterizing the event as a "fraud." He directly accused General Trochu of having favored republican ambitions by deliberately abandoning the defense of the Corps législatif and the Tuileries Palace. Furthermore, he criticized the republicans around Léon Gambetta for acting out of opportunism and a thirst for power rather than in the country's best interest. "To sacrifice everything to ideology in such tragic circumstances, to overthrow a legitimate government in the presence of the enemy after the French armies had been brought to their knees, was a form of betrayal of the true interests of the nation, prioritizing the reasons for civil war over those of foreign war." Alain Gouttman described September 4 as a "disastrous day" from which "the country descended into chaos."

=== September 4, a Revolution? ===
The proclamation of the French Republic on September 4, 1870, represented the third French revolution of the nineteenth century. It followed the July Revolution of 1830, which placed King Louis-Philippe I on the throne at the head of a new regime, the July Monarchy, and the revolution of 1848, which led to the birth of the Second Republic. This fits more broadly within a context of political instability that can be traced back to the French Revolution of 1789.

Eugène Delacroix's La Liberté guidant le peuple celebrates the Trois Glorieuses.

The day of September 4 follows a similar pattern to that of other major revolutionary days experienced by the country, namely the spontaneous uprising of the people of Paris in the name of liberty, the pressure of the riot on the Assembly or its invasion by the crowd demanding the downfall of the monarch, the formation of a provisional government and the proclamation of the new regime at the Hôtel de Ville with the dual aim of calming the protesters and outmaneuvering the extremists.

However, in contrast to previous revolutionary movements, the events of September 4th were preceded by a military debacle and did not emerge from a socio-economic crisis. The revolution resulted in neither deaths nor injuries and led to the establishment of a stable republican regime that remained unchallenged, except for during the Vichy regime during World War II. For this reason, Pierre Cornut-Gentille considered the events of 1830 and 1848 to be "inefficient, violent, and ultimately unsuccessful attempts to enshrine the principles of the Great Revolution or to establish the republic permanently", revolutions "imperfect and incomplete, unlike the unblemished legacy of the men of September 4." For historian Éric Anceau, the day of September 4, though not spectacular, bloody, or glorious like its predecessors, laid the foundation for the future triumphs of the Third Republic.

The absence of victims and barricades led many historians to argue that the proclamation of September 4 could not be classified as a revolution. René Rémond and Stéphane Audoin-Rouzeau both argue that the proclamation of September 4 cannot be classified as a revolution. Rémond states that it "can hardly be called a revolutionary day", while Audoin-Rouzeau highlights the absence of violence and the limited vandalism observed that day, apart from the destruction of a few imperial symbols. Moreover, these iconoclastic acts are more prominent in contemporary accounts of the event, as evidenced by press articles and personal diaries, than in later historical narratives. This observation led Olivier Le Trocquer to suggest that "for contemporaries, these rites marked the revolutionary nature of the event, and their later erasure accompanied the euphemized reinterpretation of September 4."

=== Opportunism of the Republicans ===
In his essay, Pierre Cornut-Gentille notes that before 1870, revolutionaries demonstrated a notable degree of concern for the well-being of their counterparts. The coup d'état was carried out with a high degree of consideration. "Not only was there no gunfire, no barricades, and no bloodshed, but those who seized power expressed remorse, while those who were ousted appeared to protest only for appearances." For an extended period, the moderate Republicans in the Assembly pursued a strategy of reassuring the population to seize power through democratic means. This attachment to legalism was clearly articulated by one of the Republican leaders, Léon Gambetta, during the trial of the Baudin affair in 1868. Gambetta contrasted what he termed the "barricade of the Law" with the one born from street violence, stating, "If one examines what we write, they will not find a single line that is not within the Law."

For the Republican Party, a revolution would only serve to discredit the new regime and ultimately ensure its demise. However, the sequence of events that transpired on September 4th compelled them to assume control in a manner that was incongruent with their fundamental principles. Historians René Rémond and Jérôme Grévy posit that the Republic did not emerge from a conspiracy but rather from the power vacuum created by the defeat. As Pierre Cornut-Gentille notes, the Republicans endured the events while also seizing successive opportunities to save the essential: that the Republican Party and the Republic were not associated with a coup. Once the majority and even Thiers himself withdrew, and it became physically impossible to resist the crowd of demonstrators, proclaiming the Republic while avoiding civil war became a viable option.

When Jules Favre and Léon Gambetta led the procession towards the Hôtel de Ville to proclaim the Republic, they sought to preempt the far-left leaders who could have exploited the circumstances to overthrow the social order. These included Auguste Blanqui, Jean-Baptiste Millière, Charles Delescluze, and Gustave Flourens. The Republican deputies thus chose to assume a leading role in the revolutionary movement to contain it, despite not being its initiators.

In his analysis, historian Jacques Julliard posits that the reinforcement of parliamentary authority within a more liberal framework ultimately served the interests of the Republican regime. Julliard further suggests that the Second Empire represented a preparatory phase for the Republic, analogous to the Restoration's role in shaping the representative and parliamentary regime. In both instances, these regimes were on a trajectory towards consolidating power that would ultimately prove unsustainable. For many historians, the advent of the Republic can be primarily attributed to the collapse of the imperial regime, a collapse that was not a result of Republican influence but rather the consequence of the conflict with Prussia and the circumstances surrounding it.

Following the Emperor's defeat, the Republican Party emerged as the most viable institution for safeguarding the territorial integrity and national unity of the state. This enabled its leaders to "seize the Republic from its partisans, and even to expel its partisan spirit, to identify it with the nation itself", as the historian has observed.

=== An event erased from collective memory ===
Never celebrated, never commemorated, September 4, 1870, seems today erased from national memory.

— Pierre Cornut-Gentille

As early as 1930, historian Daniel Halévy employed the term "obscure times" to characterize the nascent period of the Third Republic. The individuals involved in the event did not seek to commemorate it, and historical texts typically reserve only a brief mention of it. In the comprehensive Histoire de France contemporaine in twelve volumes, directed by Ernest Lavisse, known as the "teacher of the Republic", whose works significantly influenced the development of the national narrative, the day of September 4 is mentioned in a brief paragraph of eighteen lines, with only five providing a summary of the key events and thirteen listing the members of the Government of National Defense. This cursory reference is situated within a section designated "The Army of the Loire" in a chapter dedicated to the Franco-Prussian War of 1870, as though it were a trivial occurrence.

This is also the case in more recent works, with accounts of the event rarely exceeding a few lines. For example, the ninth volume of Nouvelle Histoire de la France contemporaine by Alain Plessis, published in 1979, and La France du XIXe siècle by Francis Démier, published in 2000, are two such works. In his detailed account of this revolutionary day published in 2017, essayist Pierre Cornut-Gentille identifies two exceptions: the work La plus longue des Républiques by Jean-Yves Mollier and Jocelyne George, published in 1994, and L'année terrible by Pierre Milza, published in 2009.

The event is thus often displaced or even omitted, as in Gabriel Hanotaux's Histoire de la fondation de la Troisième République. The first volume, reissued in 1925, is titled Le gouvernement de M. Thiers, despite covering the period from 1870 to 1873. This anticipates Thiers' accession to power by omitting the revolutionary episode.

Similarly, the various Republican governments did not typically commemorate the event. In 1880, the founders of the Third Republic selected July 14 as the date for the national holiday. This date commemorates the storming of the Bastille and the Fête de la Fédération, which was held a year later to celebrate the unity of the nation around the king. This rationale was employed to persuade the monarchist deputies who were opposed to the bill. The date of September 4 was never even referenced during the parliamentary debates preceding this decision. While the leaders of the Third Republic did not celebrate the founding event, it was more frequently commemorated in the provinces, particularly in regions where the Republican vote was strongest and where numerous streets were named after it. In France, over 130 towns have a Rue du Quatre-Septembre.

In Paris, few locations serve to preserve the memory of the event. On that very day, demonstrators renamed Rue du Quatre-Septembre, replacing the previous name, Rue du Dix-Décembre, which had been used to commemorate the election of Prince Louis-Napoleon Bonaparte to the presidency of the Republic in 1848. Similarly, the proclamation of the Republic is among the twelve high-reliefs sculpted by Léopold Morice that adorn the pedestal of the Monument à la République, located in Place de la République.

Places of memory for September 4, 1870

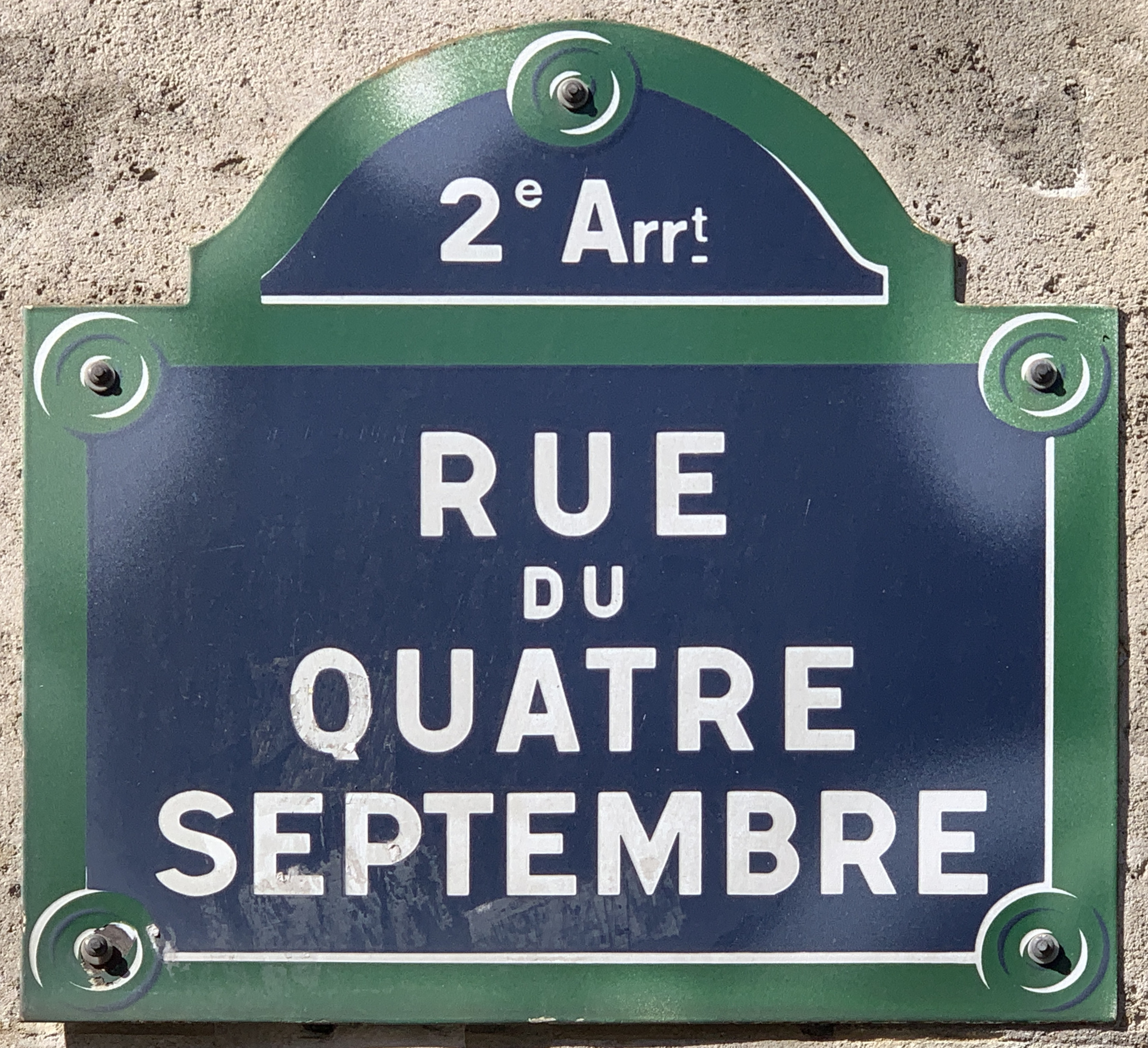
Parisian street commemorating the proclamation of the Republic.

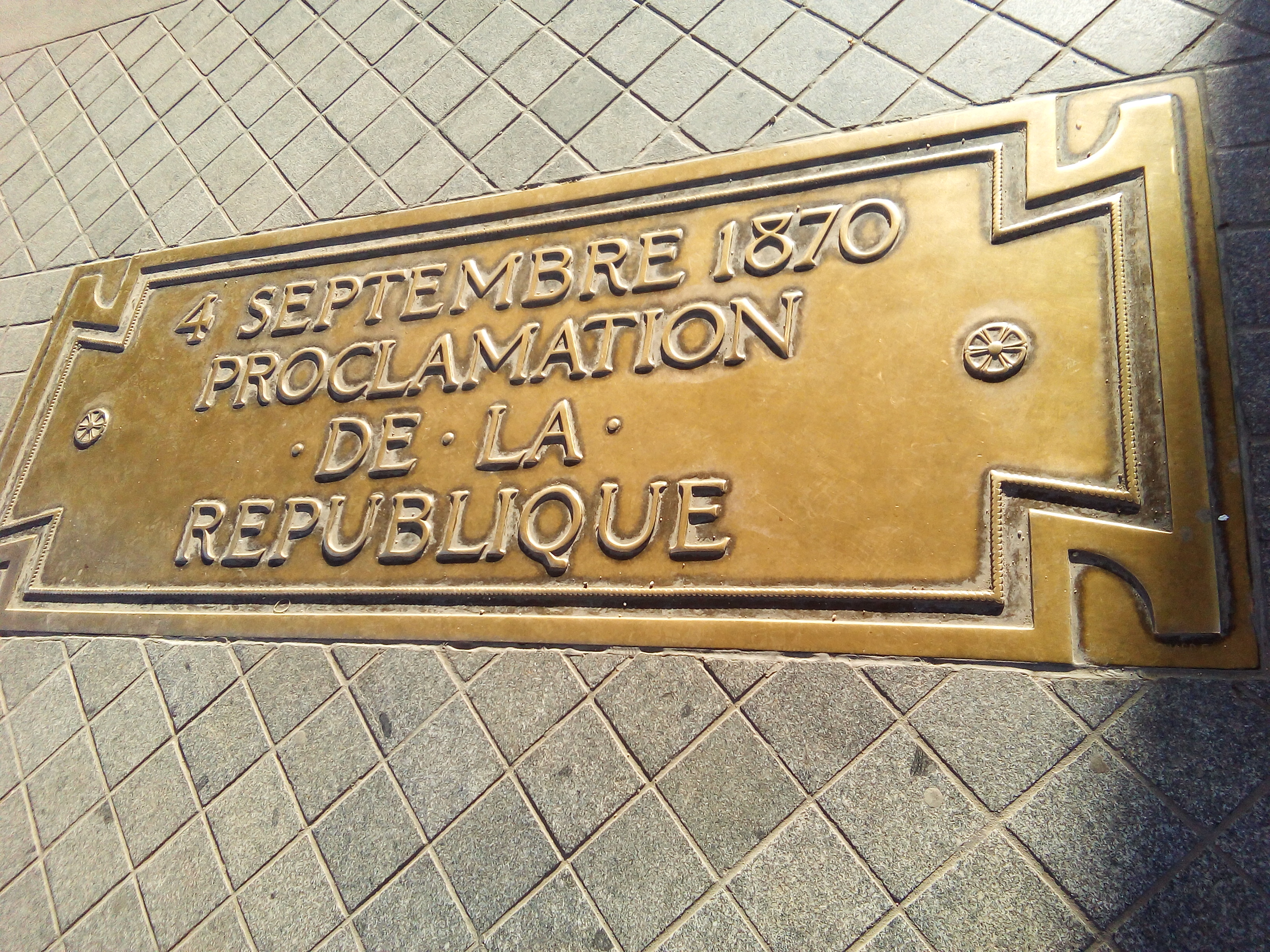
Commemorative plaque near the tomb of the Unknown Soldier, at the foot of the Arc de Triomphe de l'Étoile.

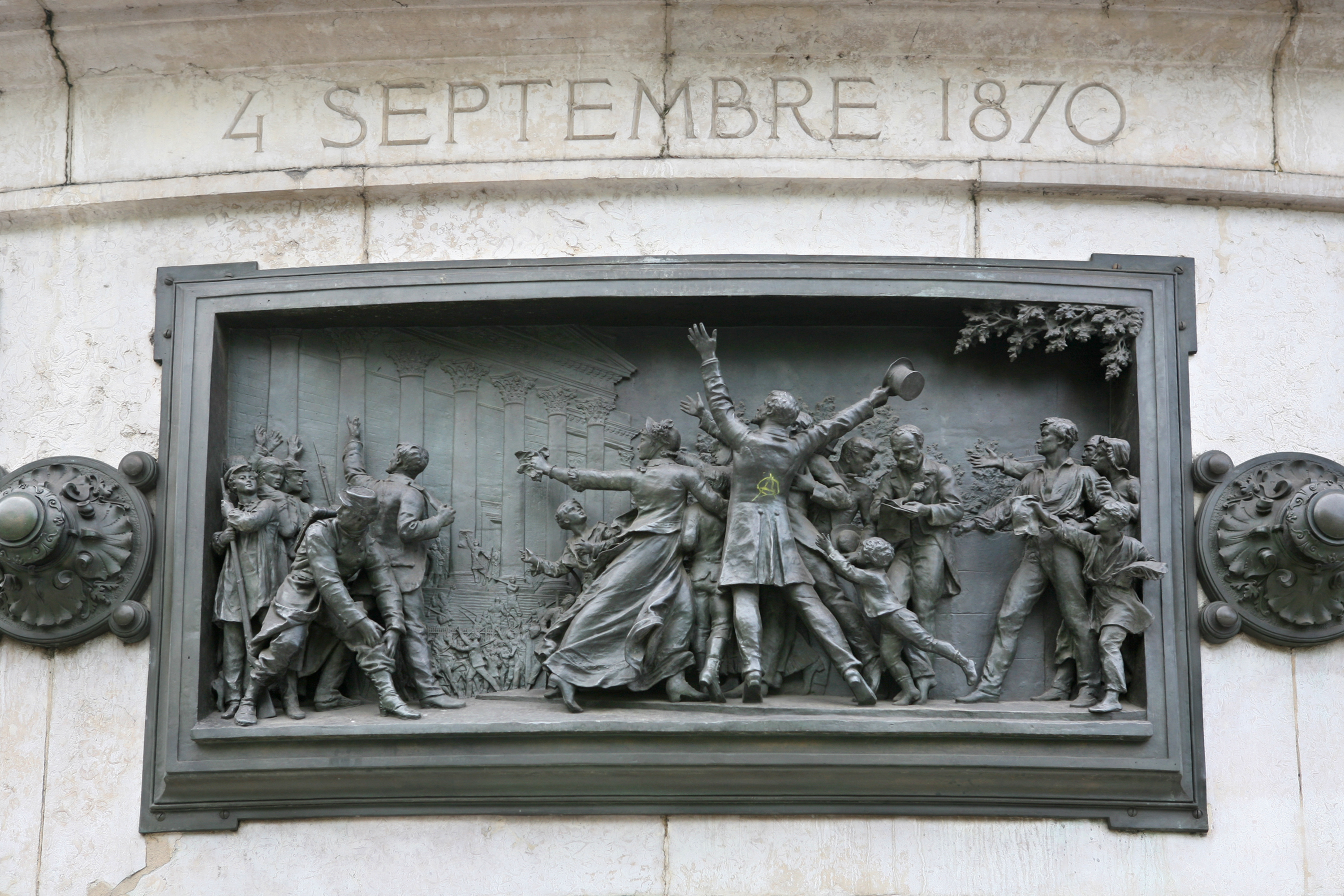
Bronze high relief on the pedestal of the Monument à la République

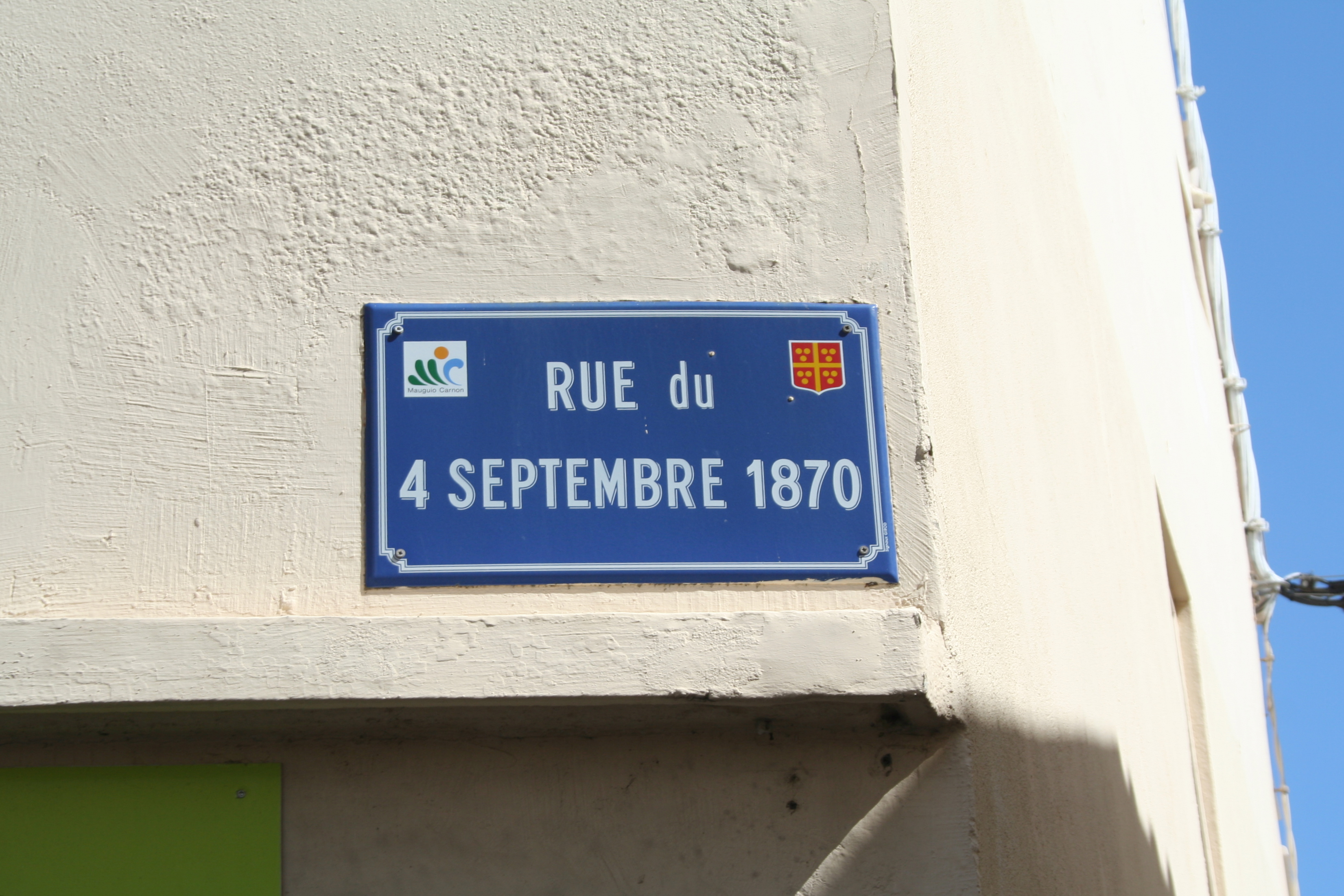
Street plaque in Mauguio, Hérault.

In 1920, the fiftieth anniversary of the proclamation of the Republic was commemorated on November 11, the date of the 1918 armistice, rather than on September 4 as had been previously observed. This date coincided with the burial of the unknown soldier under the Arc de Triomphe and the deposition of Léon Gambetta's heart in the Panthéon. In 1970, the centenary of the Third Republic was commemorated with a colloquium on the Republican spirit, organized by the University of Orléans, and an exhibition at the Hôtel de Ville in Paris, inaugurated by President Georges Pompidou. The only notable exception was September 4, which was the date chosen by Charles de Gaulle in 1958 to deliver a speech presenting the draft constitution of the Fifth Republic. In this speech, de Gaulle extolled the virtues of the Republic, stating: "Following the Battle of Sedan, the Republic was presented to the nation as a means of addressing the country's crisis." Without explicitly naming the individuals in question, General de Gaulle nevertheless made a veiled claim to their legacy to justify his actions and legitimate his conception of the Republic. As Olivier Le Trocquer observed, the speech gave rise to a significant political question: whether the legitimacy of public salvation, as embodied by the Republic, should prevail over existing legality in times of crisis. In 2020, the 150th anniversary was commemorated at the Panthéon with the participation of the President of the Republic, who presided over a naturalization ceremony.

The relative erasure of September 4 from collective memory can be explained by some factors. For those who lived through this period, the memory of this founding act was overshadowed by the tragic events that preceded and followed it. September 4 was situated within a "terrible year", encompassing the invasion of the country, the armistice, the siege of the capital, and the events of the Commune. These events evoked, above all, the suffering and humiliation of the people. In a letter written in 1874, Léon Gambetta described the profound sadness that overwhelmed him during his carriage ride to the Hôtel de Ville on that fateful day. "The return of this painful and tragic anniversary invariably engenders a profound sense of melancholy and despondency within me." Furthermore, one of the most enduring images in collective memory from this period is that of Gambetta leaving besieged Paris by balloon. This spectacular and symbolic event embodied the resistance and courage of the Republican government, which the proclamation of September 4 could never achieve. According to historian Francis Démier, the Republic first imposed itself as the death certificate of the Second Empire, a victim of a lost war, not of a revolution.

== See also ==
- Attempted Bourbon monarchy
- Government of National Defense
- 16 May 1877 crisis

== Bibliography ==
- Anceau, Éric (2023). "Le 4 septembre 1870 : Une révolution de velours sur un volcan". Révolutions françaises : Du Moyen ge à nos jours. Tempus (No. 927) (in French). Paris: Éditions Perrin. pp. 237–254. ISBN 978-2-262-10488-7.
- Bonhomme, Éric (2000). La République improvisée : l'exercice du pouvoir sous la Défense nationale, 4 septembre 1870 – 8 février 1871. Passés composés (in French). Saint-Pierre-du-Mont: Eurédit. ISBN 2-84564-004-8.
- Cornut-Gentille, Pierre (2020). Le 4 septembre 1870 : L'invention de la République. Tempus (in French). Paris: Perrin. ISBN 978-2-262-08776-0.
- Garrigues, Jean; Lacombrade, Philippe (2023). La France au XIXe siècle : 1814–1914. Collection U (in French) (5th ed.). Malakoff: Armand Colin. ISBN 978-2-200-63312-7.
- Grévy, Jérôme (1998). "Les républicains dans la tourmente". La République des opportunistes (1870–1885). Terre d'histoire (in French). Paris: Perrin. pp. 7–28. ISBN 9782262013448.
- Le Trocquer, Olivier (1998). "Des rites de l'événement à l'événement ritualisé : L'effacement interprétatif d'une révolution, 4 septembre 1870". Hypothèses (in French). 1 (1). Sorbonne Université Presses: 31–39. doi:10.3917/hyp.971.0031. Archived from the original on June 21, 2023.
- Le Trocquer, Olivier (2003). "Le 4 septembre 1870 ou l'image déplacée". L'événement : Images, représentations, mémoire (in French). Grânes: Éditions Créaphis. pp. 49–66. ISBN 2-913610-29-3.
- Le Trocquer, Olivier (2006). "Mémoire et interprétation du 4 septembre 1870 : Le sens de l'oubli". Temporalités (in French) (5 « Mémoire et Histoire »). doi:10.4000/temporalites.283. Archived from the original on April 16, 2012.

Political testimonials

- Simon, Jules (1874). Souvenirs du Quatre Septembre : Origine et chute du Second Empire (in French). Paris: Michel Lévy. Archived from the original on September 17, 2024.
- Dréolle, Ernest (1871). La journée du 4 septembre au Corps Législatif : Avec notes sur les journées du 3 et du 5 septembre, souvenirs politiques (in French). Paris: Amyot. Archived from the original on September 15, 2024.
