= Léon Gambetta =

French politician (1838–1882)

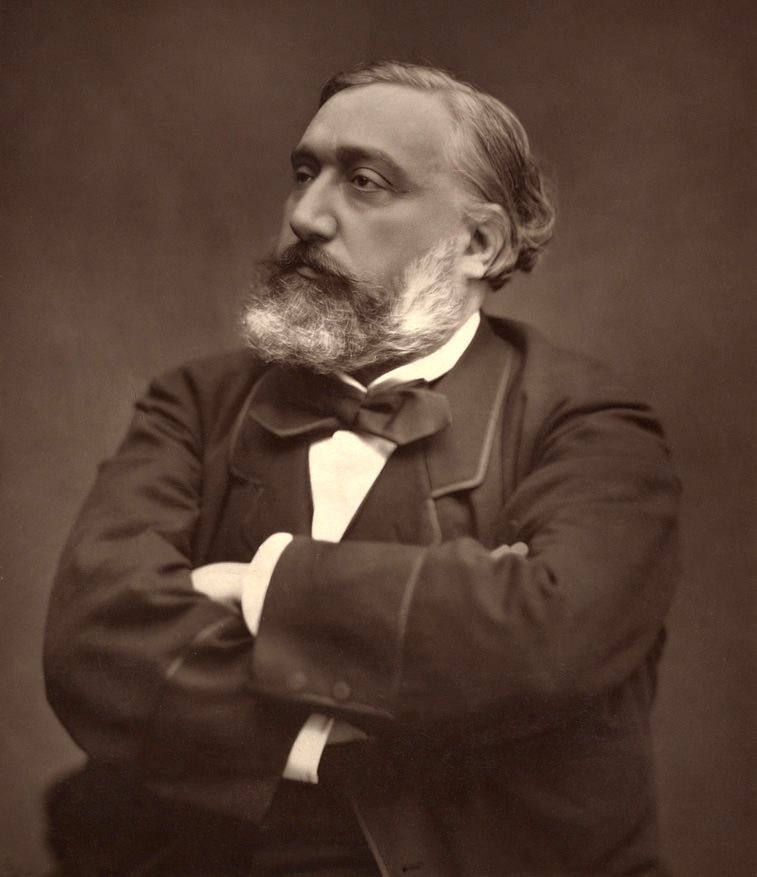
- Gambetta photographed by Étienne Carjat

Prime Minister of France
- In office 14 November 1881 – 30 January 1882
- President: Jules Grévy
- Preceded by: Jules Ferry
- Succeeded by: Charles de Freycinet

President of the Chamber of Deputies
- In office 31 January 1879 – 27 October 1881
- Preceded by: Jules Grévy
- Succeeded by: Henri Brisson

Minister of the Interior
- In office 4 September 1870 – 6 February 1871
- Prime Minister: Louis-Jules Trochu
- Preceded by: Henri Chevreau
- Succeeded by: Emmanuel Arago

Member of the Chamber of Deputies
- In office 8 June 1869 – 31 December 1882
- Constituency: Bouches-du-Rhône (1869–71); Bas-Rhin (1871); Seine (1871–76); Paris (1876–82)

Personal details
- Born: 2 April 1838 Cahors, France
- Died: 31 December 1882 (aged 44) Sèvres, France
- Party: Moderate Republican (1863–1869); Republican far-left (1869–1871); Republican Union (1871–1882)
- Education: University of Paris
- Profession: Lawyer
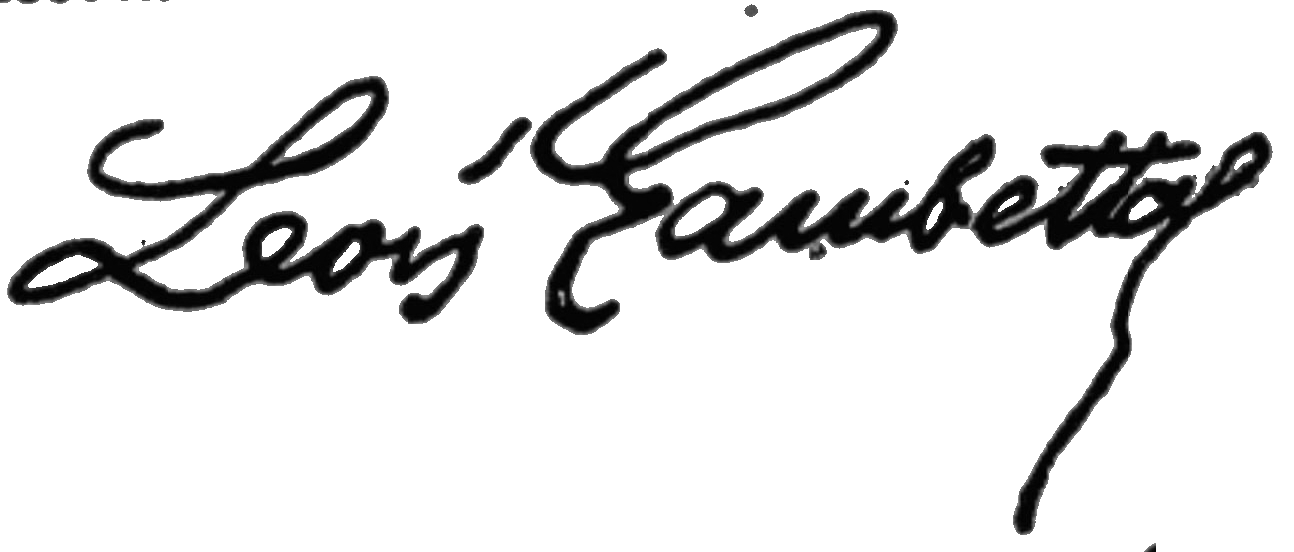
- Signature

Léon Gambetta (French pronunciation: [leɔ̃ ɡɑ̃bɛta]; 2 April 1838 – 31 December 1882) was a French lawyer and republican politician who proclaimed the Third Republic in 1870 and played a prominent role in its early government.

Gambetta was a strong believer in democratic systems of government, believing that the victory of democracy in France meant (amongst other gains) “protection of the legitimate and basic rights of labour, the raising up morally and materially of the lower classes, but without compromising the position of those favoured by wealth and talent.”

== Early life and education ==
Born in Cahors, Gambetta is said to have inherited his vigour and eloquence from his father, a Genoese grocer who had married a Frenchwoman named Massabie. At the age of fifteen, Gambetta lost the sight of his right eye in an accident, and it eventually had to be removed. Despite this disability, he distinguished himself at school in Cahors. He then worked at his father's grocery shop in Cahors, the Bazar génois ("Genoese bazaar"), and in 1857 went to study at the Faculty of Law of Paris. His temperament gave him great influence among the students of the Quartier latin, and he was soon known as an inveterate enemy of the imperial government.

== Career ==
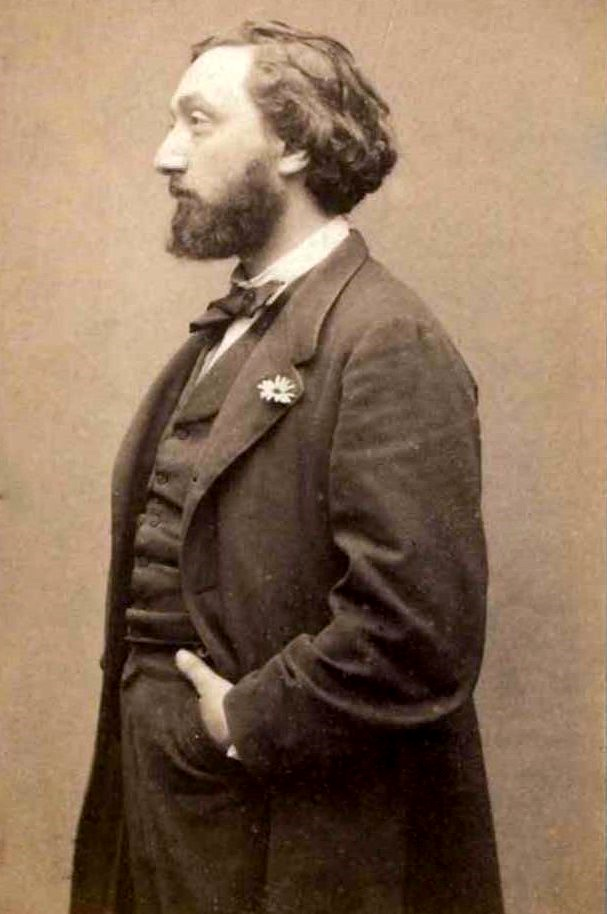
Carte de visite of Léon Gambetta by Lége, Paris.

Gambetta was called to the bar in 1859. He was admitted to the Conférence Molé in 1861 and wrote to his father, "It is no mere lawyers club, but a veritable political assembly with a left, a right, a center; legislative proposals are the sole subject of discussion. It is there that are formed all the political men of France; it is a veritable training ground for the tribune." Gambetta, like many other French orators, learned the art of public speaking at the Molé.

However, although he contributed to a Liberal review edited by Challemel-Lacour, Gambetta did not make much of an impression until, on 17 November 1868, he was selected to defend the journalist Delescluze. Delescluze was being prosecuted for having promoted a monument to the representative Baudin, who had been killed while resisting the coup d'état of 1851, and Gambetta seized his opportunity to attack both the coup d'état and the government with a vigour which made him immediately famous.

In May 1869, he was elected to the Assembly, both by a district in Paris and another in Marseille, defeating Hippolyte Carnot for the former constituency and Adolphe Thiers and Ferdinand de Lesseps for the latter. He chose to sit for Marseille, and lost no opportunity of attacking the Empire in the Assembly. Early in his political career, Gambetta was influenced by Le Programme de Belleville, the seventeen statutes that defined the radical program in French politics throughout the Third Republic.

This made him the leading defender of the lower classes in the Corps Législatif. On 17 January 1870, he spoke out against naming a new Imperial Lord Privy Seal, putting him into direct conflict with the regime's de facto prime minister, Émile Ollivier. (see Reinach, J., Discours et plaidoyers politiques de M. Gambetta, I.102 – 113) His powerful oratory caused a complete breakdown of order in the Corps. The Monarchist Right continually tried to interrupt his speech, only to have Gambetta's supporters on the Left attack them. The disagreement reached a high point when M. le Président Schneider asked him to bring his supporters back into order. Gambetta responded, thundering, "l'indignation exclut le calme!" ("indignation excludes calm!") (Reinach, Discours et plaidoyers politiques de M. Gambetta, I.112)

It was also in 1869 that Gambetta was initiated into Freemasonry at "La Réforme" lodge in Paris, sponsored by Louis-Antoine Garnier-Pagès. In this lodge he met Gustave Naquet and Maurice Rouvier.

=== Proclamation of the Republic ===
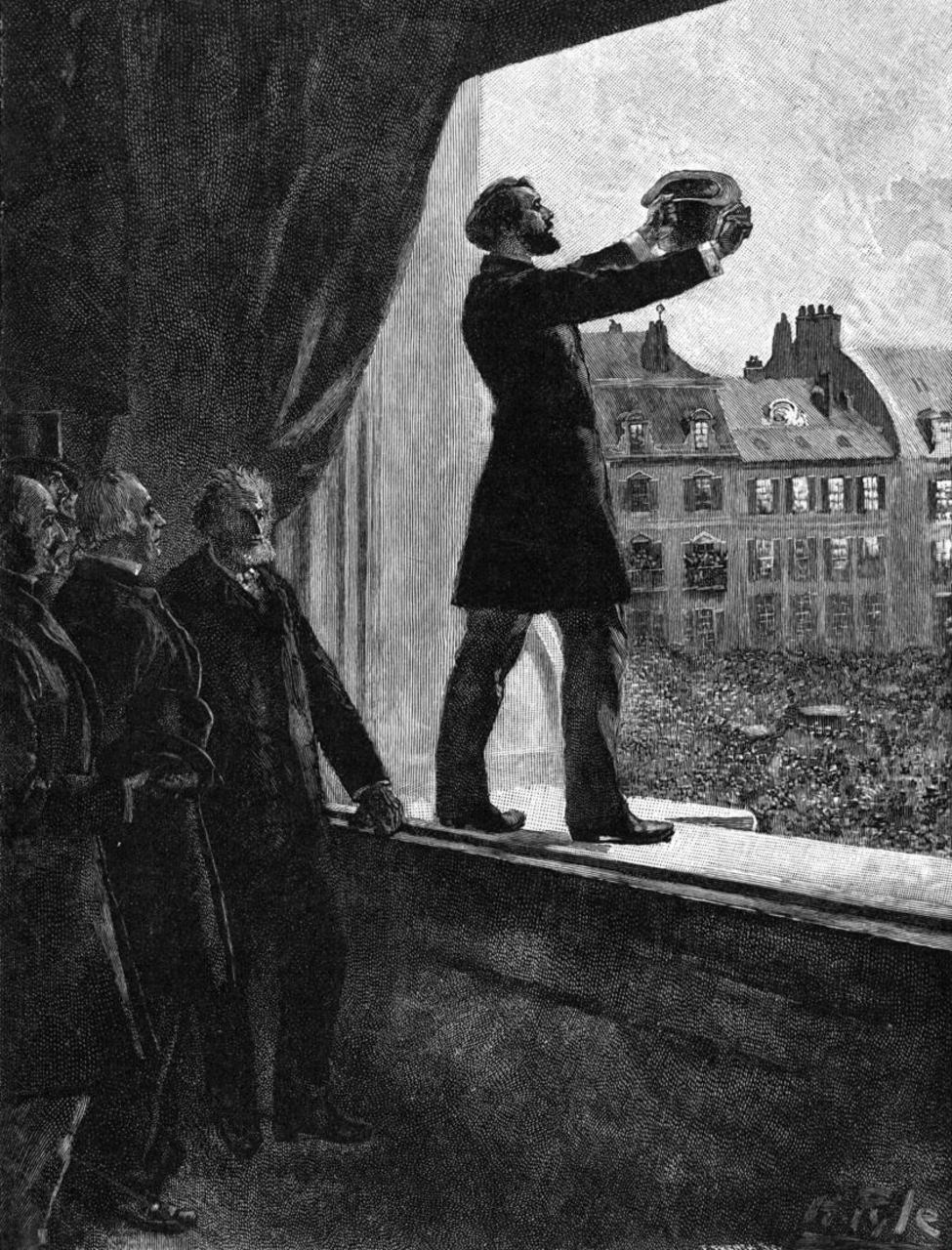
Gambetta proclaiming the French Republic from the Hôtel de Ville, in a painting by Howard Pyle

Gambetta opposed the declaration of the Franco-Prussian War. He did not, however, like some of his colleagues, refuse to vote for funds for the army. On 2 September 1870, the French Army suffered a disastrous defeat at the Battle of Sedan, in which the emperor Napoleon III surrendered and was taken prisoner. The news arrived in Paris on the night of 3 September, and early on 4 September large-scale protests began in the capital.

Parisians broke into the Palais Bourbon, meeting place of the Chamber of Deputies, interrupting a session and calling for a Republic. Later that day, from the Hôtel de Ville, Gambetta proclaimed the French Republic to a large crowd gathered in the Place de l'Hôtel-de-Ville:

Frenchmen! The people has forestalled the Chamber which was wavering.

To save the Nation in danger, it has asked for the Republic.

It has put its representatives not in power, but in peril.

The Republic was victorious against the invasion of 1792: the Republic is proclaimed.

The Revolution has been carried in the name of the right of public safety.

Citizens, watch over the City which is entrusted to you, tomorrow, along with the army, you shall avenge the Nation!

=== Government of National Defense ===
Gambetta was one of the first members of the new Government of National Defense, becoming Minister of the Interior. He advised his colleagues to leave Paris and run the government from some provincial city.

Departure of Léon Gambetta and Eugène Spuller aboard the Armand-Barbès, 1870

This advice was rejected because of fear of another revolution in Paris, and a delegation to organize resistance in the provinces was dispatched to Tours, but when this was seen to be ineffective, Gambetta himself left Paris 7 October with Eugène Spuller in a coal gas-filled balloon—the "Armand-Barbès"—and upon arriving at Tours took control as minister of the interior and of war. Aided by Freycinet, a young officer of engineers, as his assistant secretary of war, he quickly organized an army, which might have relieved Paris if Metz had held out, but Bazaine's surrender brought the army of the Prussian prince Friederich Karl back into the field, and success was impossible. After the French defeat near Orléans early in December the seat of government was transferred to Bordeaux.

== Self-exile to San Sebastián ==
Gambetta had hoped for a republican majority in the general elections on 8 February 1871. These hopes vanished when the conservatives and Monarchists won nearly 2/3 of the six hundred Assembly seats. He had won elections in eight different départements, but the ultimate victor was the Orléanist Adolphe Thiers, winner of twenty-three elections. Thiers's conservative and bourgeois intentions clashed with the growing expectations of political power by the lower classes. Hoping to continue his policy of "guerre à outrance" against the Prussian invaders, he tried in vain to rally the Assembly to the war cause. However, Thiers' peace treaty on 1 March 1871 ended the conflict. Gambetta, disgusted with the Assembly's unwillingness to fight, resigned and quit France for San Sebastián in Spain.

Meanwhile, the Paris Commune had taken control of the city. Despite his earlier career, Gambetta voiced his opposition to the Commune in a letter to Antonin Proust, his former secretary while Minister of the Interior, in which he referred to the Commune as "les horribles aventures dans lesquelles s'engage ce qui reste de cette malheureuse France" or "the ghastly madness blighting what remains of our poor France".

== Return ==
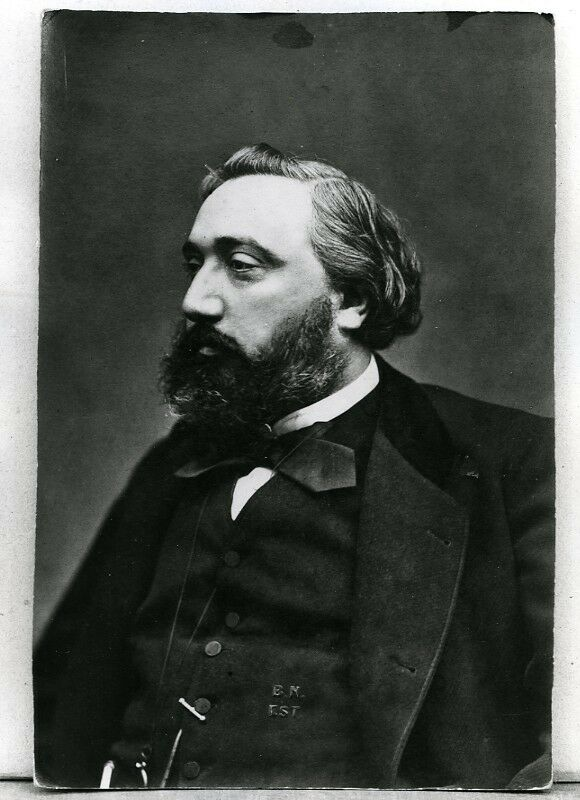
Photo of Gambetta by Nadar, 1871

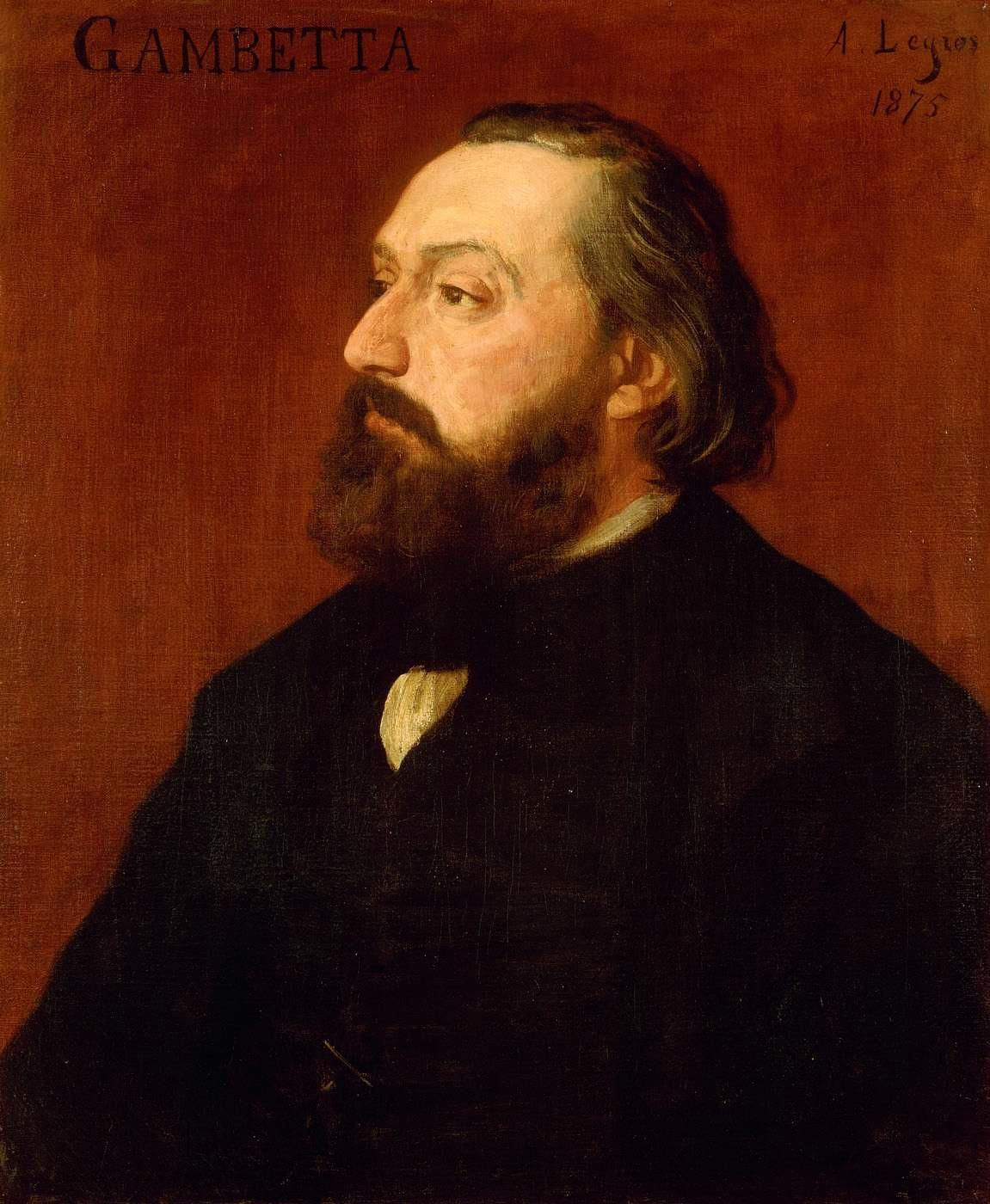
Léon Gambetta, by Alphonse Legros (1875).

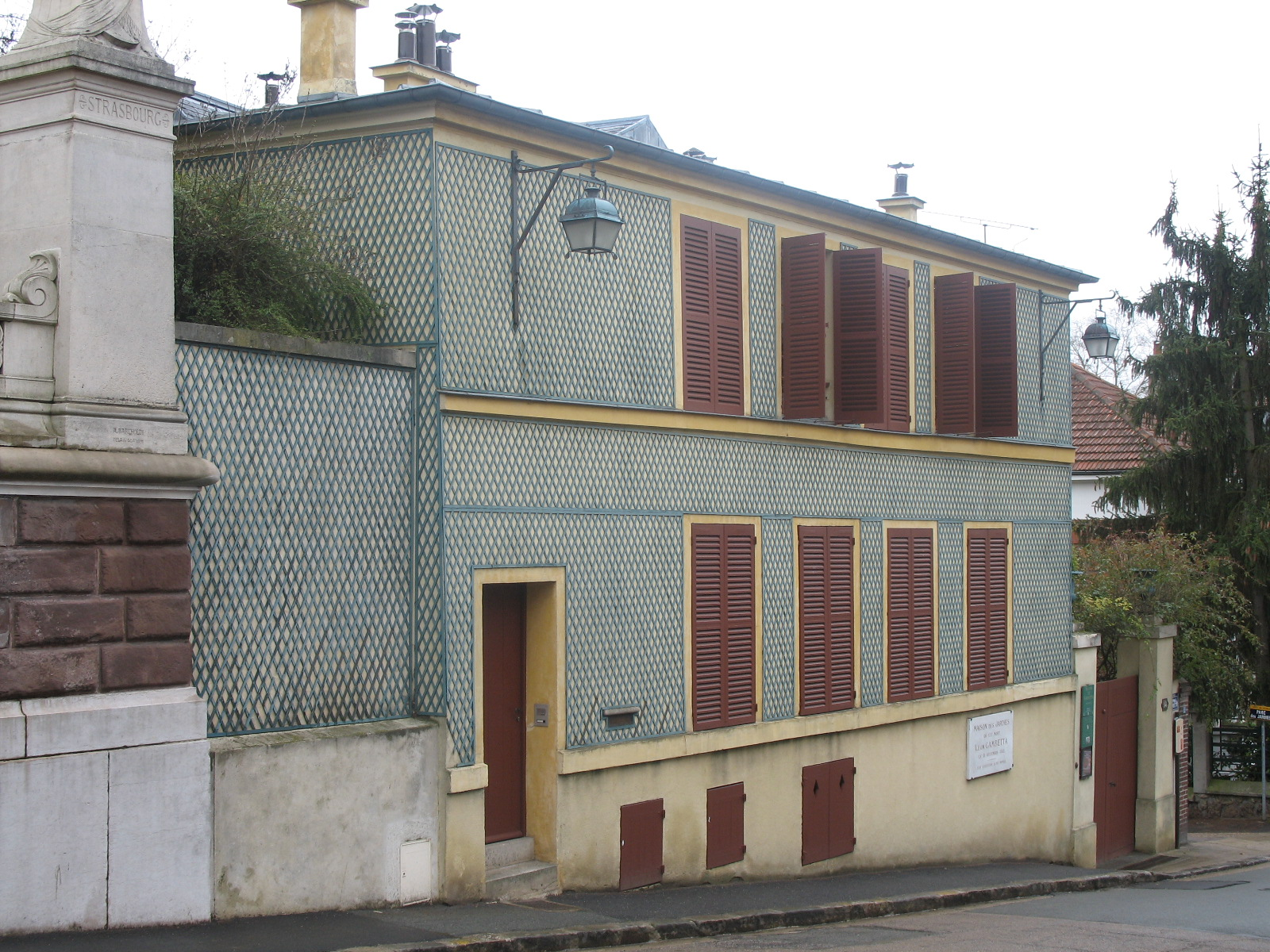
Maison des Jardies, the place where Gambetta died in Sèvres.

On 24 June 1871, a letter was sent by Gambetta to his Parisian confidant, Dr. Édouard Fieuzal:

Je veux déjouer l'intrigue de parti de ceux qui vont répétant que je refuse toute candidature à Paris. Non. J'accepte au contraire avec fierté et reconnaissance les suffrages de la démocratie Parisienne si elle veut m'honorer de son choix. Je suis prêt.

There is no truth in the rumours being spread that I am refusing to stand for election in Paris. No. I accept, to the contrary, with pride and gratitude the Parisians' votes, if they would do me the honor of choosing me. I am prepared. (Lettres de Gambetta, no. 122)

Gambetta returned to the political stage and won on three separate ballots. On 5 November 1871 he established a journal, La Republique française, which soon became the most influential in France. His public speeches were more effective than those delivered in the Assembly, especially the one at Bordeaux. When Adolphe Thiers resigned in May 1873, and a Royalist, Marshal MacMahon, was placed at the head of the government, Gambetta urged his friends to a moderate course. By his tact, parliamentary dexterity and eloquence, he was instrumental in voting in the French Constitutional Laws of 1875 in February 1875. He gave this policy the appropriate name of "opportunism," and became one of the leader of the "Opportunist Republicans." On 4 May 1877, he denounced "clericalism" as the enemy. During the 16 May 1877 crisis, Gambetta, in a speech at Lille on 15 August called on President MacMahon se soumettre ou se démettre, to submit to parliament's majority or to resign. Gambetta then campaigned to rouse the republican party throughout France, which culminated in a speech at Romans (18 September 1878) formulating its programme. MacMahon, unwilling both to resign and to provoke civil war, had no choice but to dismiss his advisers and form a moderate republican ministry under the premiership of Dufaure.

When the downfall of the Dufaure cabinet brought about MacMahon's resignation, Gambetta declined to become a candidate for the presidency, but supported Jules Grévy; nor did he attempt to form a ministry, but accepted the office of president of the chamber of deputies in January 1879. This position did not prevent his occasionally descending from the presidential chair to make speeches, one of which, advocating an amnesty to the communards, was especially memorable. Although he directed the policy of the various ministries from behind the scenes, he evidently thought that the time was not ripe for asserting openly his direction of the policy of the Republic, and seemed inclined to observe a neutral attitude as far as possible. However, events hurried him on, and early in 1881 he headed off a movement for restoring scrutin de liste, or the system by which deputies are returned by the entire department which they represent, so that each elector votes for several representatives at once, in place of scrutin d'arrondissement, the system of small constituencies, giving one member to each district and one for vote to each elector. A bill to re-establish scrutin de liste was passed by the Assembly on 19 May 1881, but rejected by the Senate on 19 June.

This personal rebuff could not alter the fact that his name was on the lips of voters at the election. His supporters won a large majority, and Jules Ferry's cabinet quickly resigned. Gambetta was unwillingly asked by Grévy on 24 November 1881 to form a ministry, known as Le Grand Ministère. Many suspected him of desiring a dictatorship; unjust attacks were directed against him from all sides, and his cabinet fell on 26 January 1882, after only sixty-six days. Had he remained in office, he would have cultivated the British alliance and cooperated with Britain in Egypt; and when the succeeding Freycinet government shrank from that enterprise only to see it undertaken with signal success by Britain alone, Gambetta's foresight was quickly justified.

On 31 December 1882, at his house in Ville d'Avray, near Sèvres, he died from intestine or stomach cancer. Even though he was wounded a month earlier from an accidental revolver discharge, the injury had not been life-threatening. Five artists, Jules Bastien-Lepage, a realist painter, Antonin Proust, defender of the vanguard who Gambetta had named Minister of Fine Arts, Léon Bonnat, an academic painter, Alexandre Falguière, who did his mortuary mask, and his personal photographer Étienne Carjat all sat at his death-bed, making five widely different representations of him which were each published by the press the following day. His public funeral was on 6 January 1883.

== Personal life ==
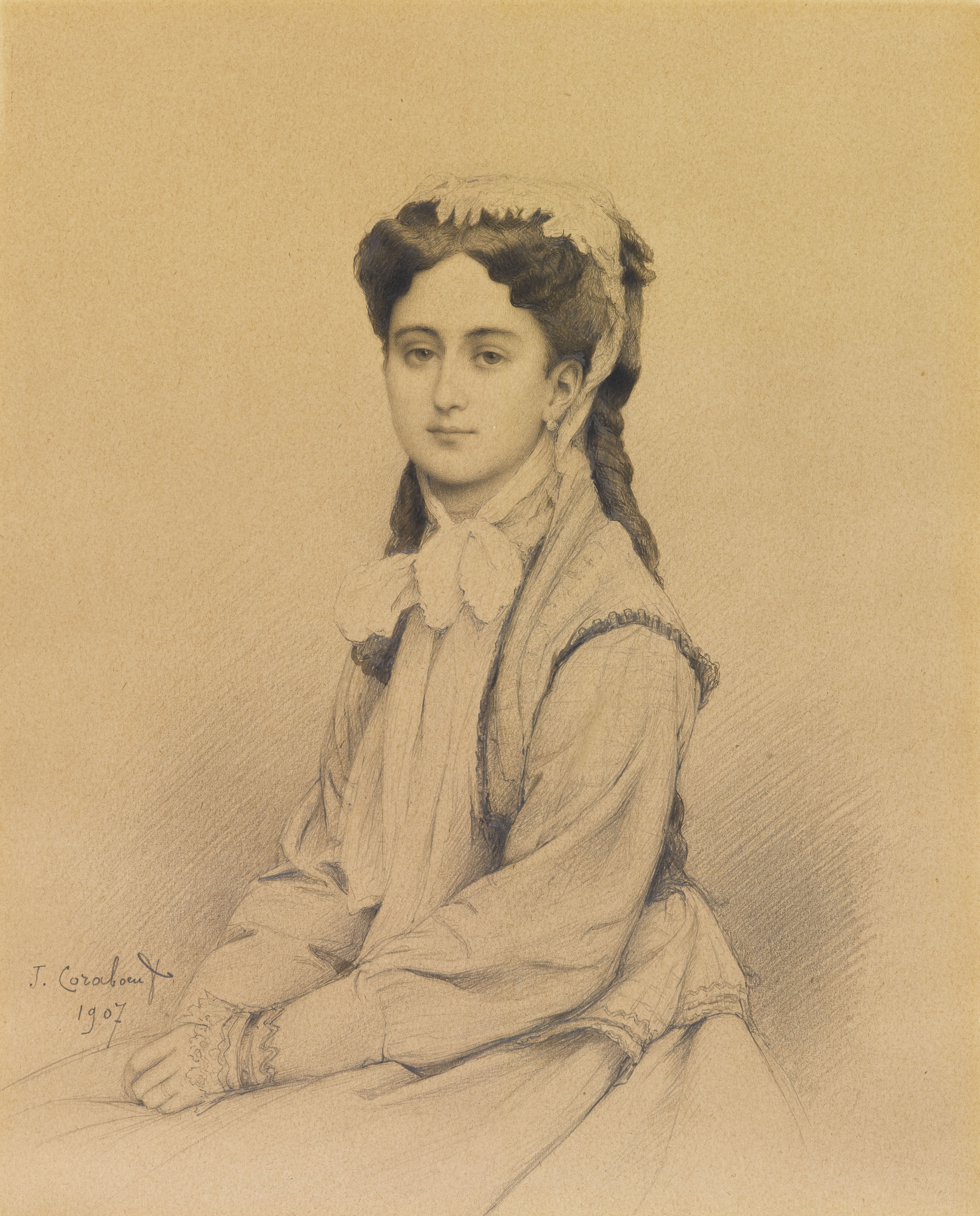
Léonie Léon in 1875

The love of his life was his connection with Léonie Léon, the full details of which were not known to the public until her death in 1906. She was the daughter of a creole French artillery officer. Gambetta fell in love with her in 1871. She became his mistress, and the liaison lasted until he died. Gambetta constantly urged her to marry him during this period, but she always refused, fearing to compromise his career; she remained, however, his confidante and intimate adviser in all his political plans. It seems she had just consented to become his wife, and the date of the marriage had been fixed, when the accident which caused his death occurred in her presence. Contradictory accounts of this fatal episode exist, but it was certainly accidental, and not suicide. Her influence on Gambetta was absorbing, both as lover and as politician, and the correspondence which has been published shows how much he depended upon her.

However, some of her later recollections are untrustworthy. For example, she claimed that a meeting took place in 1878 between Gambetta and Bismarck. That Gambetta after 1875 felt strongly that relations between France and Germany might be improved, and that he made it his object, by travelling incognito, to become better acquainted with Germany and the adjoining states, may be accepted, but M. Laur appears to have exaggerated the extent to which any actual negotiations took place. On the other hand, the increased knowledge of Gambetta's attitude towards European politics which later information has supplied confirms the view that when he died, France had prematurely lost a clear thinker whom she could ill spare. In April 1905 a monument by Dalou to his memory at Bordeaux was unveiled by President Loubet.

== Legacy ==
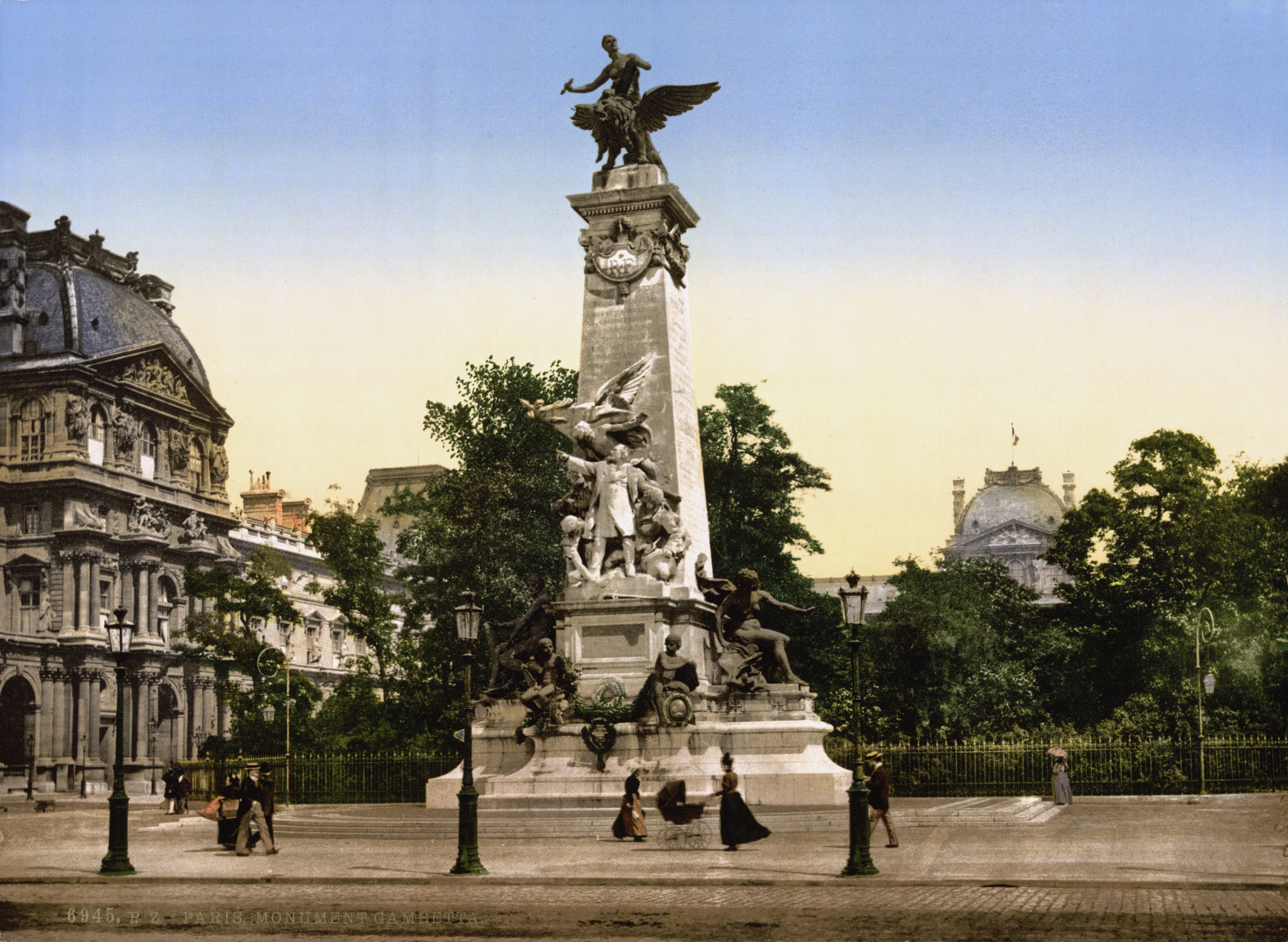
Gambetta monument at the Louvre, c.1900

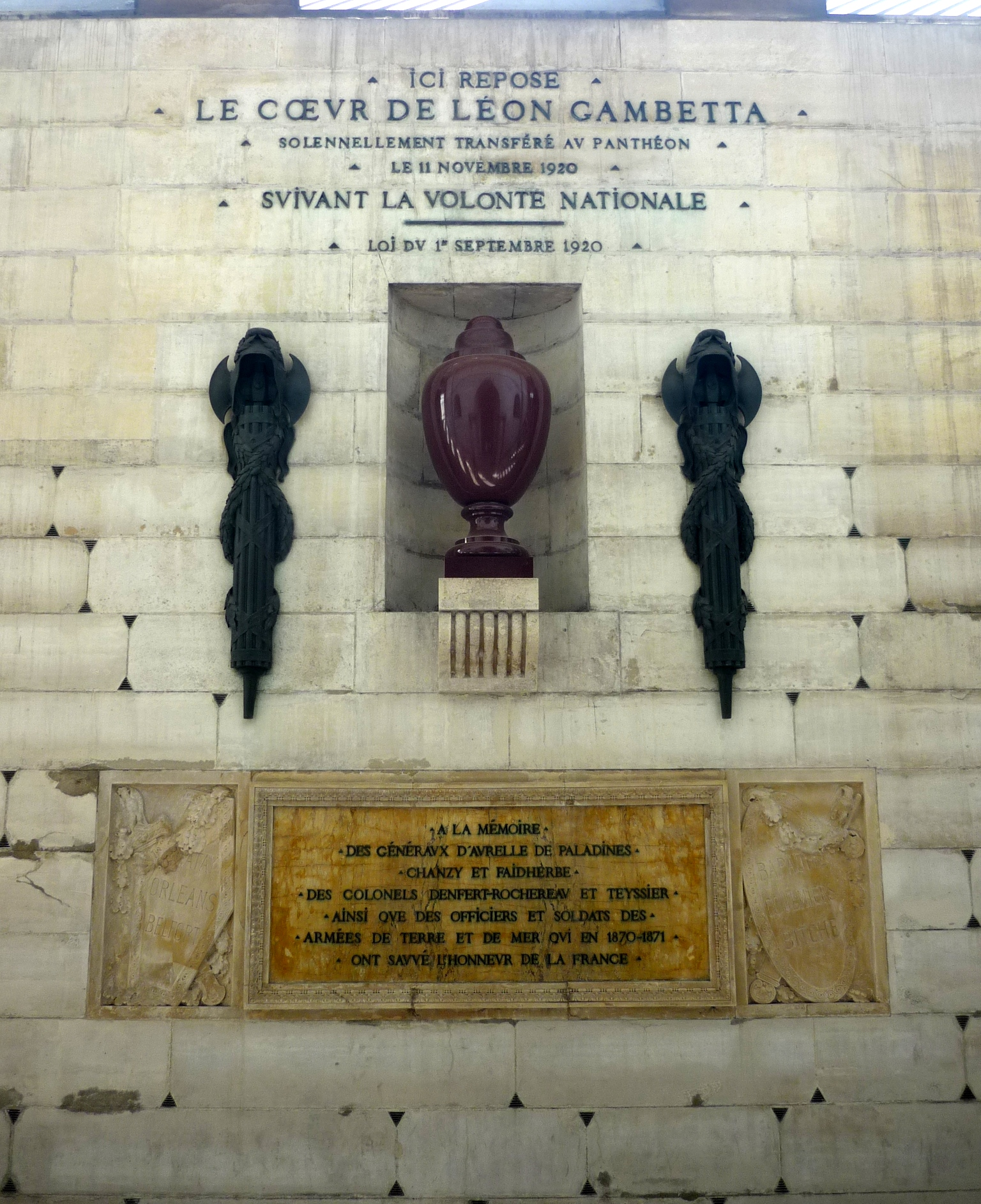
Urn containing the heart of Gambetta at the Panthéon

Gambetta rendered France three inestimable services: by preserving her self-respect through the gallantry of the resistance he organized during the Franco-Prussian War, by his tact in persuading extreme partisans to accept a moderate Republic, and by his energy in overcoming the usurpation attempted by the advisers of Marshal MacMahon. His death at forty-four cut short a career which had given promise of still greater things, for he had real statesmanship in his conceptions of the future of his country, and he had an eloquence which would have been potent in the education of his supporters.

Gambetta's proclamation of the Republic and call for a Levée en masse left a lasting impact on Germany in the decades following. Future Field Marshall Colmar Freiherr von der Goltz wrote in 1877:

Should it come to pass that...our German fatherland suffers a defeat like that of the French at Sedan, I would wish a man emerges who knows how to inspire the sort of absolute resistance Gambetta tried to organize.

In October 1918, when Germany was on the verge of defeat during the First World War, industrialist Walther Rathenau called for a German Levée en masse to reverse the deteriorating situation. Conservative Revolutionary Edgar Jung was also inspired by Gambetta. Adolf Hitler favorably contrasted Gambetta's actions with that of the post-revolutionary leaders of the Weimar Republic:

With the collapse of France at Sedan, the people rose in revolution to save the fallen tricolor! The war continued with new energy! The revolutionaries bravely fought countless battles. The will to defend the state created the French Republic in 1870. It was a symbol not of dishonor but of the upstanding will to preserve the nation. French national honor was revived by the Third Republic. What a contrast to our republic!

A tall monument to Léon Gambetta was planned in 1884 and erected in 1888 in the central space of the Louvre Palace, now Cour Napoléon. That initiative carried heavy political symbolism, since Gambetta was widely viewed as the founder of the Third Republic, and his outsized celebration in the middle of Napoleon III's Louvre expansion thus affirmed the final victory of republicanism over monarchism nearly a century after the French Revolution – in the same vein, the Gambetta monument visually overpowered Napoleon's comparatively diminutive Arc de Triomphe du Carrousel. Most of the monument's sculptures were in bronze and in 1941 were melted for military use by German occupying forces. What remained of the Gambetta Monument was dismantled in 1954.

A stone urn containing Gambetta's heart was placed in 1920 in the monumental staircase leading to the crypt of the Panthéon in Paris. The Russian red quartzite stone that was used for the urn was part of the same shipment that was used for Napoleon's tomb at Les Invalides.

== Gambetta's Ministry, 14 November 1881 – 26 January 1882 ==
- Léon Gambetta – President of the Council and Minister of Foreign Affairs
- Jean-Baptiste Campenon – Minister of War
- Pierre Waldeck-Rousseau – Minister of the Interior
- François Allain-Targé – Minister of Finance
- Jules Cazot – Minister of Justice
- Maurice Rouvier – Minister of the Colonies and of Commerce
- Auguste Gougeard – Minister of Marine
- Paul Bert – Minister of Public Instruction and Worship
- Antonin Proust – Minister of the Arts
- Paul Devès – Minister of Agriculture
- David Raynal – Minister of Public Works
- Adolphe Cochery – Minister of Posts and Telegraphs

== See also ==
- List of works by Alexandre Falguière

== Sources and further reading ==
- Bury, J. P. T. Gambetta and the Making of the Third Republic (Longman, 1973).
- Bury, J. P. T. "Gambetta and the Revolution of 4 September 1870." Cambridge Historical Journal 4#3 (1934): 263–282. online.
- Everdell, William R. The End of Kings: A History of Republics and Republicans. Chicago: University of Chicago Press, 2000. ISBN 978-0226224824
- Foley, Susan, and Charles Sowerwine. A Political Romance: Léon Gambetta, Léonie Léon and the Making of the French Republic, 1872–82 (Springer, 2012).
- Foley, Susan. "'Your letter is divine, irresistible, infernally seductive': Léon Gambetta, Léonie Léon, and Nineteenth-Century Epistolary Culture." French Historical Studies 30.2 (2007): 237–267 online.
- Lehning, James R. "Gossiping about Gambetta: Contested Memories in the Early Third Republic." French Historical Studies (1993): 237–254 online.
- Marzials, Frank Thomas. Life of Léon Gambetta (WH Allen, 1890) online.

=== Primary sources ===
- Gambetta, Léon, and Violette M. Montagu. Gambetta: Life and Letters (T. Fisher Unwin, 1910).
- Gambetta. Discours et plaidoyers politiques de M. Gambetta, published by J. Reinach in 11 vols. (Paris, 1881–1886)
- Gambetta. Dépêches, circulaires, décrets... in 2 vols. (Paris, 1886–1891)
- F Laur Le Coeur de Gambetta (1907, Eng. trans., 1908) contains the correspondence with Léonie Leon
- Caricatures de Léon Gambetta Caricatures et Caricature

Political offices
Preceded by Henri Chevreau	Minister of the Interior; 1870–1871	Succeeded by Emmanuel Arago
Preceded by Jules Grévy	President of the Chamber of Deputies; 1879–1881	Succeeded by Henri Brisson
Preceded by Jules Ferry	Prime Minister of France; 1881–1882	Succeeded by Charles de Freycinet
Preceded by Jules Barthélemy-Saint-Hilaire	Minister of Foreign Affairs; 1881–1882	Succeeded by Charles de Freycinet
