= Marie-Léonie =

Marie-Léonie is a feminine compound given name. Bearers of the name include:

- Marie-Léonie Graftieaux, birth name of Marcelle Dormoy (1895–1976), French couture fashion designer and model
- Marie-Léonie Léon (1838–1906), French courtesan
- Marie-Léonie Paradis (1840–1912), French-Canadian Catholic saint and sister

== See also ==
- Marie Léonie Jahn, birth name of Léonie Yahne (1867–1950), French comedic actress
- Marie Léonie Vanhoutte (1888–1967), French secret agent during World War I
- Marie Léonie Tietjens, a major character in Last Post, a Ford Madox Ford novel
