= La patrie en danger =

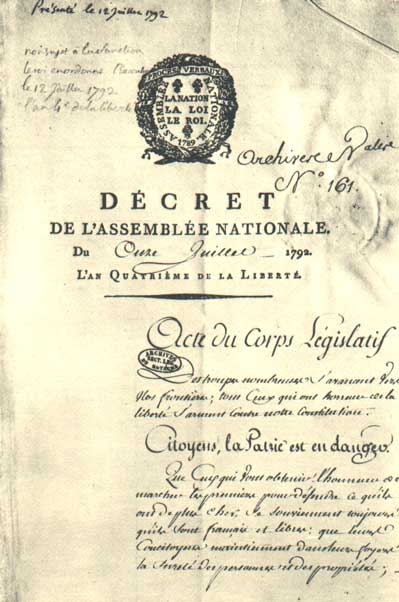
Declaration of the French National Assembly from 1792

La Patrie en danger (in English: "The country (motherland) in danger") was the start of a declaration by the French Assembly on 11 July 1792 in response to Prussia joining Austria in its war against France. Along with the levée en masse declared the next year, it was part of the growing idea of "people's war" which developed during the French Revolution, where ideology "not only conscripted manpower for the regular armies but also inspired ordinary people to fight on their own account."

The text of the declaration reads:

Citizens, the Fatherland is in danger. May those who will obtain the honor of marching first to defend what is most dear to them always remember that they are French and free; may their fellow citizens maintain the security of people and property in their homes; may the magistrates of the people watch attentively; may all, in calm courage, the attribute of true strength, wait for the signal of the law to act, and the fatherland will be saved. (Note: Original French text: "Citoyens, la Patrie est en danger. Que ceux qui vont obtenir l'honneur de marcher les premiers pour défendre ce qu'ils ont de plus cher se souviennent toujours qu'ils sont Français et libres; que leurs concitoyens la de maintiennent dans leur foyer la sûreté des personnes et des propriétés; que les magistrats du peuple veillent attentivement; que tous, dans un courage calme, attribut de la véritable force, attendent pour agir le signal de la loi, et la patrie sera sauvée.")

== Effects ==
According to Albert Soboul, the announcement of the fatherland in danger led to the unification of citizens at a time when their interests were jeopardized and intensified their participation both in political life and in military events. The text of the declaration was read on the streets of French cities and villages. In Paris alone, 15 thousand volunteers enrolled in the army, or about 2.5% of the population.

Along with the mass levy announced in 1793, this declaration became a stage in the development of the ideas of a "people's war" and an "armed nation" developed during the French Revolution. The ideology of the people's war was "not only to mobilize human resources for regular armies, but also to inspire ordinary people to fight at their own expense".

At the same time, the success of the declaration of 1792 was closely linked with the then prevailing revolutionary moods in French society. In 1799, an attempt to adopt a similar declaration in the face of military defeats in the War of the Second Coalition did not end there. As F. Wartell observes, seven years later, "the spirit of 1792 was already dead".

It was used in the Proclamation of the French Republic (September 4, 1870)

Frenchmen!

The People have outpaced the Chamber, which hesitated. To save the endangered Fatherland, they have demanded the Republic.

They have placed their representatives not in power but in peril.

The Republic defeated the invasion in 1792, and the Republic was proclaimed.

The Revolution is carried out in the name of law and public safety.

Citizens, watch over the City entrusted to you; tomorrow, you will be, along with the army, the avengers of the Fatherland!

City Hall of Paris, September 4, 1870.

Signed: Emmanuel Arago, Crémieux, Dorian, Jules Favre, Jules Ferry, Guyot-Montpayroux, Léon Gambetta, Garnier-Pagès, Magnin, Ordinaire, Tachard, Pelletan, E. Picard, Jules Simon.

== See also ==
- Louis Auguste Blanqui
- Jean Debry

== Bibliography ==
- Soboul, Albert (1975). The French Revolution 1787–1799. New York: Vintage. ISBN 0-394-71220-X.
- Tulard, Jean; Fayard, Jean-François; Fierro, Alfred (2002). "Patrie en Danger". Histoire et dictionnaire de la Révolution française. 1789—1799. Paris: Éditions Robert Laffont. p. 1023. ISBN 978-2-2210-8850-0.
- Wartelle, F. (2014). "«Patrie en Danger»". In Soboul, Albert (ed.). Dictionnaire historique de la Révolution française. Paris: Quadrige. p. 825. ISBN 978-2-13-053605-5.
