= Leon (surname) =

León/Leon
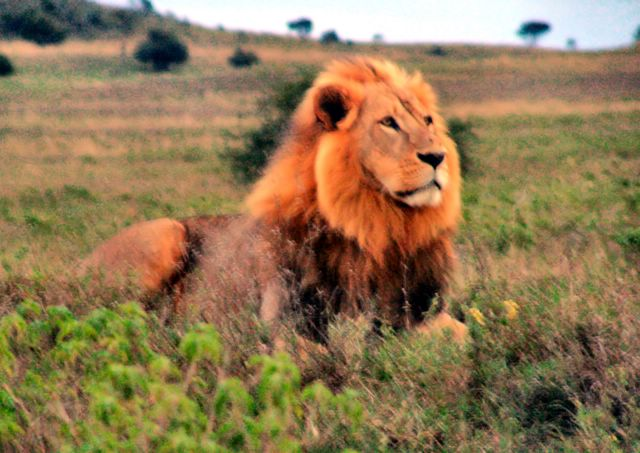

Origin
- Meaning: lion
- Region of origin: Spain, Greece, Israel.

León is a Spanish surname. A habitational name from León, a city in northwestern Spain, named with Latin legio, genitive legionis ‘legion’, a division of the Roman army. In Roman times the city was the garrison of the 7th Legion, known as the Legio Gemina. The city's name became reduced from Legion(em) to Leon(em), and in this form developed an unetymological association with the word for ‘lion’, Spanish león. This last name has also connections with French, Jewish and Greek history. In Spanish it is also a nickname for a fierce or brave warrior, from león ‘lion’. Leon is also found as a Greek family name from Greek leon ‘lion’.

People with the surname León or Leon include:

- Adriana Leon (born 1992), Canadian soccer player
- Adrianne León (born 1987), American actress
- Aldonza Alfonso de León (c. 1215–1266), illegitimate daughter of King Alfonso IX of León
- Alejandra León Gastélum (born 1976), Mexican politician
- Arcenio León (born 1986), Venezuelan baseball player
- Braulio Rafael León Villegas (1943–2024), Mexican Catholic prelate
- Danilo León (born 1967), Venezuelan baseball player
- Francis Leon (1844–1922), American actor
- Gabriella Leon (born 1996), English actress
- José León Asensio (1934–2024), Dominican businessman
- Leonardo León (born 1952), Chilean historian
- Léonie Léon (1838–1906), French mistress
- Noel León (born 2004), Mexican racing driver
- Pedro Pablo León (1943–2020), Peruvian footballer
- Pierre Leon (1837–1915), American sailor
- Sandy León (born 1989), Venezuelan baseball player
- Sarah Jorge León (born 1982), Dominican actress
- Tony Leon (born 1956), South African politician
- Tony Leon (American football) (1917–2002), American football player
- Valerie Leon (born 1943), English actress
- Wilfredo León (born 1993), Cuban–Polish volleyball player

== See also ==
- Liang (surname), a Chinese surname sometimes romanized as "Leon"
