= Georges-Eugène Haussmann =

French official who renovated Paris (1809–1891)

Baron Georges-Eugène Haussmann
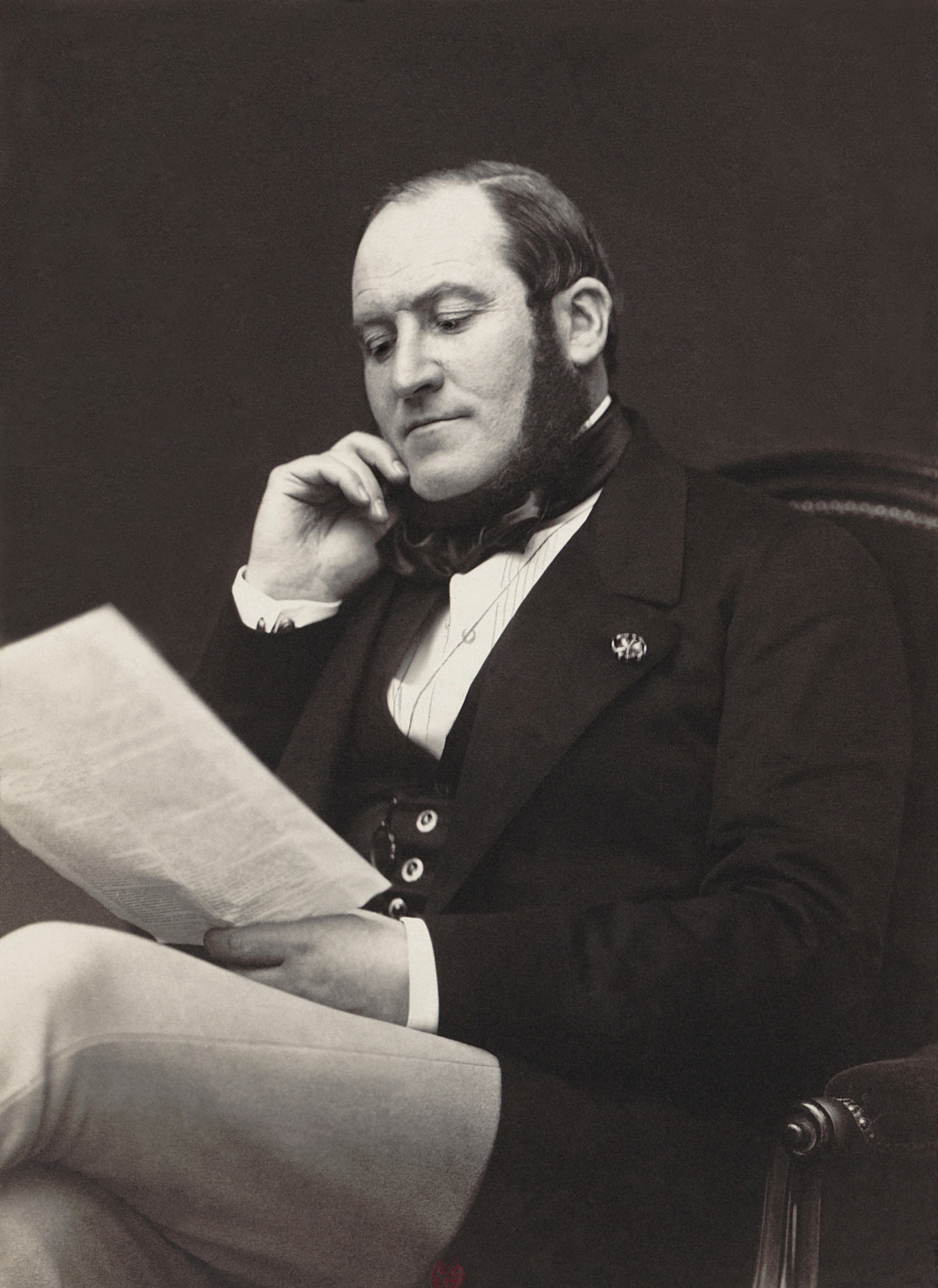

Member of the Chamber of Deputies
- In office 14 October 1877 – 27 October 1882
- Constituency: Corsica

Member of the Senate
- In office 9 June 1857 – 4 September 1870
- Appointed by: Napoleon III

Prefect of Seine
- In office 23 June 1853 – 5 January 1870
- Monarch: Napoleon III
- Preceded by: Jean-Jacques Berger
- Succeeded by: Henri Chevreau

Personal details
- Born: 27 March 1809 Paris, France
- Died: 11 January 1891 (aged 81) Paris, France
- Resting place: Père Lachaise Cemetery, Paris
- Party: Bonapartist
- Spouse: Octavie de Laharpe (m. 1838–1890)
- Children: Marie-Henriette; Valentine; Eugénie (illegitimate)
- Education: Lycée Condorcet
- Alma mater: Conservatoire de Paris
- Profession: Official, prefect

Georges-Eugène Haussmann (French: [ʒɔʁʒ øʒɛn osman]; 27 March 1809 – 11 January 1891), known as Baron Haussmann ([baʁɔ̃ osman]), was a French official who supervised a radical urban renewal programme of new boulevards, parks, and public works in Paris, referred to as Haussmann's renovation of Paris, aimed at introducing grandeur in the city. First a prefect in Var (1849–1850), Yonne (1850–1851), and Gironde (1851–1853), his skills as an administrator led to his appointment in Paris by Emperor Napoleon III in 1853.

The signature architectural landmark of his works was the Paris Opera, the largest theatre in the world, designed by Charles Garnier, crowning the centre of Napoleon III's new Paris. Haussmann completely rebuilt Paris above and below ground; on his own estimation by 1870 one in five streets in central Paris were his creation, while revamped sewers now ran alongside miles of pipes to distribute gas for thousands of new streetlights. With his right-hand Adolphe Alphand and at the Emperor's direction, a plan was laid out for four major parks at the cardinal points of the compass around the city: the Bois de Boulogne to the west, Bois de Vincennes to the east, Parc des Buttes Chaumont to the north, and Parc Montsouris to the south. The major parks and their smaller counterparts in the city were an immediate success with all classes of Parisians.

Critics forced his dismissal as prefect of Seine in 1870, but his vision of the city still defines much of Paris today. He was made a senator in 1857 and a grand cross of the Legion of Honour in 1862. The Boulevard Haussmann as well as Haussmann–Saint-Lazare station in Paris bear his name.

== Biography ==
=== Origins and early career ===
Haussmann was born on 27 March 1809, at 53 Rue du Faubourg-du-Roule, in the Beaujon neighbourhood of Paris, the son of Nicolas-Valentin Haussmann and Ève-Marie-Henriette-Caroline Dentzel, both of Alsatian families. His paternal grandfather Nicolas Haussmann was a deputy of the Legislative Assembly and National Convention, an administrator of the department of Seine-et-Oise and a commissioner to the army. His maternal grandfather was a general and a deputy of the National Convention: Georges Frédéric Dentzel, a baron of Napoleon's First Empire.

He began his schooling at the Collège Henri-IV and the Lycée Condorcet in Paris and then began to study law. At the same time, he studied music as a student at the Paris Conservatory, as he was a talented musician. Haussmann joined his father as an insurgent in the July Revolution of 1830, which deposed the Bourbon king Charles X in favor of his cousin, Louis Philippe, Duke of Orléans.

He was married to Octavie de Laharpe on 17 October 1838 in Bordeaux. They had two daughters: Henriette, who married the banker Camille Dollfus in 1860, and Valentine, who married Vicomte Maurice Pernéty, the chief of staff of his department, in 1865. Valentine divorced Pernéty in 1891 and then married Georges Renouard (1843–1897).

On 21 May 1831, Haussmann began his career in public administration. He was named the secretary-general of the prefecture of the department of Vienne at Poitiers. On 15 June 1832, he became the deputy prefect of Yssingeaux. Despite proving himself as a hard worker and able representative of the government, his arrogance, dictatorial manner, and habit of impeding his superiors led to his being continually passed over for promotion to prefect. He was posted as deputy prefect to the Lot-et-Garonne department at Nérac on 9 October 1832, the Ariège department at Saint-Girons on 19 February 1840, and the Gironde department at Blaye on 23 November 1841.

After the 1848 Revolution swept away the July Monarchy, establishing the Second Republic in its place, Haussmann's fortunes changed. In 1848, Louis-Napoléon Bonaparte, the nephew of Napoléon Bonaparte, became the first elected President of France. In January 1849, Haussmann travelled to Paris to meet the Minister of the Interior and the new President. He was deemed to be a loyal holdover from the civil service of the July Monarchy, and shortly after their meeting Louis-Napoléon granted Haussmann a promotion to prefect of the Var department at Draguignan. In 1850, he became the prefect of the Yonne department. In 1851 was appointed as prefect of Gironde out of Bordeaux.

In 1850, Louis Napoléon started an ambitious project to connect the Louvre to the Hôtel de Ville in Paris, by extending the Rue de Rivoli and create a new park, the Bois de Boulogne, on the outskirts of the city, but he was exasperated by the slow progress made by the incumbent prefect of Seine, Jean-Jacques Berger. Louis-Napoleon was highly popular, but he was blocked from running for re-election by the constitution of the Second French Republic. While he had a majority of the votes in the legislature at his disposal, he did not have the two-thirds majority needed to change the constitution.

At the end of December 1851, he staged a coup d'état, and in 1852 declared himself Emperor of the French under the title Napoleon III. In November 1852, a plebiscite overwhelmingly approved Napoleon's assumption of the throne, and he soon began searching for a new prefect of Seine to carry out his Paris reconstruction program.

The Emperor's Minister of the Interior, Victor de Persigny, interviewed the prefects of Rouen, Lille, Lyon, Marseille and Bordeaux for the Paris post. In his memoirs, he described his interview with Haussmann:

"It was Monsieur Haussmann who impressed me the most. It was a strange thing, but it was less his talents and his remarkable intelligence that appealed to me, but the defects in his character. I had in front of me one of the most extraordinary men of our time; big, strong, vigorous, energetic, and at the same time clever and devious, with a spirit full of resources. This audacious man wasn't afraid to show who he was. ... He told me all of his accomplishments during his administrative career, leaving out nothing; he could have talked for six hours without a break, since it was his favourite subject, himself. I wasn't at all displeased. ... It seemed to me that he was exactly the man I needed to fight against the ideas and prejudices of a whole school of economics, against devious people and skeptics coming from the Stock Market, against those who were not very scrupulous about their methods; he was just the man. Whereas a gentleman of the most elevated spirit, cleverness, with the most straight and noble character, would inevitably fail, this vigorous athlete ... full of audacity and skill, capable of opposing expedients with better expedients, traps with more clever traps, would certainly succeed. I told him about the Paris works and offered to put him in charge."

Persigny sent him to Napoleon III with the recommendation that he was exactly the man needed to carry out his renewal plans for Paris. On 22 June 1853, Napoleon III made him prefect of Seine. On 29 June, the Emperor gave him the mission of making the city healthier, less congested and grander. Haussmann held this post until 1870.

=== Rebuilding of Paris ===
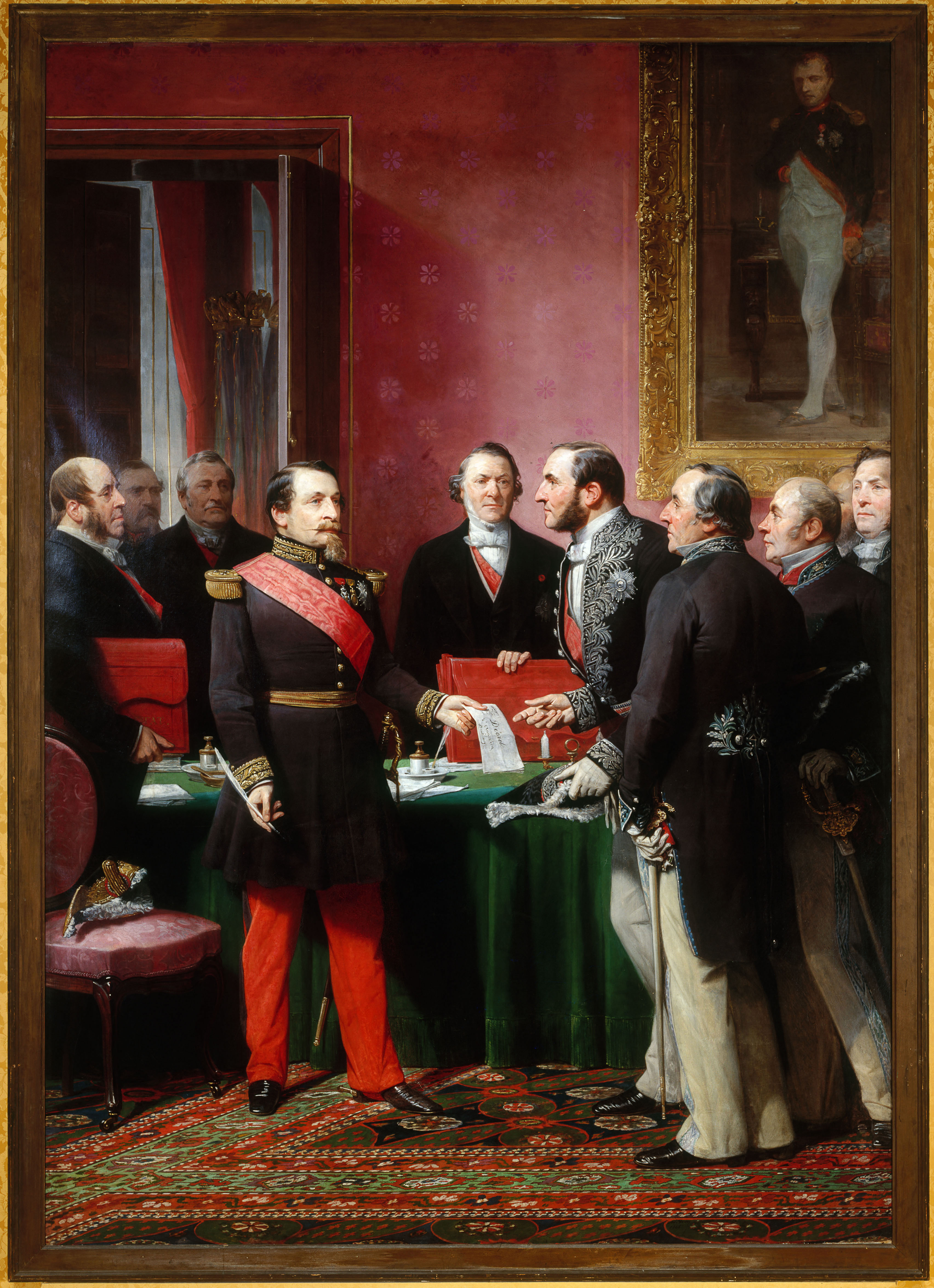
Napoleon handing over to Baron Haussmann the decree of annexation of suburban communes to Paris, 1860, by Adolphe Yvon. The annexation increased the city from twelve to the present twenty arrondissements.

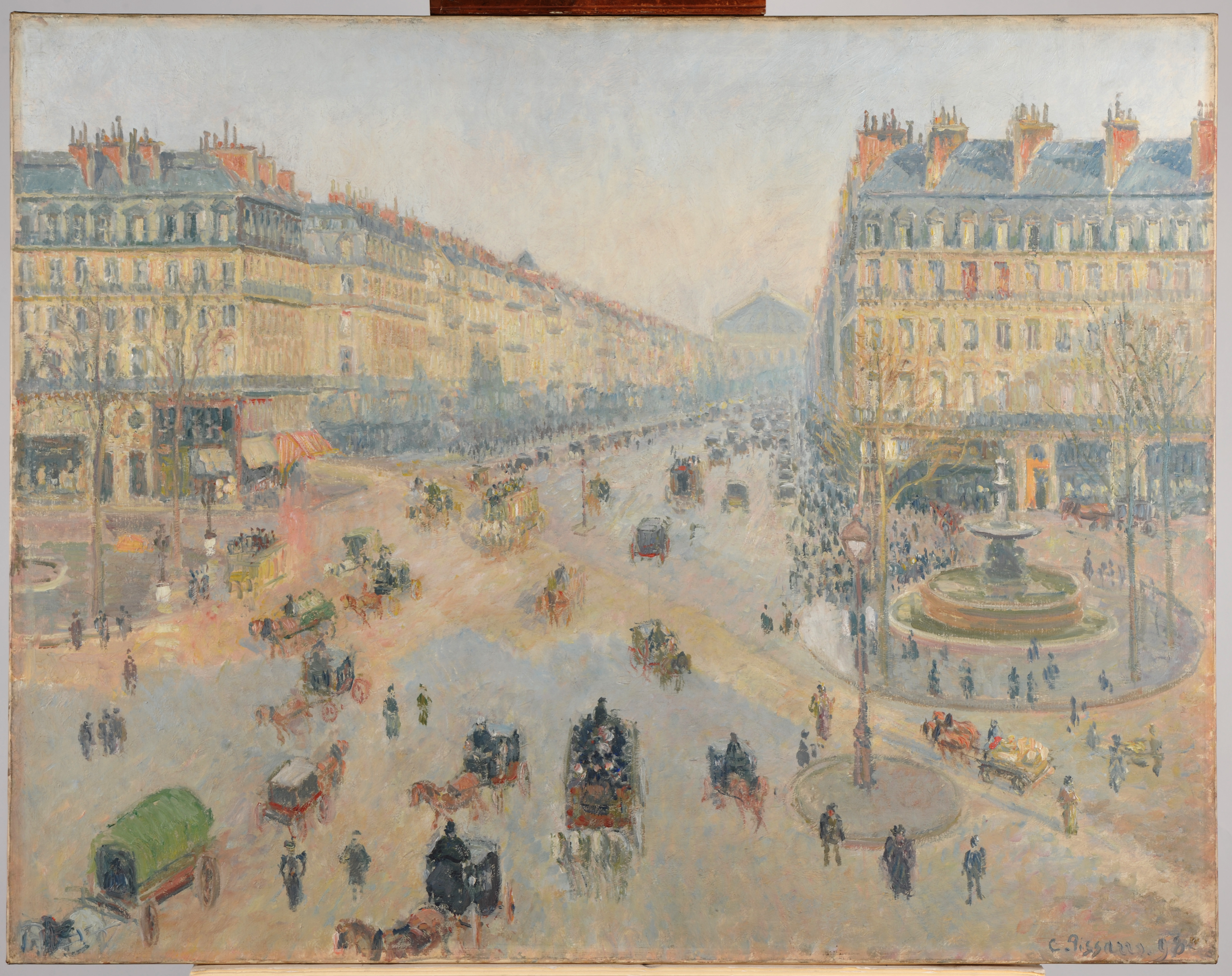
The Avenue de l'Opéra, one of the new boulevards created by Napoleon III and Haussmann. The new buildings on the boulevards were required to have the same height and basic façade design, and all faced with cream-coloured stone, giving central Paris its distinctive harmony.

Napoleon III and Haussmann launched a series of enormous public works projects in Paris, hiring tens of thousands of workers to improve the sanitation, water supply and traffic circulation of the city. Napoleon III installed a huge map of Paris in his office, marked with coloured lines where he wanted new boulevards to be. To a degree the boulevard system was planned as a mechanism for the easy deployment of troops and artillery, but its main purpose was to help relieve traffic congestion in a dense city and interconnect its landmark buildings. He and Haussmann met almost every day to discuss the projects and overcome the enormous obstacles and opposition they faced as they built the new Paris. The transformation also involved architects like Gabriel Davioud who contributed to the design of public and urban spaces.

The population of Paris had doubled since 1815, with no increase in its area. To accommodate the growing population and those who would be forced from the centre by the new boulevards and squares Napoleon III planned to build, he issued a decree annexing eleven surrounding communes, and increasing the number of arrondissements from twelve to twenty, which enlarged the city to its modern boundaries.

For the nearly two decades of Napoleon III's reign, and for a decade afterwards, most of Paris was an enormous construction site. To bring fresh water to the city, his hydraulic engineer, Eugène Belgrand, built a new aqueduct to bring clean water from the Vanne River in Champagne, and a new huge reservoir near the future Parc Montsouris. These two works increased the water supply of Paris from 87,000 to 400,000 cubic metres of water a day.

He laid hundreds of kilometres of pipes to distribute the water throughout the city. He built a second network, using the less-clean water from the Ourq and the Seine, to wash the streets and water the new park and gardens. He completely rebuilt the Paris sewers, and installed miles of pipes to distribute gas for thousands of new streetlights along the Paris streets.

Beginning in 1854, in the centre of the city, Haussmann's workers tore down hundreds of old buildings and cut eighty kilometres of new avenues, connecting the central points of the city. Buildings along these avenues were required to be the same height and in a similar style, and to be faced with cream-coloured stone, creating the uniform look of Paris boulevards. Victor Hugo mentioned that it was hardly possible to distinguish what the house in front of you was for: theatre, shop or library. Haussmann managed to rebuild the city in just 17 years, although some works were completed after him leaving office as prefect. "On his own estimation the new boulevards and open spaces displaced 350,000 people; ... by 1870 one-fifth of the streets in central Paris were his creation; he had spent ... 2.5 billion francs on the city; ... one in five Parisian workers was employed in the building trade".

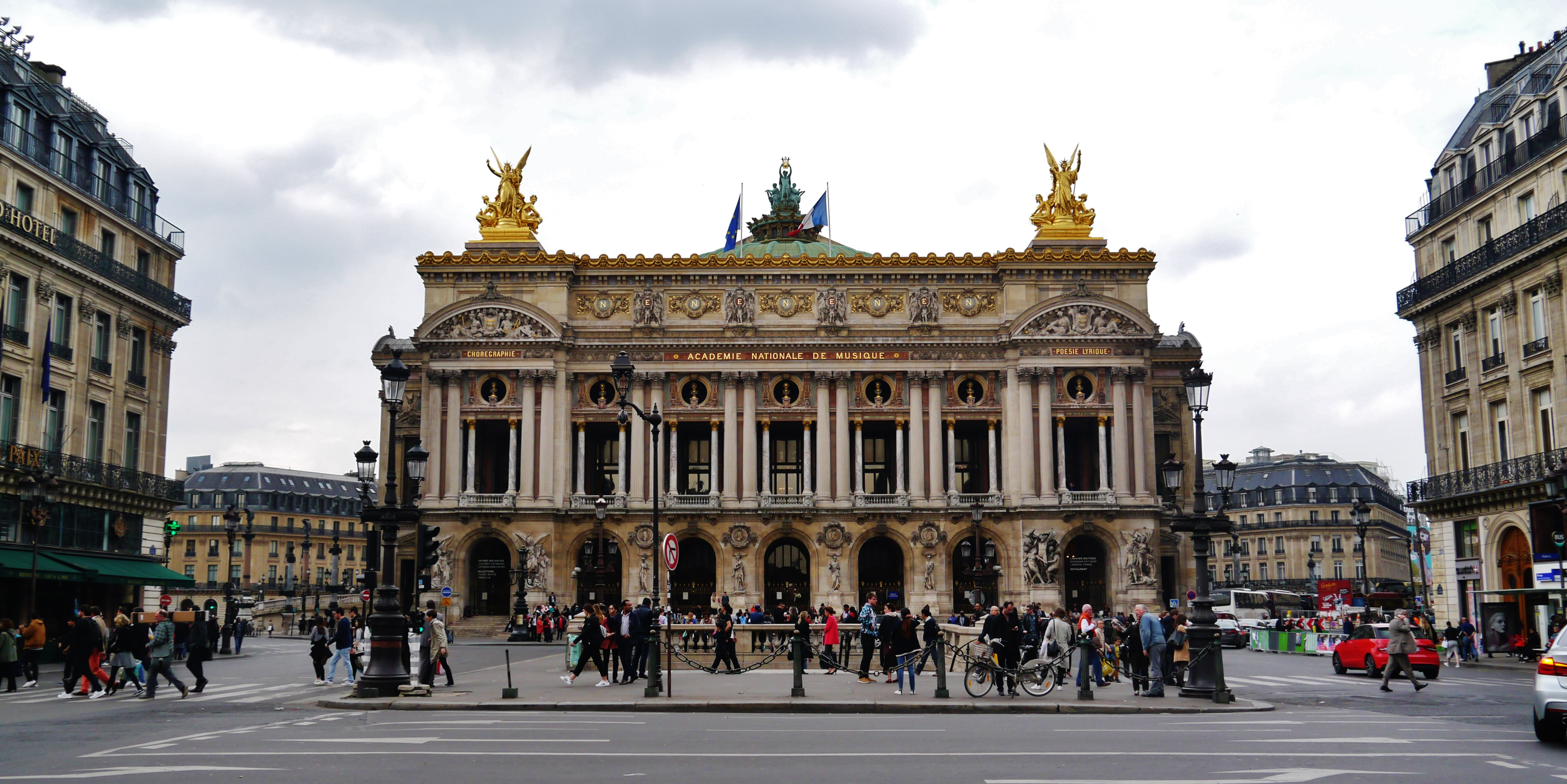
The Paris Opera was the centrepiece of Napoleon III's new Paris. The architect, Charles Garnier, described the style simply as "Napoleon the Third".

To connect the city with the rest of France, Napoleon III built two new railroad stations: the Gare de Lyon (1855) and the Gare du Nord (1864). He completed Les Halles, the great iron and glass produce market in the centre of the city, and built a new municipal hospital, the Hôtel-Dieu, in the place of crumbling medieval buildings on the Île de la Cité. The signature architectural landmark was the Paris Opera, or Palais Garnier, the largest theatre in the world, designed by Charles Garnier (hence its name), crowning the centre of Napoleon III's new Paris, at the end of the newly-designed Avenue de l'Opéra. When the Empress Eugenie saw the model of the opera house, and asked the architect what the style was, Garnier said simply, "Napoleon the Third."

Napoleon III also wanted to build new parks and gardens for the recreation and relaxation of the Parisians, particularly those in the new neighbourhoods of the expanding city.

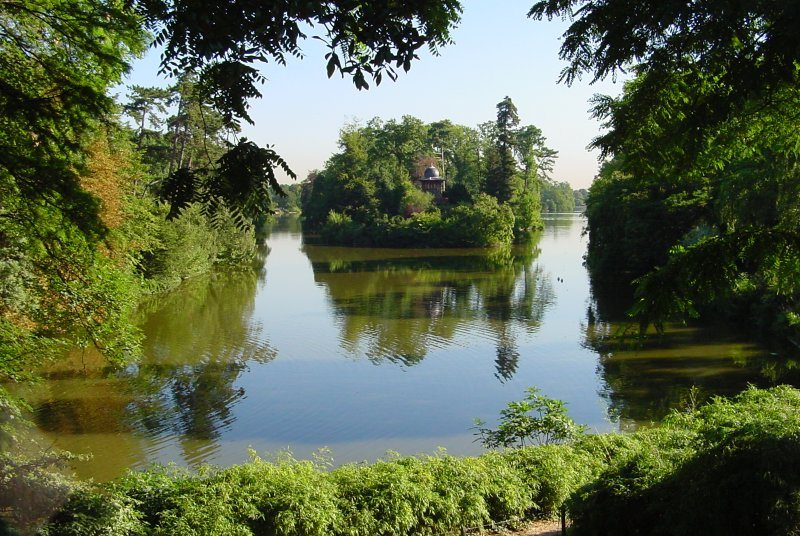
The Bois de Boulogne, built by Napoleon III and Haussmann between 1852 and 1858, was designed to give a place for relaxation and recreation to all the classes of Paris.

Napoleon III's new parks were inspired by his memories of the parks in London, especially Hyde Park, where he had strolled and promenaded in a carriage while in exile, but he wanted to build on a much larger scale. Working with Haussmann and Adolphe Alphand, the engineer who headed the new Service of Promenades and Plantations, he laid out a plan for four major parks at the cardinal points of the compass around the city. Thousands of workers and gardeners began to dig lakes, build cascades, plant lawns, flowerbeds, trees, and construct chalets and grottoes. Napoleon III created the Bois de Boulogne (1852–58) to the west of Paris, the Bois de Vincennes (1860–65) to the east, the Parc des Buttes Chaumont (1865–67) to the north, and Parc Montsouris (1865–78) to the south.

In addition to building the four large parks, Haussmann had the city's older parks, including Parc Monceau, formerly owned by the Orleans family, and the Jardin du Luxembourg, refurbished and replanted. He created twenty small parks and gardens in the neighbourhoods, as miniature versions of his large parks. Alphand termed these small parks "green and flowering salons." The intention of Napoleon's plan was to have one park in each of the eighty neighbourhoods of Paris, so no one was more than 10 minutes walk from a park. The parks were an immediate success with all classes of Parisians.

Haussmann's works resulted in 64 km (39.7 mi) of new streets; France's annual budget was spent on rebuilding the city over the course of just over two decades.

=== Ennoblement ===
To thank Haussmann for his work, Napoleon III proposed in 1857 to make Haussmann a member of the French Senate and to give him an honorary title, as he had done for some of his generals. Haussmann asked for the title of baron, which, as he said in his memoirs, had been the title of his maternal grandfather, Georges Frédéric, Baron Dentzel, a general under Napoleon I, of whom Haussmann was the only living male descendant. According to his memoirs, he joked that he might consider the title aqueduc (a pun on the French words for 'duke' and 'aqueduct') but that no such title existed. This use of baron, however, was not officially sanctioned, and he remained, legally, Monsieur Haussmann.

=== Downfall ===
During the first half of the reign of Napoleon III, the French legislature had little real power. All decisions were made by the Emperor. Beginning in 1860, however, Napoleon decided to liberalise the Empire and give legislators power. The members of the opposition in the parliament increasingly aimed their criticism of Napoleon III at Haussmann, criticising his spending and high-handed attitude toward the parliament.

The cost of the reconstruction projects was also rising rapidly. In December 1858 the Council of State ruled that a property owner whose land was expropriated could retain the land that was not specifically needed for the street, greatly increasing the cost of expropriation. Property owners also became much more clever in claiming higher payments for their buildings, often by creating sham shops and businesses within their buildings. The cost of expropriations jumped from 70 million francs for the first projects to about 230 million francs for the second wave of projects.

In 1858, the Cour des Comptes, which oversaw the finances of the Empire, ruled that the Caisses des Grands Travaux was operating illegally by making "disguised loans" to private companies. The court ruled that such loans had to be approved by the parliament. The parliament was asked to approve a loan of 250 millions francs in 1865, and another 260 million francs in 1869.

Members of the opposition were particularly outraged when in 1866 he took away part of the Luxembourg to make room for the new avenue between the Luxembourg Gardens and the Observatory, and destroyed the old garden nursery which lay between Rue Auguste-Comte, the Rue d'Assas and Avenue de l'Observatoire. When the Emperor and Empress attended a performance at the Odéon Theatre, near the Luxembourg Gardens, members of the audience shouted "Dismiss Haussmann!" and jeered the Emperor. Nonetheless, the Emperor stood by Haussmann.

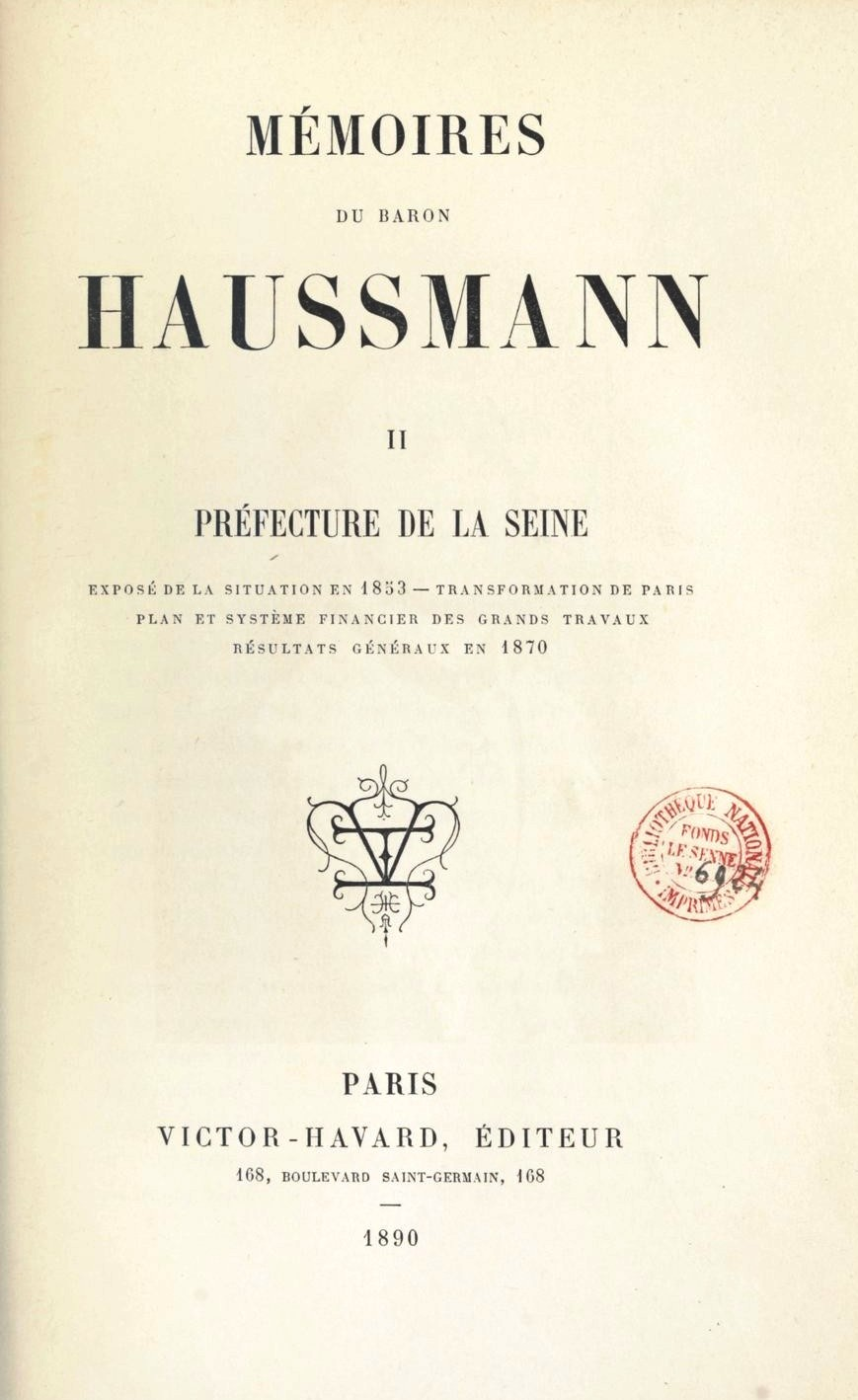
Title page of Memoires by Haussmann, Victor Havard Publisher, 1890.

One of the leaders of the parliamentary opposition to Napoleon, Jules Ferry, ridiculed the accounting practices of Haussmann as Les Comptes fantastiques de Haussmann, or "The fantastic accounts of Haussmann", in 1867, a play on words of "Les Contes Fantastiques de Hoffmann", The Fantastical Tales of Hoffmann. The republican opposition to Napoleon III won many parliamentary seats in the 1869 elections, and increased its criticism of Haussmann.

Napoleon III gave in to the criticism and named an opposition leader and fierce critic of Haussmann, Émile Ollivier, as his new prime minister. Haussmann was invited to resign. Haussmann refused to resign, and was relieved of his duties by the Emperor. Six months later, during the Franco-German War, Napoleon III was captured by the Germans, and the Empire was overthrown.

In his memoires, Haussmann had this comment on his dismissal: "In the eyes of the Parisians, who like routine in things but are changeable when it comes to people, I committed two great wrongs; over the course of seventeen years I disturbed their daily habits by turning Paris upside down, and they had to look at the same face of the Prefect in the Hôtel de Ville. These were two unforgivable complaints."

After the fall of Napoleon III, Haussmann spent about a year abroad, but he re-entered public life in 1877, when he became Bonapartist deputy for Ajaccio. His later years were occupied with the preparation of his Mémoires (three volumes, 1890–1893).

=== Death ===
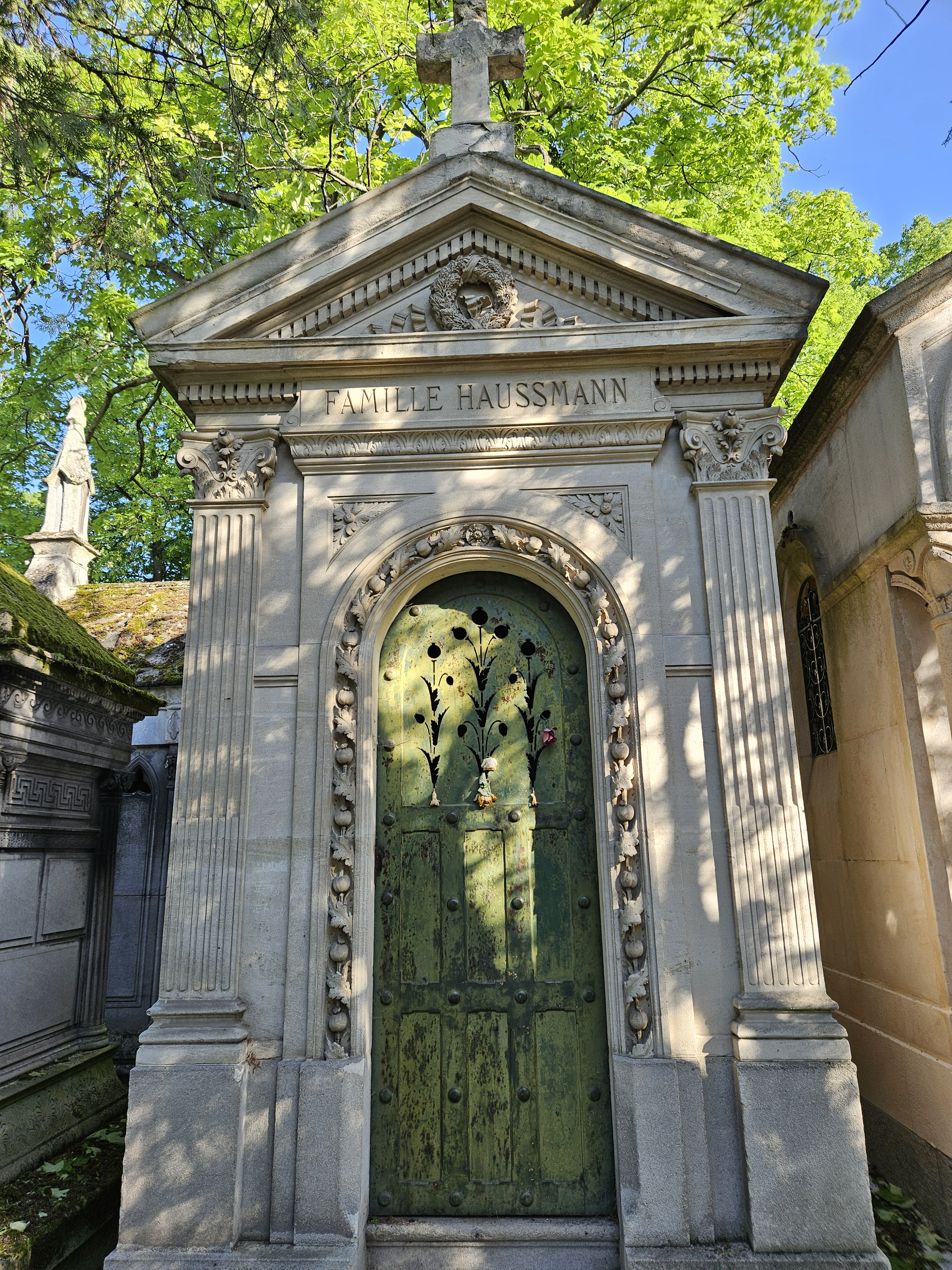
Tomb of Georges-Eugène Haussmann at Père Lachaise Cemetry

Haussmann died in Paris on 11 January 1891 at age 81 and was buried in Père Lachaise Cemetery. His wife, Louise-Octavie de la Harpe, had died just eighteen days earlier. At the time of their deaths, they had resided in an apartment at 12 Rue Boissy d'Anglas, near the Place de la Concorde. The will transferred their estate to the family of their only surviving daughter, Valentine Haussmann.

== Legacy ==
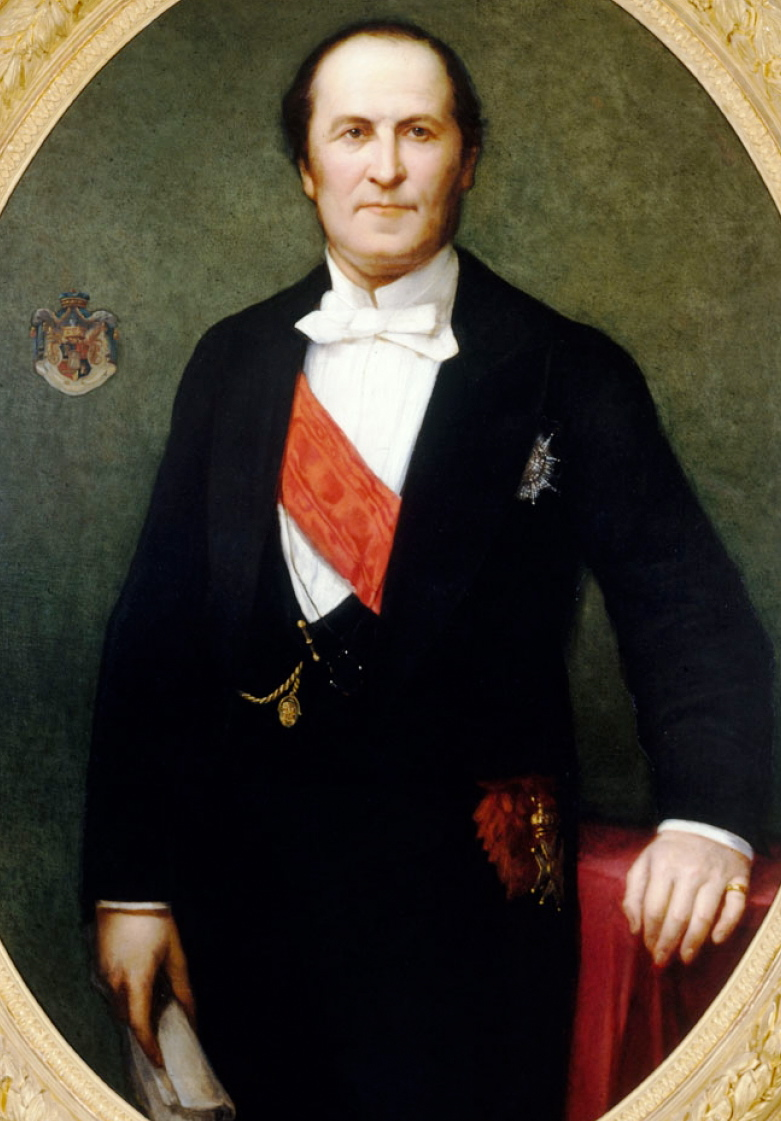
Portrait of Baron Haussmann, by Henri Lehmann, 1860, Musée Carnavalet

Haussmann's plan for Paris inspired the urban planning and creation of similar boulevards, squares and parks in Cairo, Buenos Aires, Brussels, Rome, Vienna, Stockholm, Madrid, and Barcelona. After the Paris International Exposition of 1867, William I, the King of Prussia, carried back to Berlin a large map showing Haussmann's projects, which influenced the future planning of that city.

His work also inspired the City Beautiful Movement in the United States. Frederick Law Olmsted, the designer of Central Park in New York, visited the Bois de Boulogne eight times during his 1859 study trip to Europe, and was also influenced by the innovations of the Parc des Buttes Chaumont. The American architect Daniel Burnham borrowed liberally from Haussmann's plan and incorporated the diagonal street designs in his 1909 Plan of Chicago.

Haussmann had been made senator in 1857, member of the Academy of Fine Arts in 1867, and grand cross of the Legion of Honour in 1862. His name is preserved in the Boulevard Haussmann.

== Controversies ==
=== Financing the reconstruction of Paris ===
The reconstruction of the centre of Paris was the largest such public works project ever undertaken in Europe. Never before had a major city been completely rebuilt when it was still intact. London, Rome, Copenhagen and Lisbon had been rebuilt after major fires or earthquakes. Napoleon III began his grand projects when he was prince-president, when the government had a full treasury. In his 1851 plan, he proposed to extend the Rue de Rivoli to connect the Louvre with the Hôtel de Ville, to build a wide new avenue, the Boulevard de Strasbourg on a north-south axis, and to complete the central produce market, Les Halles, long unfinished.

He approached the Parliament and received authorisation to borrow fifty million francs. The Emperor's ambitions were much greater. He wanted to finish the building of the Louvre and to create an enormous new park, the Bois de Boulogne, to the west of Paris. His prefect of Seine, Berger, protested that Paris did not have the money. At this point, Napoleon dismissed Berger and hired Haussmann, and Haussmann looked for a better way to finance his projects.

Napoleon III was especially anxious to finish the extension of the Rue de Rivoli from the Louvre to the Hôtel de Ville, before the opening of the Paris Universal Exposition of 1855. Napoleon III demanded the construction of a new luxury hotel, to house his imperial guests during the Exposition. Napoleon III and Haussmann turned for funding to two Parisian bankers, the Pereire brothers, who had created a bank called Crédit Mobilier.

In December 1854, with no time to lose before the opening of the exposition, the Pereire brothers created a new company to construct the street and the hotel. They sold 240,000 shares for one hundred francs each, with 106,665 shares purchased by Crédit Mobilier, 42,220 by the Pereire brothers, and the rest to private investors. In 1850 and 1851, at Napoleon's request, new laws were passed making it easier for Paris to expropriate private land for public purposes. They allowed the city to expropriate, in the public interest, land for new streets, and all of the building sites on both sides of the new streets, an asset of enormous value.

The government expropriated the land, with buildings, that it needed to build the new street and hotel. The owners were paid a price set by an arbitration board. The government then sold the land and buildings to the company established by the Pereire brothers, which tore down the old buildings and constructed a new street, sidewalks and a new square, the Place du Palais-Royal. They built new buildings along the new street, and sold them or rented them to new owners.

They constructed the Hotel du Louvre, one of the largest buildings in the city and one of the first modern luxury hotels in Paris. The company also built rows of luxury shops under a covered arcade along the Rue de Rivoli and around the hotel, which they rented to shopkeepers. Construction began immediately. Three thousand workers laboured both day and night for two years to complete the street and hotel, which were finished in time for the Exposition.

This was the basic method adopted by Haussmann to finance the reconstruction of Paris. The government expropriated the old buildings and compensated the owners, and private companies built the new streets and buildings, following the standards set by Haussmann. The private companies were often paid for the construction work they did, with city land, which they could then develop and sell.

In 1854, the Parliament approved another loan of sixty million francs, but Haussmann needed far more for his future projects. On 14 November 1858, Napoleon and Haussmann created the Caisse des travaux de la Ville, specifically to finance the reconstruction projects. It borrowed money at a higher rate of interest than regular city bonds, and used the money to pay private companies, such as that of Pereire brothers, to rebuild the city. "It was a great relief for the city's finances," Haussmann wrote later in his Memoirs "which allowed the city to carry out several grand operations at the same time, with rapid execution, in short more economically." It functioned entirely independently of the parliament, which greatly irritated the members of parliament.

=== Criticism of the renovation ===
Haussmann spent 2.5 billion francs on rebuilding Paris, a sum that staggered his critics. Jules Ferry and other political rivals of Napoleon alleged that Haussmann had recklessly squandered money, and planned poorly. They alleged he had falsified accounts. While Napoleon had hired Haussmann, the political attacks were so intense that he forced Haussmann to become a scapegoat, hoping his resignation would satisfy the bourgeois parties which had become increasingly angered during the economic depression of the late 1860s.

Haussmann's plans, with their radical redevelopment, coincided with a time of intense political activity in Paris. Many Parisians were troubled by the destruction of "old roots". Historian Robert Herbert says that "the impressionist movement depicted this loss of connection in such paintings as Manet's A Bar at the Folies-Bergère." The subject of the painting is talking to a man, seen in the mirror behind her, but seems disengaged. According to Herbert, this is a symptom of living in Paris at this time: the citizens became detached from one another. "The continuous destruction of physical Paris led to a destruction of social Paris as well." The poet Charles Baudelaire witnessed these changes and wrote the poem "The Swan" in response. The poem is a lament for, and critique of the destruction of the medieval city in the name of "progress":

Old Paris is gone (no human heart

changes half so fast as a city's face) ...
There used to be a poultry market here,
and one cold morning ... I saw

a swan that had broken out of its cage,
webbed feet clumsy on the cobblestones,
white feathers dragging through uneven ruts,
and obstinately pecking at the drains ...

Paris changes ... but in sadness like mine
nothing stirs—new buildings, old
neighbourhoods turn to allegory,

and memories weigh more than stone.

Haussmann was also criticized for the great cost of his project. Napoleon III deposed Haussmann on 5 January 1870 in order to improve his own flagging popularity. Haussmann was a favourite target of the Situationists' critique. Besides pointing out the repressive aims that were achieved by Haussmann's urbanism, Guy Debord and his friends, who considered urbanism to be a "state science" or inherently "capitalist" science, also underlined that he nicely separated leisure areas from work places, thus announcing modern functionalism, as illustrated by Le Corbusier's precise zone tripartition, with one zone for circulation, one for housing, and one for labour.

Some of the contemporary critics of Haussmann softened their views over time. Jules Simon was an ardent republican who had refused to take an oath to Napoleon III, and had been a fierce critic of Haussmann in parliament but in 1882, he wrote of Haussmann in the Gaulois:

"He tried to make Paris a magnificent city, and he succeeded completely. When he took Paris in hand and managed our affairs, rue Saint-Honore and rue Saint-Antoine were still the largest streets in the city. We had no other promenades than the Grands Boulevards and the Tuileries; the Champs-Élysées was most of the time a sewer; the Bois-de-Boulogne was at the end of the world. We were lacking water, markets, light, in those far-off times, which are only thirty years past. He demolished neighbourhoods- one could say, entire cities. They cried that he would create a plague; he let us cry and, on the contrary, through his intelligent piercing of streets, he gave us air, health and life. Here he created a street; there he created an avenue or a boulevard; here a Place, a Square; a Promenade. Out of emptiness he made the Champs-Élysées, the Bois de Boulogne, the Bois de Vincennes. He introduced, into his beautiful capital, trees and flowers, and populated it with statues."

=== The debate about the military function of Haussmann's boulevards ===
Some critics and historians in the 20th century, notably Lewis Mumford, argued that the real purpose of Haussmann's boulevards was to make it easier for the army to crush popular uprisings. According to these critics, the wide boulevards gave the army greater mobility, a wider range of fire for their cannon, and made it harder to block streets with barricades. They argued that the boulevards built by Haussmann allowed the French army to easily suppress the Paris Commune in 1871.

Other historians disputed this argument. They noted that while Haussmann sometimes mentioned the military advantages of the boulevards when seeking funding for his projects, it was never the main purpose. Their main purpose, according to Napoleon III and Haussmann, was to improve traffic circulation, provide space and light and views of the city landmarks, and to beautify Paris.

Haussmann did not deny the military value of the wider streets. In his Memoires, he wrote that his new boulevard Sebastopol resulted in the "gutting of old Paris, of the quarter of riots and barricades." He admitted he sometimes used this argument with the parliament to justify the high cost of his projects, arguing that they were for national defense and should be paid for, at least partially, by the state. He wrote: "But, as for me, I who was the promoter of these additions made to original project, I declare that I never thought in the least, in adding them, of their greater or lesser strategic value."

The Paris urban historian Patrice de Moncan wrote: "To see the works created by Haussmann and Napoleon III only from the perspective of their strategic value is very reductive. The Emperor was a convinced follower of Saint-Simon. His desire to make Paris, the economic capital of France, a more open, more healthy city, not only for the upper classes but also for the workers, cannot be denied, and should be recognised as the primary motivation."

During the suppression of the Paris Commune in 1871, the newly built-boulevards were not a major factor in the Commune's defeat. The Communards were defeated in one week, not because of Haussmann's boulevards, but because they were outnumbered by five to one. They had fewer weapons and fewer men trained to use them, they had no plan for the defense of the city. They had very few experienced officers and there was no single commander, with each neighborhood left to defend itself, and they had no hope of military support from outside of Paris.

== See also ==
- David Harvey, Paris Capital of Modernity, especially the introduction and prologue.
- Gabriel Davioud, worked closely with Haussmann on the renovation of Paris
- Hobrecht-Plan of Berlin, another large-scale urban planning approach conducted by James Hobrecht, created in 1853.
- Ildefons Cerdà who designed the 19th-century extension of Barcelona called the Eixample neighborhoods
- List of urban planners
- Paris during the Second Empire
- Robert Moses, New York planner with whom Haussmann is occasionally compared.
- Second Empire style, also known as Napoleon III style
- Walter Benjamin's Arcades Project
