= Antonin Proust =

French journalist and politician (1832–1905)

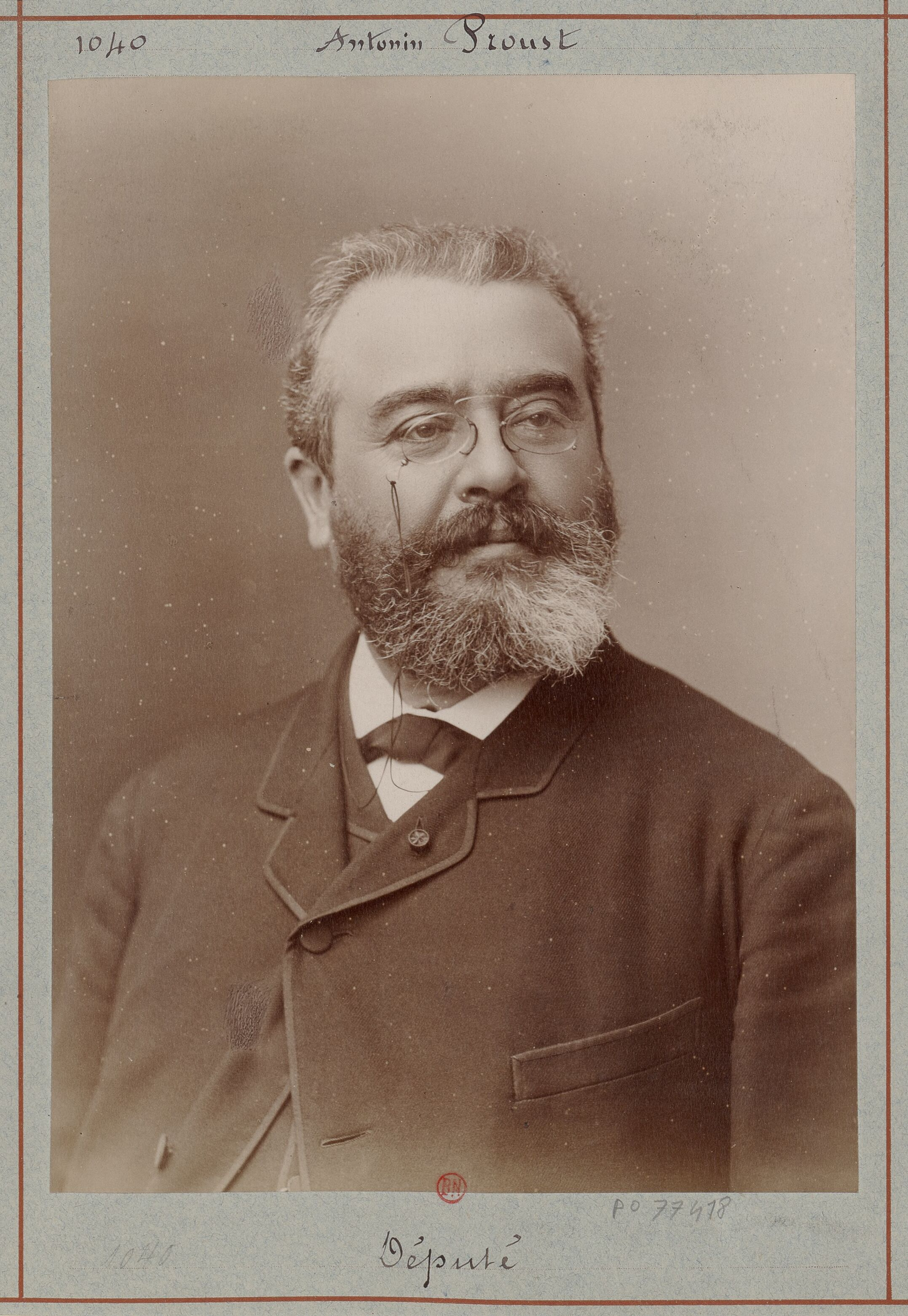
Antonin Proust

Antonin Proust (15 March 1832 – 20 March 1905) was a French journalist and politician.

Antonin Proust was born at Niort, Deux-Sèvres. In the 1840s, Proust attended the Collège Rollin where he met lifelong friend Édouard Manet. In September 1850, Proust and Manet joined the studio of Thomas Couture for artistic training. In 1864, Proust founded an anti-imperial journal, La Semaine hebdomadaire which appeared in Brussels. He was war correspondent for Le Temps in the early days of the Franco-Prussian War, but after the Battle of Sedan (1870) he returned to Paris, where he became secretary to Léon Gambetta and superintended the refugees in Paris.

He entered the Chamber of Deputies as representative for his native town in 1876, taking his seat on the left. In Gambetta's cabinet (1881–1882) he was minister of the fine arts, and in the Chamber of Deputies] he was regularly commissioned to draw up the budget for the fine arts, after the separate department had ceased to exist. Prosecuted in connection with the Panama scandals, he was acquitted in 1893. From this time he lived in the closest retirement. On 20 March 1905 he shot himself in the head, dying of the wound two days later.

He was not related to Marcel Proust, the famous writer.

== Gallery ==
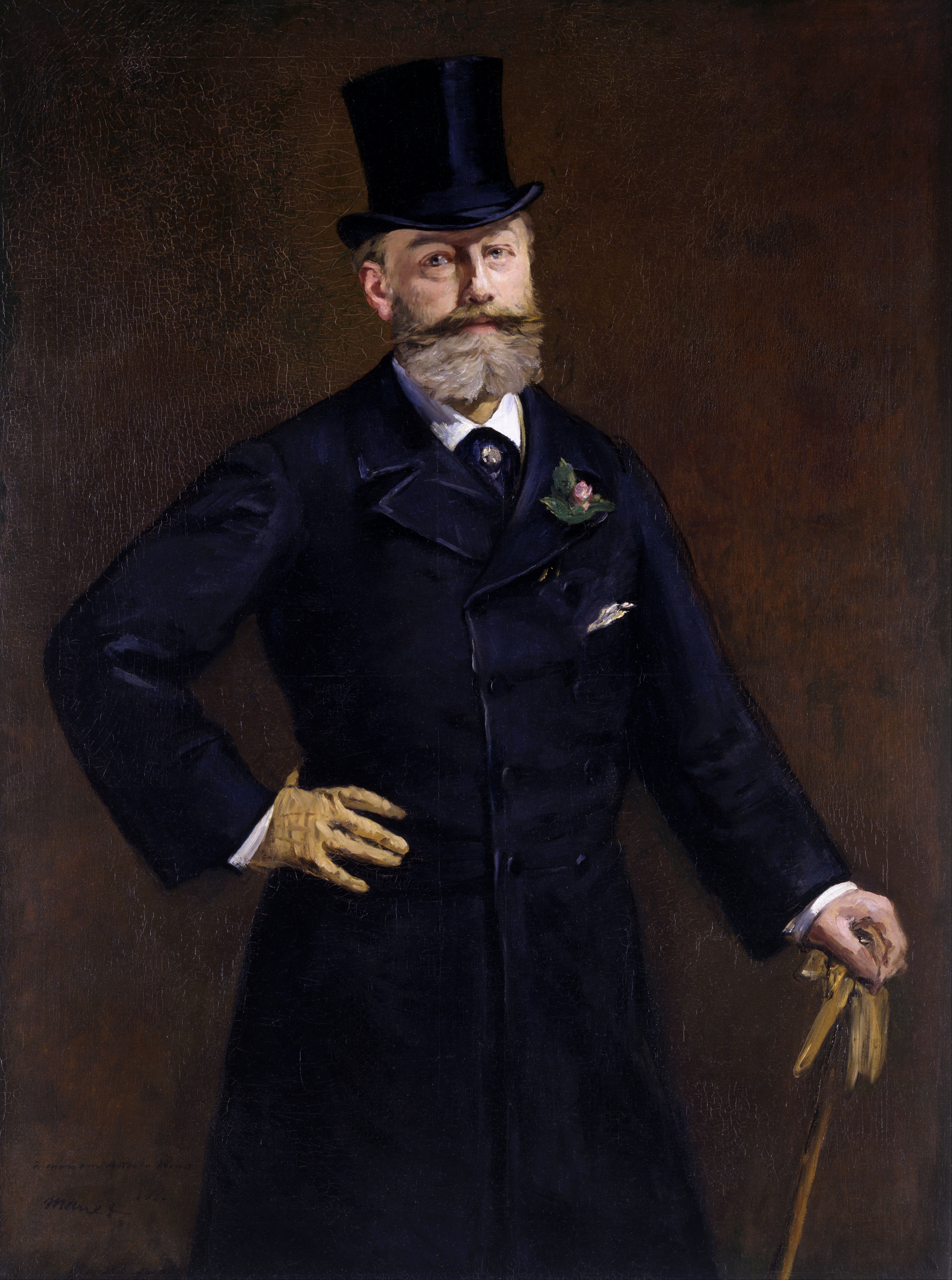
Portrait by Édouard Manet, 1880

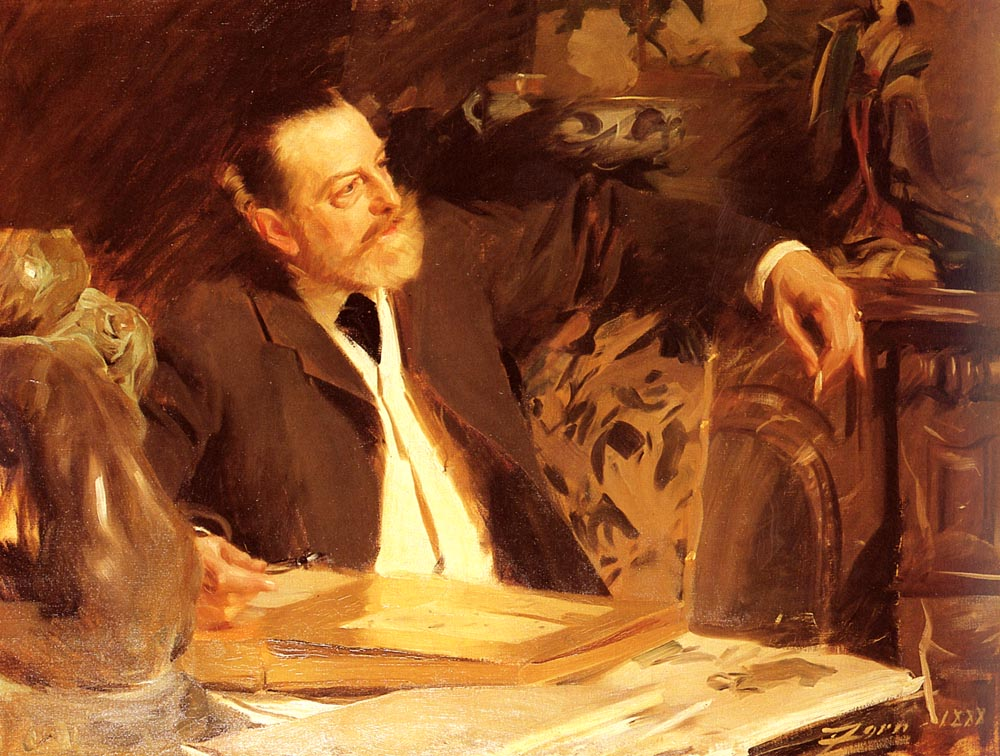
Portrait by Anders Zorn, 1888

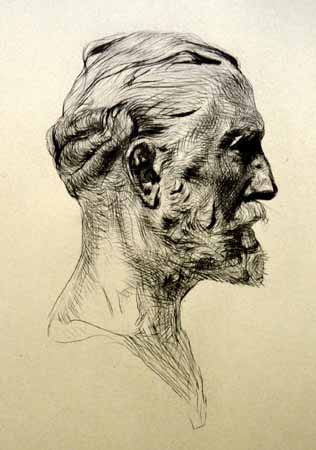
Portrait by Auguste Rodin, 1897
