= Emmanuel Arago =

French politician (1812–1896)

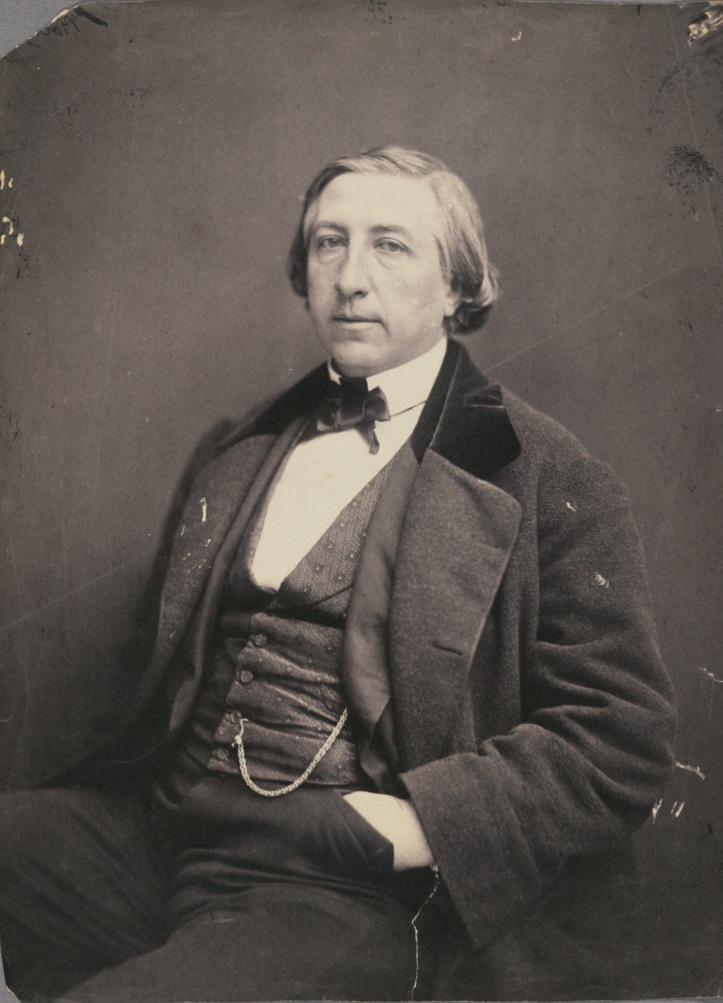

Emmanuel Arago (6 August 1812, Paris – 26 November 1896, Paris) was a French politician of the French Second Republic, Second French Empire and French Third Republic. He was the son of François Arago. He was a member of the 1848 Constituent Assembly and the National Assembly of 1871. He was a deputy for Pyrénées-Orientales (1848–1851, 1871–1876) and la Seine (1869–1870) and senator for Pyrénées-Orientales (1876–1896). He served as minister of the interior and minister of justice in the Government of France. While a senator, he also served as ambassador of France to Switzerland from 1880 to 1894.

| Preceded by Léon Gambetta | Minister of the Interior of France; 6–19 February 1871 | Succeeded by Ernest Picard |
