= Léonie Yahne =

French actress

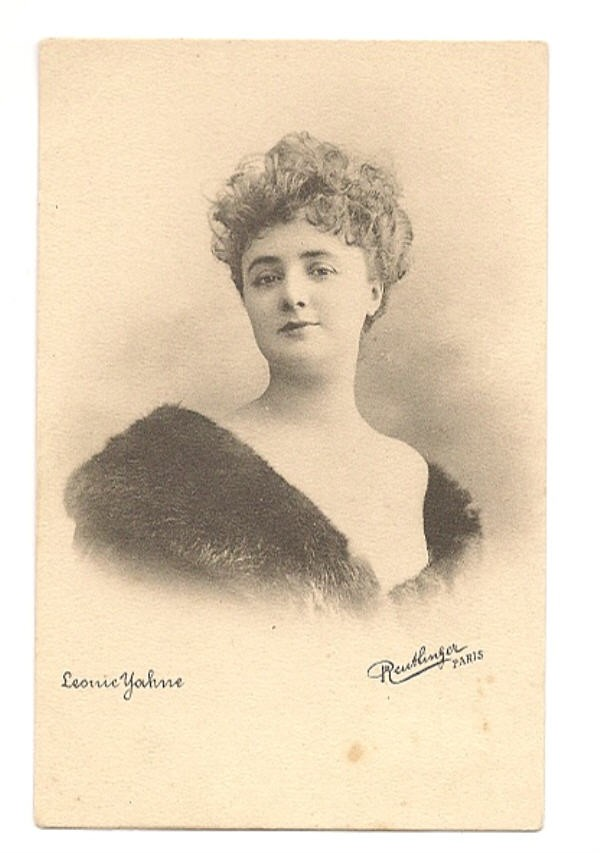
- Leonie Yahne in about 1900, by Reutlinger
- Born: Marie Léonie Jahn; August 8, 1867; Versailles, France
- Died: April 26, 1950 (aged 82); Paris, France
- Occupation: Actress
- Years active: 1884–1917
- Known for: La Reine Fiammette

Léonie Yahne (August 8, 1867 – April 26, 1950) was a French comedic actress.

== Early life ==
Marie Léonie Jahn was born at Versailles, France. She used a different spelling of her surname professionally, to reflect its pronunciation.

== Career ==
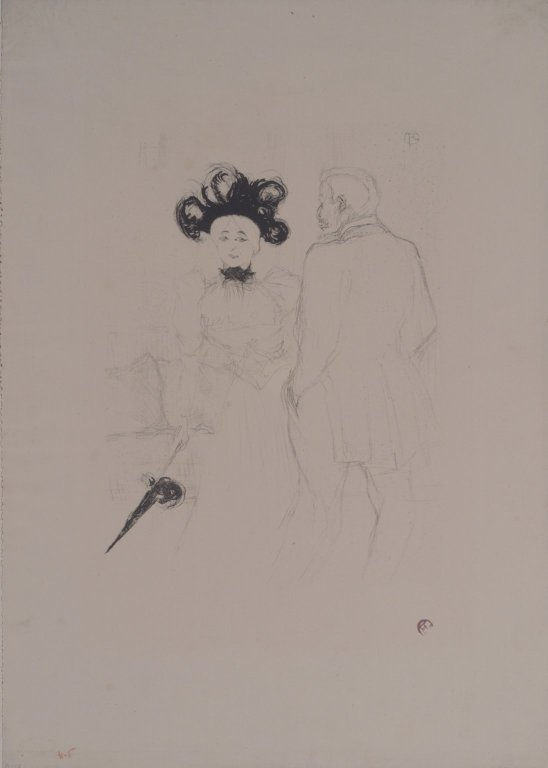
"Yahne et Antoine dans l'age difficile", by Henri de Toulouse-Lautrec, in the collection of the Brooklyn Museum

Yahne was an actress on the Paris stage for most of her career, which lasted from about 1884 to 1917. Her stage roles included Lucienne in Monsieur l'Abbé (1891), Roxane in Cyrano de Bergerac (1900), opposite Benoît-Constant Coquelin, the title part in Catulle Mendès's La Reine Fiammette (1898), Huguette in Famille (1901). and Adinolfa in Impressions d'Afrique (1912). In 1895, Henri de Toulouse-Lautrec drew her with her co-stars André Antoine and Henry Mayer in L'Age Difficile. She also appeared in at least one silent film short, Le duel de Max (1913) with Max Linder.

In 1911 she won a lawsuit against another Parisian actress calling herself "Yane", preventing the other woman from using a stage name that so closely resembled her own. An English magazine referred to Yahne as "a favourite in society, an expert with foils, a passionate horsewoman, and a terror of France on her automobile."

== Personal life ==
Léonie Yahne owned a property in Louveciennes, named Villa Fiammette after one of her best-known roles. She died in Paris in 1950, aged 82 years.
