= Henri Chevreau =

French politician (1823–1903)

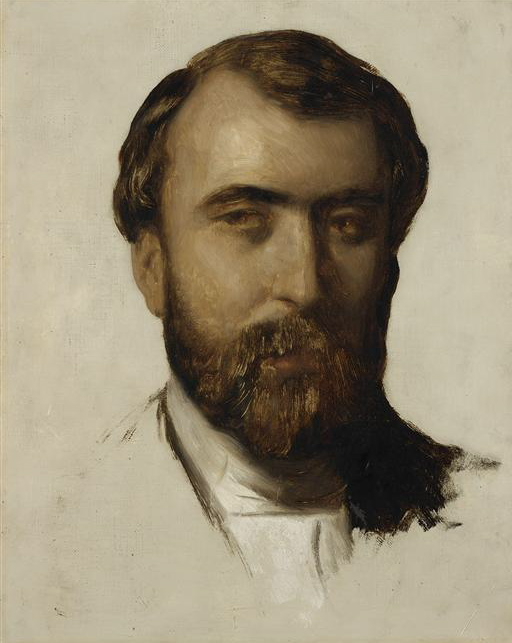

Henri Chevreau (27 April 1823, Paris – 26 May 1903) was a French Bonapartist politician of the Second French Empire and French Third Republic. He was a grand officer of the Legion of Honour. He served as minister of the interior in the Government of France.

== Sources ==
- « Chevreau (Julien-Théophile-Henri) », dans Pierre Larousse, Grand dictionnaire universel du XIXe siècle, 15 vol., 1863-1890
- "Henri Chevreau", in Adolphe Robert and Gaston Cougny, Dictionnaire des parlementaires français (1789–1891), Bourloton, Paris, 1889 Edition details Wikisource
- "Notice no. LH/525/74". Base Léonore (in French).
