= Léonie Léon =

French mistress of Léon Gambetta

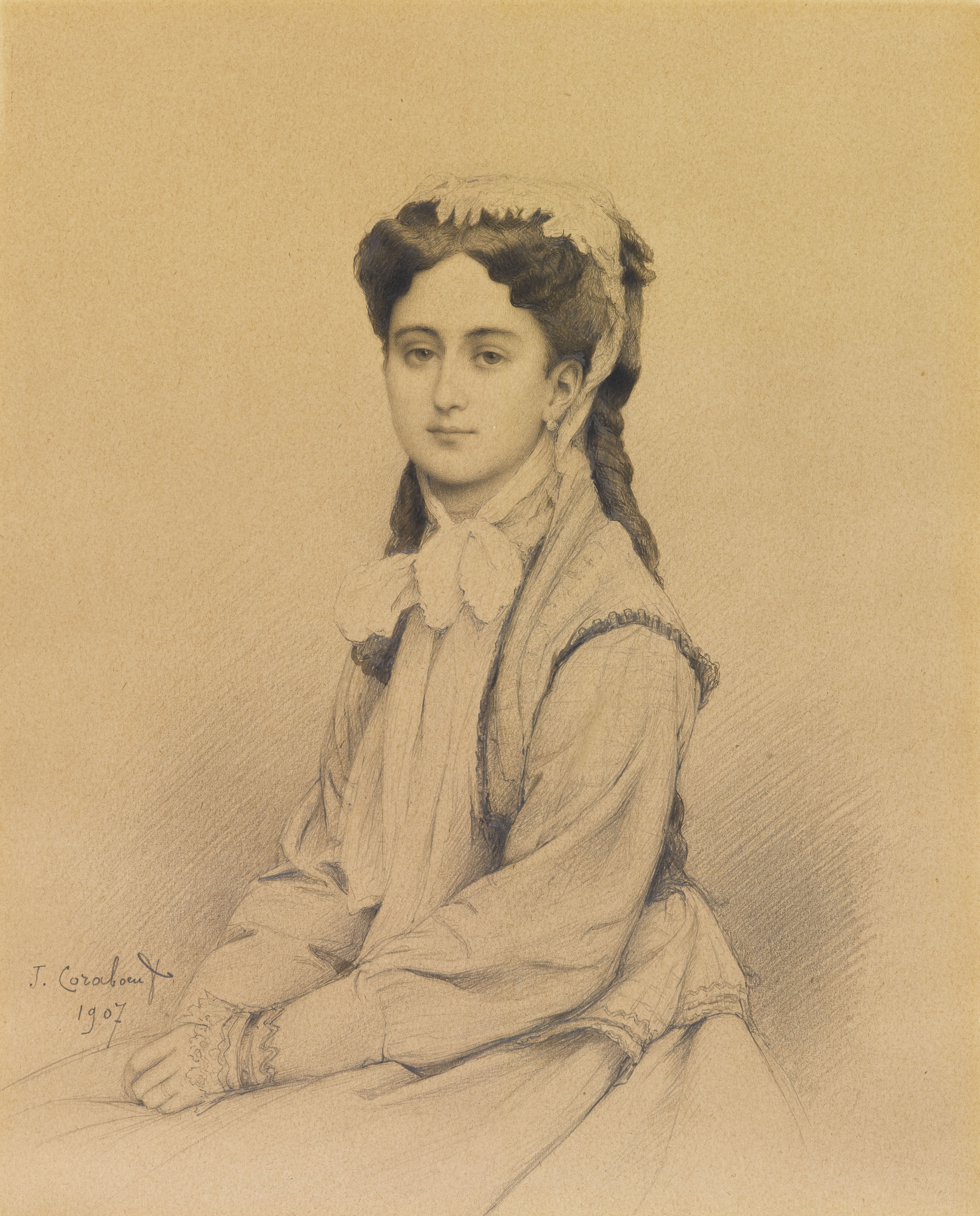
- Léonie Léon (1875) by Jean Corabœuf
- Born: Marie-Léonie Léon; November 6, 1838; Paris, France
- Died: November 14, 1906 (aged 68); Paris, France
- Occupation: Courtesan
- Known for: mistress of Léon Gambetta

Léonie Léon (6 November 1838, Paris – 14 November 1906 Paris) was a French courtesan, best known for being the mistress of statesman Léon Gambetta.

== Biography ==
Born Marie-Léonie Léon in Paris on 6 November 1838, she was the daughter of a French artillery officer. She was educated at the Louvencourt Sisters convent school in Dunkirk. Following the death of her father in the Charenton asylum in 1860, Léon took Louis-Alphonse Hyrvoix, who was in charge of Emperor Napoleon III's security, as a lover. She gave birth to Alphonse Léon, Hyrvoix's son, in Bordeaux on 5 February 1865. Léon and Hyrvoix were lovers for eight years.

== Léon Gambetta ==
Léon met Gambetta in 1868 and was his mistress from 1872 until his death a decade later. She lived in a house on Avenue Perrichont in Auteuil and was his confidante and adviser in his political plans. They corresponded on an almost daily basis and Gambetta repeatedly urged her to marry him. She finally consented in 1882. The couple had arranged to marry in December 1882. Shortly before the wedding day Gambetta accidentally shot himself in the hand while cleaning his gun. The wound refused to heal and he died of complications caused by the wound on 31 December. As the couple had agreed to keep their relationship away from the public eye, Léon did not attend his funeral. She did mourn him privately and continued to mourn until her death in 1906. It was only after her death that the full details of their relationship became known to the public.

Around 1920 rumours circulated that Léon had been a German spy.

Léon and Gambetta exchanged 6,000 letters between 1872 and Gambetta's death in 1882. Around 1,100 of these are still in existence.
