= Louis-Jules Trochu =

French head of state

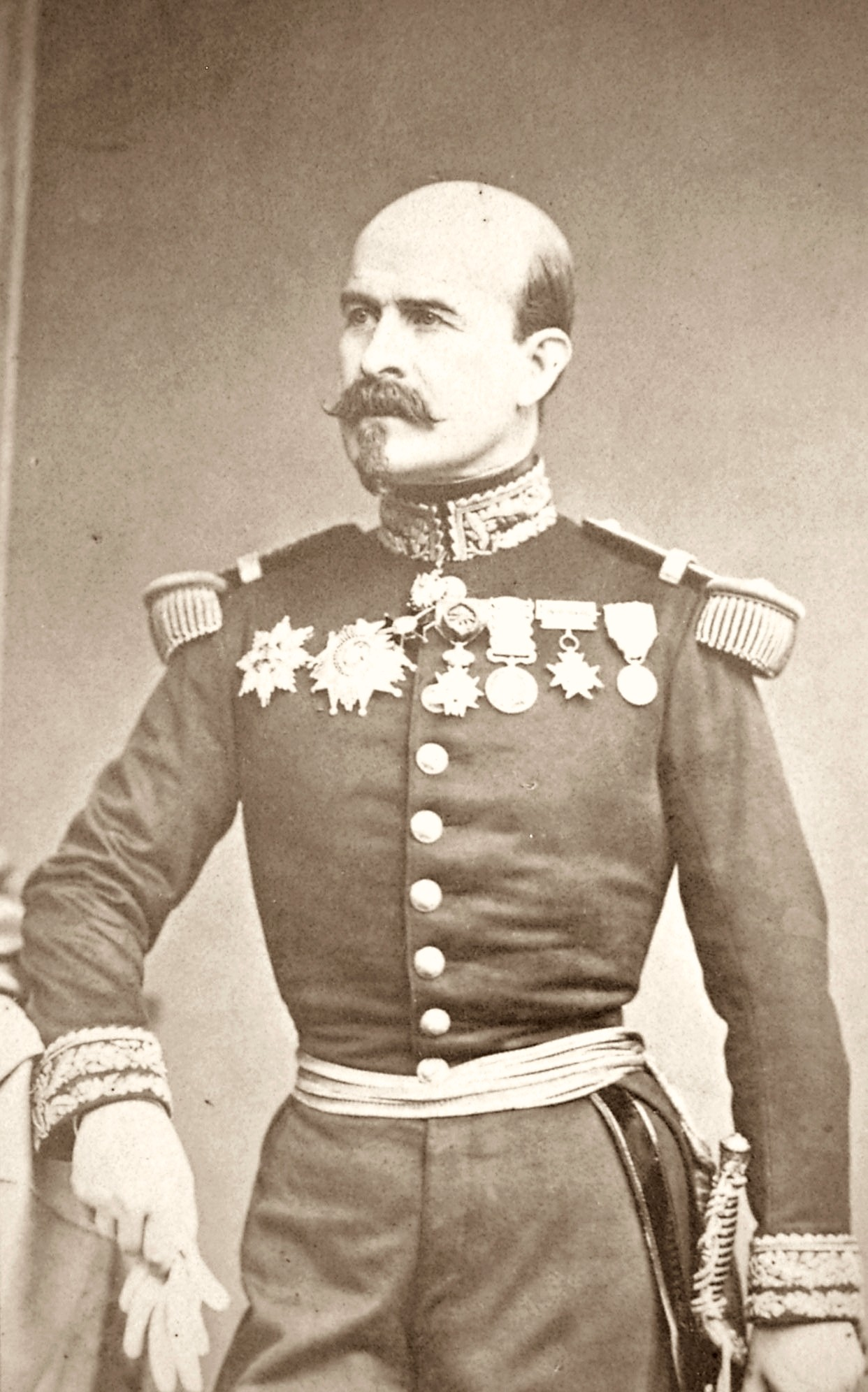
- Louis-Jules Trochu

Interim French Head of State Prime Minister of France
- In office 4 September 1870 – 13 February 1871
- Preceded by: Emperor Napoleon III (Head of State); Charles Cousin-Montauban (Prime Minister)
- Succeeded by: Adolphe Thiers (President of France); Jules Dufaure (Chief of Government)

Personal details
- Born: 12 March 1815 Le Palais, France
- Died: 7 October 1896 (aged 81) Tours, France
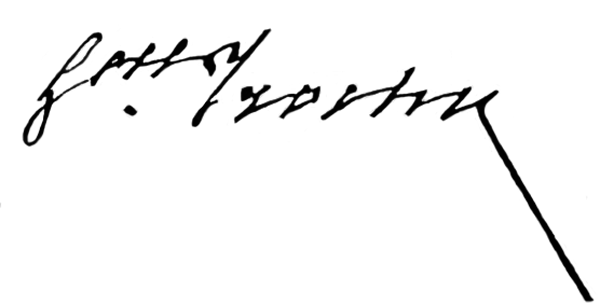
- Signature

Louis-Jules Trochu (French: [lwi ʒyl tʁɔʃy]; 12 March 1815 – 7 October 1896) was a French military leader and politician. He served as President of the Government of National Defense—France's de facto head of state—from 4 September 1870 until his resignation on 22 January 1871 (although he retained the role symbolically until the legislative elections of February 1871).

== Military career ==
Oriental Army of the Crimean campaign by Gustav Bartsch. From left to right: Admiral Ferdinand-Alphonse Hamelin, Lord Lucan, Lord Raglan, Admiral Dundas, Sir John Campbell, Duke of Cambridge, Lord Cardigan, Ismail Pasha, Omer Pasha, Muhlis Pasha (Grigore Sturdza), Sultan Abdülmecid I, Said-Bey (Vasile Obedeanu), Ahmed Pasha, col. Desmaret, Marshal Baraguey d'Hilliers, Prince Napoleon, col. Trochu, Marshal de Saint-Arnaud, general Bosquet, general de Canrobert

Trochu was born at Le Palais on the island of Belle-Île-en-Mer, off the coast of Brittany. Educated at St. Cyr, he received a commission in the Staff Corps in 1837, and was promoted to lieutenant in 1840, and captain in 1843. He served as a captain in Algeria under Marshal Bugeaud, who, in recognition of his gallantry in the battles of Sidi Yussuf and Isly, made him his aide-de-camp and entrusted him with important commissions. He was promoted to major in 1845, and to colonel in 1853. He served with distinction throughout the Crimean campaign, first as aide-de-camp to Marshal St. Arnaud, and then as general of brigade, and was made a commander of the Légion d'honneur and general of division. He again distinguished himself in command of a division in the Italian campaign of 1859, where he won the Grand Cross of the Légion d'honneur.

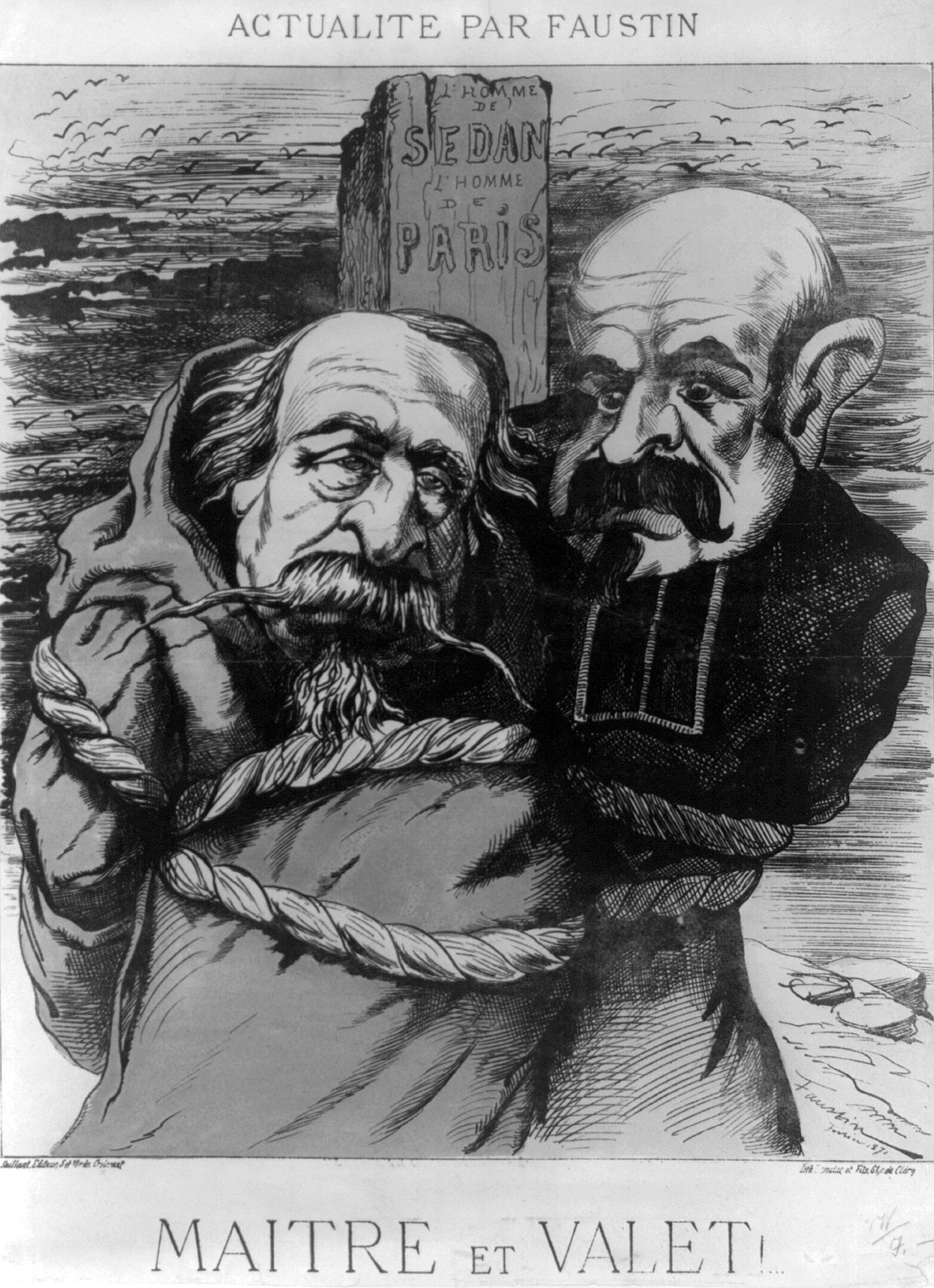
1871 caricature showing Napoleon III dressed as a monk and Louis Jules Trochu dressed as a member of the clergy, tied to a post labeled "L'homme de Sedan. L'homme de Paris." Both men were held responsible for the French defeat which ended the Franco-Prussian War.

In 1866, Trochu was employed at the ministry of war in the preparation of army reorganization schemes, and he published anonymously in the following year L'Armée française en 1867, a work inspired with Orleanist sentiment, which ran through ten editions in a few months and reached a twentieth in 1870. This brochure brought him into bad odour at court, and he left the war office on half-pay and was refused a command in the field at the outbreak of the Franco-Prussian War. After the earlier disasters in 1870, he was appointed by the emperor first commandant of the troops of Châlons camp, and soon afterwards (17 August) governor of Paris and commander-in-chief of all the forces destined for the defence of the capital, including some 120,000 regular troops, 80,000 mobiles, and 330,000 National Guards.

Trochu worked energetically to put Paris in a state of defence and throughout the Siege of Paris showed himself a master of the passive defensive. At the revolution of 4 September he became president of the Government of National Defence, in addition to his other offices. His "plan" for defending the city raised expectations doomed to disappointment; the successive sorties made under pressure of public opinion were unsuccessful, and having declared in one of his proclamations that the governor of Paris would never capitulate, when capitulation became inevitable he resigned the governorship of Paris on 22 January 1871 to General Joseph Vinoy, retaining the presidency of the government until after the armistice in February.

He was elected to the National Assembly by eight Départements, and sat for Morbihan. In October he was elected president of the council general for Morbihan. In July 1872 he retired from political life and in 1873 from the army. He published in 1873 Pour la vérité et pour la justice, in justification of the government of national defence, and in 1879 L'Armée française en 1879, par un officier en retraite, a sort of supplement to his former work of 1867.

On October 7, 1896, he died in Tours.

== Decorations ==
- Légion d'honneur
  - Knight (2 January 1844)
  - Officer (9 August 1854)
  - Commander (22 September 1855)
  - Grand Officer (12 August 1861)
- Médaille Commémorative d'Italie (1859)
- Médaille Coloniale with "Algérie" bar
- Knight of the Order of Leopold (Belgium)
- Grand Officer of the Order of Saints Maurice and Lazarus (Sardinia)
- Companion of the Order of the Bath (UK)

== Notes ==
Political offices
Preceded by Napoléon III (Emperor of the French)	De Facto Head of State of France (chairman of the Government of National Defense); 4 September 1870 – 13 February 1871	Succeeded by Adolphe Thiers (Chief Executive of the French Republic)
