= Louis-Joseph-Narcisse Marchand =

Napoleon Bonaparte's valet (1791–1876)

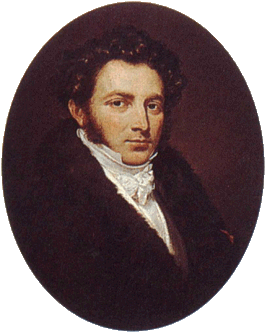
- Born: March 28, 1791; Paris, France
- Died: June 19, 1876 (aged 85); Trouville, France
- Occupation: Imperial servant
- Known for: Acting as Napoleon Bonaparte's valet; His memoirs

Signature
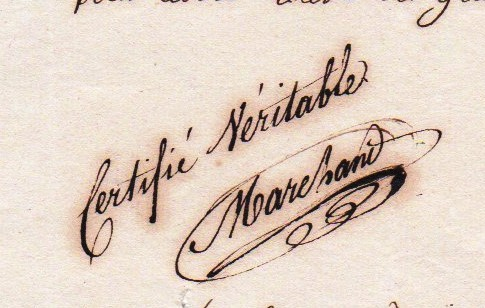

Louis-Joseph-Narcisse Marchand (born Paris, March 28, 1791, died Trouville, June 19, 1876) was Napoleon Bonaparte's valet and the nominated liquidator of his succession.

Born into a middle-class family from the Eure-et-Loir department, in 1811 he became an Imperial servant. He remained faithful to Napoleon after the first abdication and was selected to replace the Emperor's main valet who had fled. He followed the Emperor thereafter including to Saint Helena. He remained faithful to Napoleon so much so that on the Emperor's deathbed, the title of count was decreed to him - a title which was confirmed to him in 1869 by Napoleon III. After the death of Napoleon I, Marchand returned to France where he married in 1823; he took part in the Retour des cendres (Return of the [Napoleon's] ashes) in 1840.

His memoirs have been helpful to historians, though the facts described were not written with impartiality and dispassion. A new edition of his memoirs was published by Greenhill Books in 2018.
