= French ship Normandie (1835) =

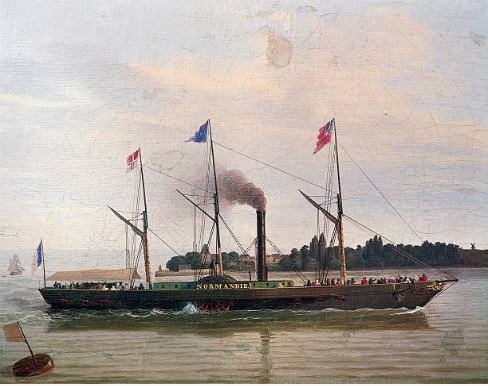
- Normandie making the Le Havre-Honfleur crossing in 1837

History

France
- Name: Normandie
- Launched: 1835
- In service: July 1835

General characteristics
- Length: 189.75 feet (imperial)
- Propulsion: steam engine (120 HP), paddle wheels

The Normandie built in 1835, was a French paddle steamer working in conjunction with her sister ship the Seine (1836) on the lower reaches of the Seine. The route she serviced was between Le Havre and Rouen via Honfleur with secondary stops along the way. She gained fame by being a participant in the retour des cendres ("return of the ashes") of Napoleon to France.

== Service ==
The Normandie, was 178 French feet in length, 42 feet wide, and 12 feet high. She was over 190 tons, and could carry 1000 passengers. She was built in Le Havre by M. Lenormand. She was equipped with two low pressure engines of 60 horse power each. The oscillating cylinder steam engines for both the ‘’Normandie’’ and the ‘’Seine’’ were built by Barnes Miller, Ravenhill and Co. of Glasshouse Fields, Ratcliffe, London. The company had been stated in 1822 as Miller and Barnes. In 1835 they won approval as a supplier of Marine engines to the British Royal Navy. Barnes left the business that year to go on his own, and from that point the company was known as Miller and Ravenhill. Robert Barnes (1798–1852) was a godson of James Watt.

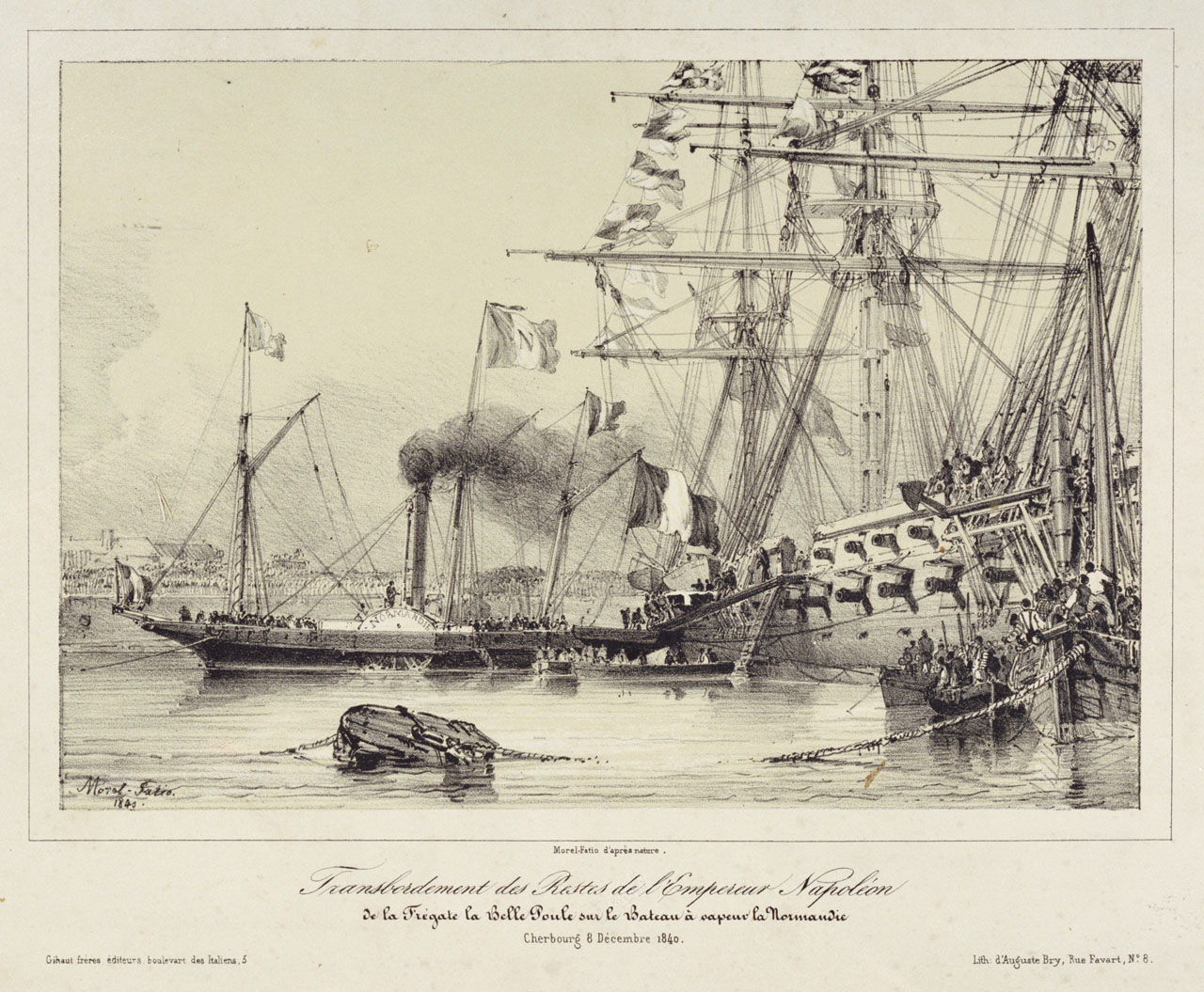
Normandie (left) alongside Belle-Poule in Cherbourg

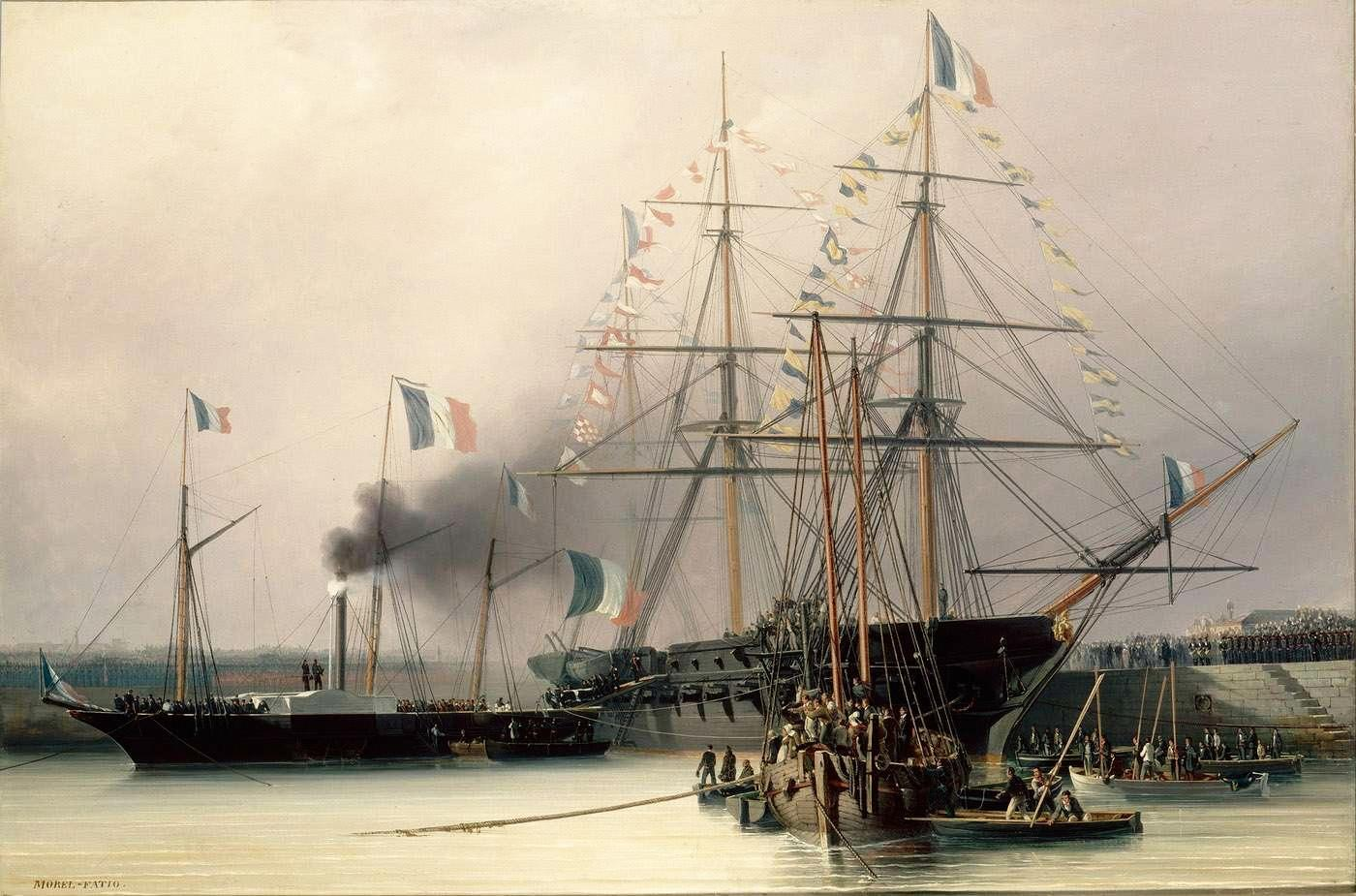
Napoleon's coffin being loaded onto the Normandie

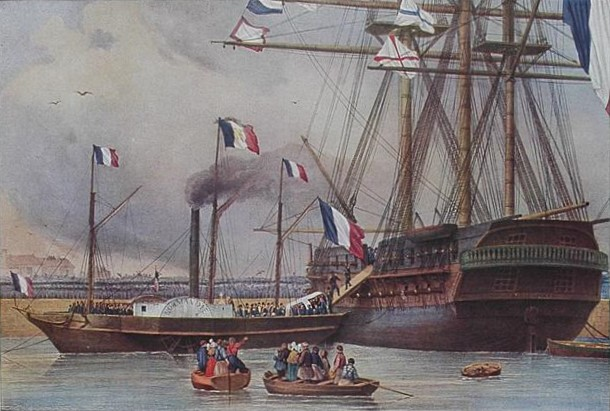
The boarding of the body of Napoleon at Cherbourg from the frigate Belle Poule to the Normandie

The Seine also from the same builder was smaller, 150 feet in length, her engines from the same maker were 40 horsepower each. She could carry 800 passengers.

The Normandie (Captain Bambine) and the Seine (Captain Fautrel) were operated by a new company which began operating in 1835, Cie des paquetbots a vapeur sur la Seine (directors Jalliant and Viellard). They started the company with capital of 600,000 francs. Both vessels were primarily for passenger use, but they also carried cargo.

On her first journet from Le Havre to Rouen it took her 6 1/2 hours, the fastest sailing to that date according to the Rouen newspapers. In the first six months of 1835 she carried approx. 2,600 tons of cargo.

She commenced carrying passengers on a ferry service from Le Havre to Rouen on 25 July 1835. The distance of the route was 150 leagues (approximately 100 English miles), which they often achieved in less than 7 hours. The fare for the full journey, and major stops (including Honfleur) was 10 francs and 6 francs for interim stops on the Seine.

On board she had a house band, dressed in uniform, military in appearance, which was unusual at the time.

The Seine made her maiden voyage carrying passengers on 15 April 1836.

By May 1837 both steamers were picking up and laying off passengers at Honfleur, using rowing boats to ferry to the shore.

On 10 December 1840 she had the honour of receiving the ashes Napoléon from the Belle Poule at Cherbourg. La Normandie whose crew were augmented by sailors from the company numbered 200, all in military style uniform, carried the coffin in a convoy of 5 steamers with great ceremony as far as the mouth of the River Seine at Val-de-la-Haye, where it was transferred on 16 December to a small ship La Dorade 3 (1840), which took Napoleon on to the Paris suburb of Courbevoie. As a souvenir of the event the company fixed a cast iron eagle to the back of the bridge and a balustrade was erected to enclose the space that the coffin took up.

=== The Dorades ===
The Dorades were small steamers which plied between Rouen (at the Quai de' Harcourt, opposite the hotel de Rouen) and Paris. The first came into service in 1839, and was followed by at least three others of the same name. at least 4 were in service by the close of 1840. They were built by a French engineer M. Cavé of Paris, and owned by a M. Rouvin. They were powered simple high pressure engines. Their great rivals on the Seine was a similar fleet the Etoile's. In 1844, the Normandie and her partner the Seine carried between Le Havre and Rouen almost 46,000 tons of cargo.

== The railways ==
Among the first railway lines, the Paris–Le Havre railway opened a section from Paris to Rouen on 9 May 1843, followed by the section from Rouen to Le Havre that opened on 22 March 1847. The railway from Paris to Honfleur opened in two stages; a branch line from Pont-l'Évêque on 7 July 1862, and the main line from Paris on 8 August 1889.

Passenger numbers were to fall and the Normandie and Seine steamers would stop servicing the route in 1860.
