= Government of National Defense =

Government of the Third Republic of France from 1870–1871

- 1st Government of the French Third Republic

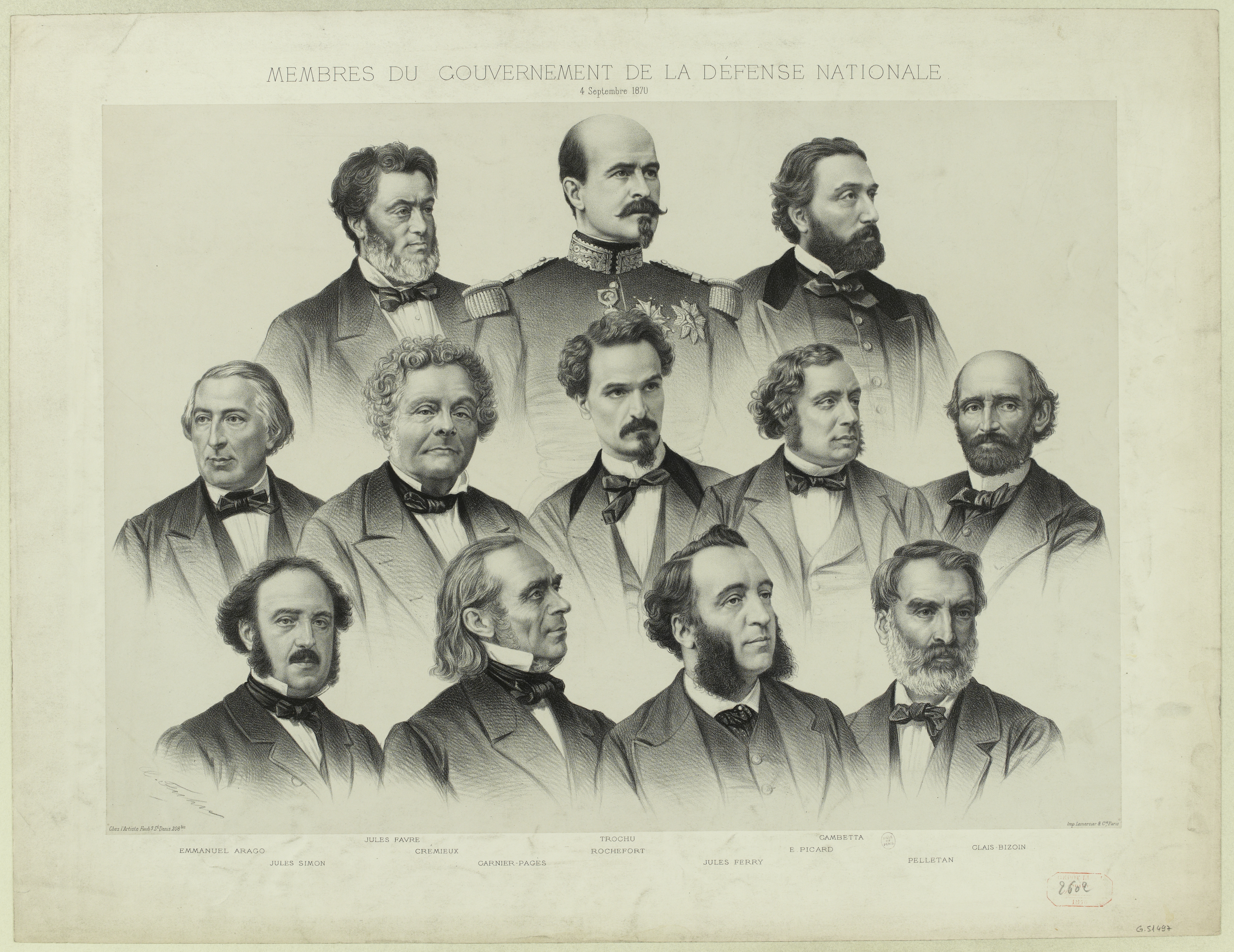
- Members of the Government of National Defense
- Date formed: 4 September 1870
- Date dissolved: 13 February 1871

People and organisations
- Head of state: Louis Jules Trochu (de facto)
- Head of government: Louis Jules Trochu

History
- Predecessor: Cousin-Montauban
- Successor: Dufaure I

The Government of National Defense (French: Gouvernement de la Défense nationale) was the first government of the Third Republic of France from 4 September 1870 to 13 February 1871 during the Franco-Prussian War. It was formed after the proclamation of the Republic in Paris on 4 September, which in turn followed the surrender and capture of Emperor Napoleon III by the Prussians at the Battle of Sedan. The government, headed by General Louis Jules Trochu, was under Prussian siege in Paris. Breakouts were attempted twice, but met with disaster and rising dissatisfaction of the public. In late January the government, having further enraged the population of Paris by crushing a revolutionary uprising, surrendered to the Prussians. Two weeks later, it was replaced by the new government of Adolphe Thiers, which soon passed a variety of financial laws in an attempt to pay reparations and thus oblige the Prussians to leave France, leading to the outbreak of revolutions in French cities, and the ultimate creation of the Paris Commune.

== Origins ==
When the Franco-Prussian War began in 1870, France was under the rule of Emperor Napoleon III. A National Assembly was based in Paris, but its powers were limited. Widespread discontent amongst Assembly members before the war, particularly amongst socialist members, had given Louis-Napoleon many enemies. At the disastrous battle of Sedan, Napoleon was captured by the Prussian Army, leaving France effectively without a government. When news of Napoleon's capture reached Paris, leading members of the National Assembly rushed to the Hôtel de Ville to declare a new government. At the Hôtel de Ville, Léon Gambetta publicly declared the founding of the Government of National Defence on 4 September, and the government immediately assumed control of all affairs in France, intending to continue the war against Prussia.

== Notable members ==
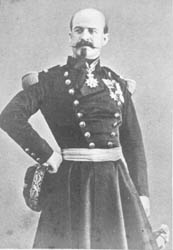
General Louis-Jules Trochu, head of the Government of National Defence

Although various political factions were included (with the exception of the Bonapartists), Orleanists, Legitimists, and other conservatives exercised actual power in the Government of National Defence. When offered the post of president of the government, General Jules Trochu, an Orleanist, accepted it based on the Assembly's promise that they would "resolutely defend religion, property, and the family".

- Louis Jules Trochu, President of the Government
- Léon Gambetta, Minister of the Interior
- Jules Favre, Vice-President, Minister of Foreign Affairs
- Adolphe Le Flô, Minister of War
- Léon Martin Fourichon, Minister of the Navy and the Colonies
- Ernest Picard, Minister of Finance
- Jules Ferry, Secretary of the Government
- Jules Simon, Minister of Education, Religion, and Arts
- Adolphe Crémieux, Minister of Justice
- Emmanuel Arago, Minister of the Interior
- Pierre Frédéric Dorian, Minister of Public Works
- Henri Rochefort, Minister without Portfolio
- Alexandre Glais-Bizoin, Minister without Portfolio
- Louis-Antoine Garnier-Pagès, Minister without Portfolio
- Eugène Pelletan, Minister without Portfolio

The citizens of Paris wondered how long the uneasy truce between the revolutionary left and the more conservative Republicans of the Government of National Defense would last. The Government of National Defense received official recognition from the United States, foreign Republics, and Latin Europe. The great world powers such as Britain, Russia, and Austria, withheld recognition, choosing to wait for a broad national election. Prussia refused to recognise the new government. The Prussian Chancellor, Otto von Bismarck, was concerned that the new body could not act as France's government, as it was composed entirely of men from Paris, without any consideration being given to the rest of France. This was not a great concern to the Government though, as its members intended to continue the war against Prussia, as long as Prussia continued to demand territorial concessions (these being Alsace and Lorraine).

== Besieged ==
With most of the army captured at Sedan, the Government of National Defence called almost all military units from across France, including marines, naval units, and troops on foreign service in Rome, Algeria, and French colonies, to aid in the defence of Paris before the Prussians reached the city. The Government greatly increased the already formidable fortifications around Paris and brought in vast quantities of food from the countryside, to feed the swollen population of the city throughout the expected siege. Having sworn in General Trochu as President, the National Assembly left Paris and relocated to Bordeaux. Concerned that the rest of the country might complain about the Parisian-dominated government, Admiral Fourichon and Gaston Cremieux, both elderly men, were dispatched to Tours as a representative delegation on behalf of the government in Paris. By 20 September 1870 Paris was completely surrounded and cut off from the rest of unoccupied France.

On 7 October Minister of the Interior Léon Gambetta left besieged Paris by hot air balloon, arriving in Tours three days later, from where he and his deputy Charles de Freycinet directed the war across unoccupied France. Although they were part of the same national government, the governments in Paris and Tours often acted without consulting each other, due largely to the problem of communication between besieged Paris and the outside world. The National Assembly in Bordeaux had very little say in government affairs, as they had no reliable means of contacting Paris and Gambetta did not have time to wait for the Assembly to debate issues. As a result, Gambetta became the virtual dictator of unoccupied France during the war.

Throughout the siege, the Government of National Defence was reluctant to try to break out of Paris, and as the siege wore on, the population of Paris grew more and more frustrated at the Government. The government did in fact try to break out twice, once in late November 1870 and once again in mid-January 1871. The "Great Sortie", beginning on the night of 28 November, was a cataclysmic disaster. Thousands of soldiers were killed and the population of Paris, whose hopes had been raised far beyond rationality, were shattered by the news of the sortie's defeat. Blame was heaped upon the Government of National Defence, and increased through December as the city's food supplies began to run out. The population was angry that the Government was suspicious of the National Guard based in Paris - whilst the civilian population saw the National Guard as an unstoppable force, the Government perceived them as a rabble of ill-disciplined drunks who would run away at the first shot. When the Government decided to placate civilian sentiment by using the National Guard in the next sortie of 18 January 1871, their suspicions were confirmed as the National Guard panicked and fled back into Paris, provoking the civilian population to blame the Government for being incompetent and cowardly.

== End of the government ==
After the failure of the 18 January sortie it was obvious to the Government that they would never break out of the city. In addition, food stocks were running dangerously low and the city was enduring constant artillery bombardments from the Prussians, and although the shelling was surprisingly ineffective, its demoralising effect on Paris was severe. The Government sacked General Trochu as Governor of Paris on 22 January (although he remained President of the Republic) and replaced him with the elderly General Joseph Vinoy. Jules Favre, though, held real control, and became the de facto leader of the government. A small revolutionary uprising on 23 January was crushed with force by the Government of National Defence, further infuriating the population of Paris. On 28 January 1871 Paris surrendered. Favre, on behalf of the Government of National Defence, and Bismarck signed a Convention on the Armistice and the Capitulation of Paris. Under this Convention, Favre agreed to humiliating terms demanded by the Prussians, including the payment of 200 million francs indemnity within a fortnight, over 5 billion francs in total war reparations, and the surrender of the strong fortresses surrounding Paris. In Tours, Gambetta received the news of the surrender by telegram on 29 January, and although he still wished to fight on, was convinced to step down by a group of diplomats who arrived from Paris by train on 6 February.

The negotiations had guaranteed national elections to create a new French government, and on 8 February 1871 French citizens (except those in the Prussian-occupied territories) voted for a new government. The elections returned an overwhelming number of conservative, middle-class, rural Deputies, who set up a new seat of government at the palace of Versailles. The new National Assembly elected Adolphe Thiers as Chief Executive of the new government and Thiers took over the position of President of France from General Trochu on 13 February. Eager to pay reparations and thus oblige the Prussians to leave France, the new government passed a variety of financial laws which deeply angered Parisians, leading to the outbreak of revolutions in French cities, and the ultimate creation of the Paris Commune.

== Sources ==
- Horne, Sir Alistair (2007-11-27). The Fall of Paris: The Siege and the Commune 1870-71. Penguin (Non-Classics). ISBN 978-0-14-103063-0.
- Chrastil, Rachel (2023). Bismarck's War: The Franco-Prussian War and the Making of Modern Europe. Basic Books. ISBN 9780141991610.
