= Louis Marie Baptiste Atthalin =

French politician and army officer

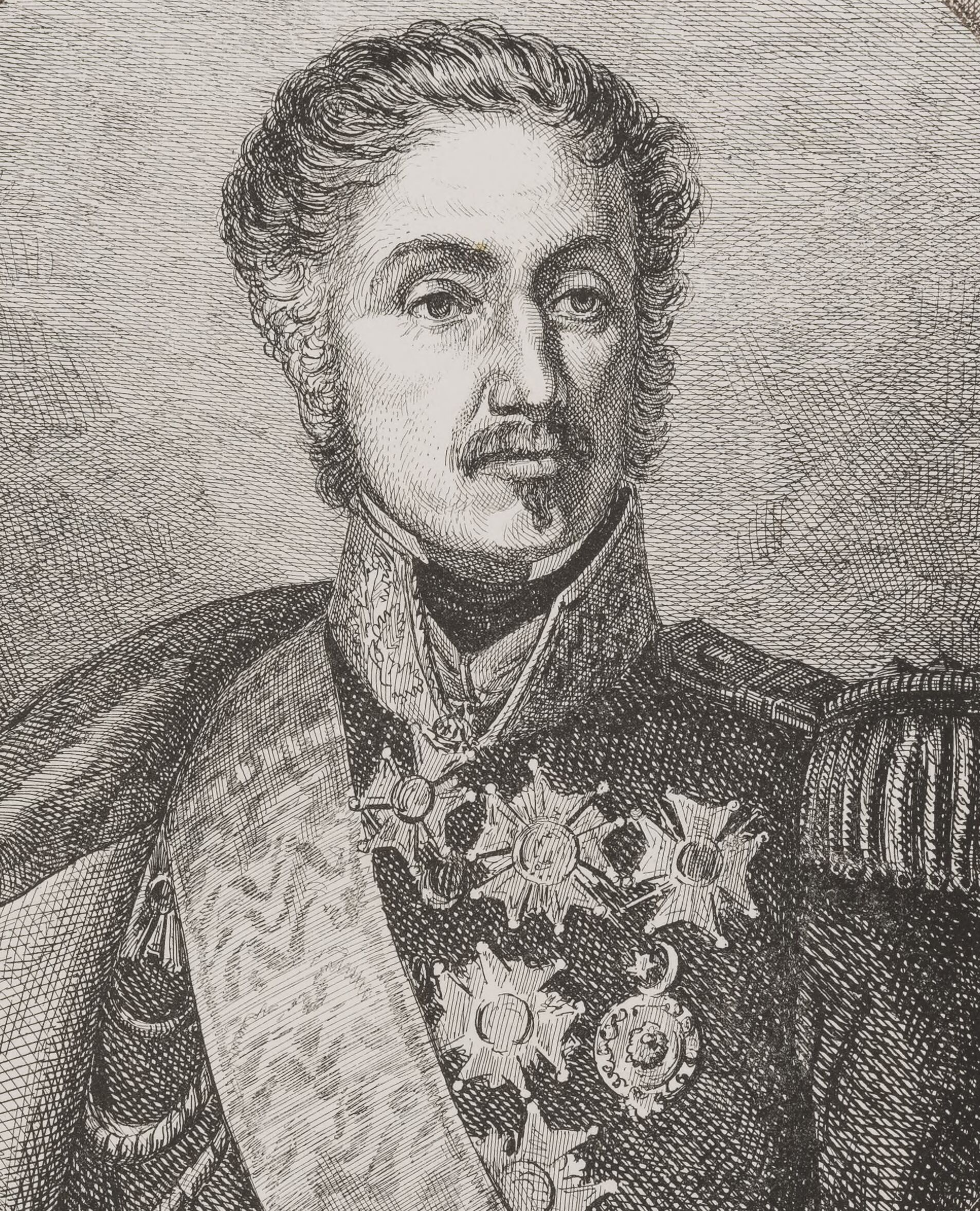
Louis Atthalin

Louis Marie Baptiste Atthalin, Baron Atthalin (born 22 June 1784 at Colmar, Haut-Rhin – 3 September 1856) was a French Army officer, politician, painter, watercolorist, and lithographer. He died in Colmar on 3 September 1856. Louis-Philippe I sent Atthalin to Nicholas I of Russia to inform him of the former's accession. He was also present at the reburial of Napoleon's remains in 1840.

== Military career ==
Baron Atthalin became a student of the École Polytechnique on 1 November 1802. He acquired the officer candidate rank of second lieutenant (engineering) on 23 September 1804, appointed lieutenant 17 November 1806, and captain 16 September 1808.

Campaigning with Napoleon's Grande Armée in 1806 and 1807, Atthalin distinguished himself in military actions at Gardadeu, Molérès-M-Rey, and Wals. Atthalin also campaigned at Texel in 1810, again with the Grande Armée in 1812–1814, and was present at the Blockade of Landau in 1815.

During his time as a captain Atthalin came to the attention of Napoleon, who made him an aide de camp on 14 April 1811. Atthalin rose to battalion commander on 18 November 1813, and colonel on 15 March 1814. In this same year the Duke of Orléans, Louis-Philippe d'Orléans (the future king, Louis-Philippe 1), named Atthalin as one of his own aide de camps. On 26 April 1815, during the Hundred Days of Napoleon, he was employed as the Commandant of Engineering at Landau.

On 12 August 1830, the now King Louis-Philippe I named Atthalin, now himself a general, as Maréchal de Camp. Atthalin, though, retained his role as aide de camp. The King sent Atthalin to Russia, to officially inform the Emperor Nicholas I of his new reign.

Supported by the votes of the ministers of the King, Atthalin was elected to the fourth electoral college of Bas-Rhin (Strasbourg) on 23 January 1831. He remained as a member in what was referred to as the Chamber of Peers, until 11 October 1836. Atthalin continued to faithfully support the kingdom (known as the July Monarchy), and on 16 November 1840, he was promoted to lieutenant general. The subsequent fall and exile of the Orléans family, however, left him stripped of his titles. He retired on 14 August 1848 and stayed away from politics for the remainder of his life.

== Honours ==
- Legion of Honour,
  - Knight (3 October 1812)
  - Officer (24 October 1813)
  - Commander (4 May 1821)
  - Grand Officer (21 March 1831)
  - Grand Cross (15 September 1846)
- Order of Leopold
  - Commander (17.04.1833)
  - Grand Cordon (23.07.1847)
- Knight in the Royal and Military Order of Saint Louis
- Grand Cross in the Royal and Military Order of Saint Ferdinand (18 September 1846)
- Order of Glory (Tunisia) (25 September 1846)

== Artistic career ==
In 1817, Atthalin was introduced to oil painting by Horace Vernet. Also a lithographer, he collaborated on several works such as Voyages pittoresques et romantiques dans l'ancienne France by Isidore Taylor and Charles Nodier or Antiquités de l'Alsace by Golbéry and Schweighaeuser. After 1848, he retired to Alsace where he devoted himself to watercolour.

Without direct descendants, Baron Atthalin adopted his nephew Louis Laurent-Atthalin in 1843, whose vocation as a watercolourist he encouraged.

== Sources ==
- Mullié, Charles (1852). "ATTHALIN (LOUIS-MARIE-JEAN-BAPTISTE, baron)" . Biographie des célébrités militaires des armées de terre et de mer de 1789 à 1850 (in French). Paris: Poignavant et Compagnie.
