= Félix Coquereau =

Félix Coquereau (28 November 1808, Laval - 9 November 1866, Paris) was chief almoner to the French Navy. He accompanied the final return of Napoleon's remains to France in 1840.
