= Alexandre Glais-Bizoin =

French politician (1800–1877)

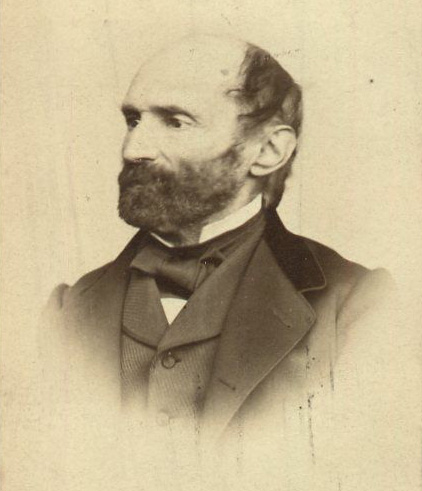
Alexandre Glais-Bizoin

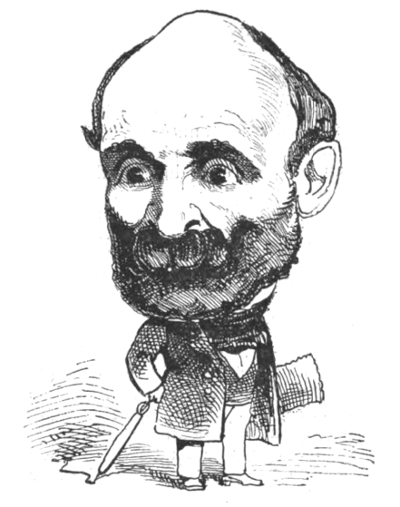
Caricature of Glais-Bizoin in Le Trombinoscope by Touchatout in 1874.

Alexandre Olivier Glais de Bizoin (9 March 1800 – 6 November 1877), also known as Glais-Bizoin (French pronunciation: [ɡlɛ bizwɛ̃]) was a French republican politician during the July Monarchy and critic of the First French Empire and the retour des cendres.

== Biography ==
Alexandre Glais-Bizoin was born in Quintin to a rich family from the department of Côtes-du-Nord. He was the grandson of a textiles merchant from Saint-Thélo and the son of Olivier Glais-Bizoin (1742-1801), a textiles merchant and delegate to the National Assembly of France. Alexandre completed his studies for a law degree, but after becoming a lawyer in 1822 left the bar for politics. Aligning with the left, he fought with the liberals against the House of Bourbon, restored to throne after the fall of the First Empire in 1815.

After the July Revolution of 1830, Glais-Bizoin was named to the general council (conseil général) of Côtes-du-Nord and on July 5, 1831, he was elected delegate to the National Assembly from Loudéac, a commune in Côtes-du-Nord. He joined the far-left and was repeatedly reelected during the entire reign of Louis Philippe: June 21, 1834; November 4, 1837; March 2, 1839; July 9, 1842; and August 1, 1846.

The Dictionnaire des parlementaires français describes Glais-Bizoin thus: "a determined adversary of the government's policies, he distinguished himself less by his speeches than by his interruptions." He was one of 39 delegates to support the 1832 June Rebellion, an unsuccessful republican insurrection. He pestered the established powers with questions and critiques, most of all working toward a reduction in taxes on salt and letters and the abolition of required stamps for journals. He opposed the September 1835 laws, which consolidated the power of the July Monarchy and limited certain freedoms. And contrary to most other parliamentarians, he spoke out against the retour des cendres, or the repatriation of the remains of Napoleon Bonaparte after his death in 1840. Glais-Bizoin said, "Bonapartist ideas are one of the open wounds of our time; they represent that which is most fatal to the emancipation of peoples, most contrary to the independence of the human spirit."

On the subject of the postal system, Glais-Bizoin is known for having proposed the adoption of a uniform rate for sending a letter, regardless of the distance to the destination. He fought for this reform between 1839 and 1847, and it was finally adopted in 1848. On the other hand, he had little to do with the establishment of postal stamps, beliefs to the contrary notwithstanding.

He supported electoral reform, and took active part in the Campagne des banquets, which resulted in the overthrow of the Louis Philippe. After having associated himself with those demanding the indictment of François Guizot, the last prime minister in the July Monarchy, he rallied to the newly established French Second Republic. He was elected to the constituent assembly from the department of Côtes-du-Nord on April 23, 1848.

Toward the end of the French Second Empire in 1869, he was elected a deputy to the national assembly from the Seine, a former department encompassing Paris and its close suburbs. He participated in the Government of National Defense, the first government of the French Third Republic led by Léon Gambetta which rose to power after military disaster in the Franco-Prussian War caused the collapse of Napoleon III.

In 1868, Glais-Bizoin was one of the founders of the journal La Tribune. He hired Émile Zola as secretary for the journal in 1870.

He died in 1877 at Saint-Brieuc, where he had been head of the municipal government since 1870.

== Sources ==
- "Alexandre Glais-Bizoin", in Adolphe Robert and Gaston Cougny, Dictionnaire des parlementaires français (1789-1891), Bourloton, Paris, 1889 Edition details Wikisource
- René Huguen, Glais-Bizoin et le Grand dossier du chemin de fer, édité à compte d'auteur
- Nicolas Verdier, De l'égalité territoriale à la loi sociale, un député obstiné, Alexandre Glais-Bizoin, 1800-1877, Paris, Comité pour l'histoire de la Poste, 2003.
- Nicolas Verdier, « Passer du local au national, ou comment devient-on député sous la Restauration ? », CYBERGEO, Journée à l'EHESS (École des Hautes Études en Sciences Sociales). Échelles et territoires, Paris, France, 29 avril 2002, article 270 mis en ligne le 10 mai 2004, modifié le 27 avril 2007.
