= Louis-Étienne Saint-Denis =

French Legion of Honour recipient and imperial guardsman (1788–1856)

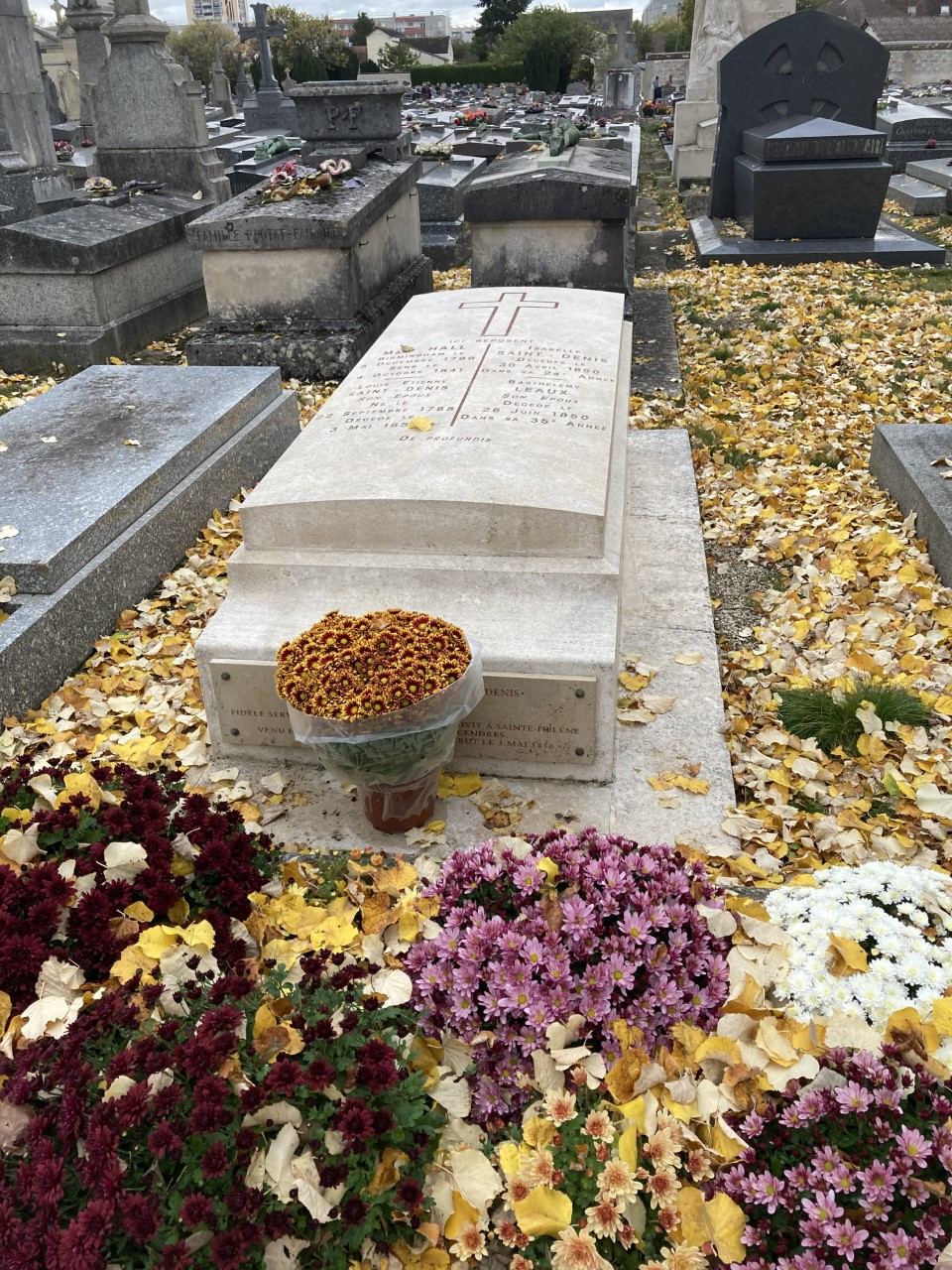
Grave in Sens.

Louis-Étienne Saint-Denis (22 September 1788 – 3 May 1856) was a member of the Mamelukes of the Imperial Guard, leading him to be known in his lifetime as "Mamelouk Ali". He was most notable as a faithful servant to Napoleon I during his two exiles on Elba and Saint Helena.

== Life ==
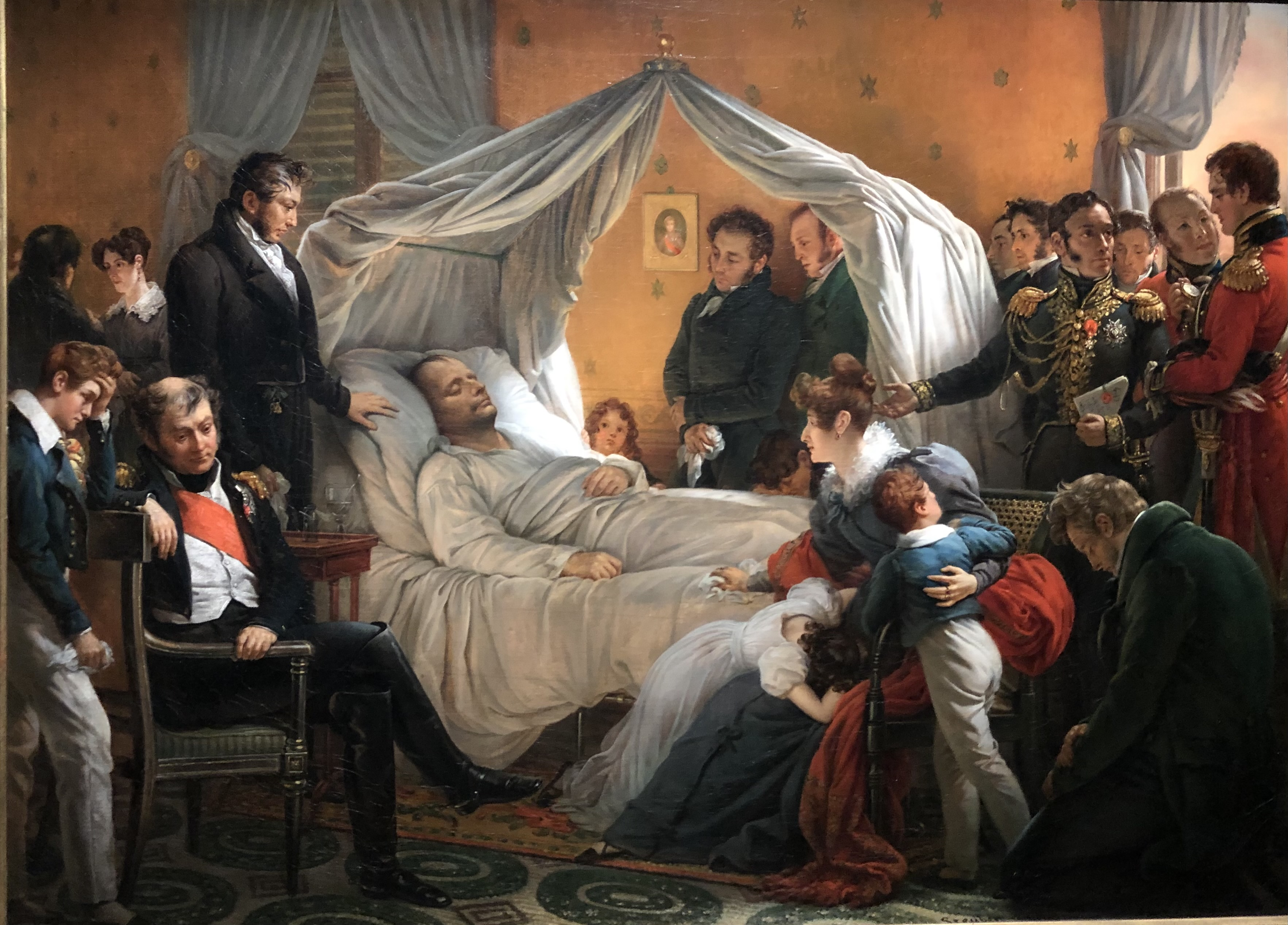
Charles de Steuben's Death of Napoleon; Mamelouk Ali is circled.

He was born in Versailles to Étienne Saint-Denis (a royal stableman) and Marie-Louise Notté (daughter of an officer in the royal kitchens). His parents gave him a good education, allowing him to become a notary clerk in Paris. His father knew Armand de Caulaincourt, who recommended Louis-Étienne for a post at the imperial court and thus on 1 May 1806 he became a stableman in Napoleon's household. Five years later, on 11 December 1811, Napoleon made him his second-valet-de-chambre - Napoleon also ordered him to change his name to "Mameluk Ali", after the man he was replacing in the role.

He accompanied Napoleon to Russia and Elba, during the Hundred Days and finally to Saint Helena. In the meantime he gained promotion to first mamluk in April 1814, after Roustam Raza fled following Napoleon's first abdication. On Saint Helena he did everything he could to ameliorate the emperor's conditions, such as preparing an eau de Cologne for him from local ingredients and acting as his copyist and librarian. In 1819 he married Mary Hall, the Birmingham-born governess to grand-marshal Henri Gatien Bertrand's children. Two years later his devotion was rewarded in Napoleon's will by a substantial sum and the task of taking part of the emperor's library to his son, the former King of Rome.

After his return to France in 1821, he raised a family and took a small job in a riding school, publishing his Souvenirs in 1826. He also joined the expedition to bring Napoleon's remains back to France in 1840. Napoleon III made him a Chevalier of the Légion d'honneur in 1854 and he died two years later in Sens in northern France, where he was also buried.

== Depictions in popular culture ==
- Napoleone a Sant'Elena, Italian miniseries, 1973 - played by Varo Soleri
- Monsieur N., Franco-British film, 2003 - played by Igor Skreblin

== Works ==
- Souvenirs, 1826.
- Journal inédit du retour des Cendres, 1840

== Bibliography ==
- (in French) Jacques Jourquin, Journal inédit du Retour des cendres par le mameluck Ali (1840), déchiffrage, annotations et présentation des manuscrits, Tallandier, 2003 ISBN 978-2847341225
- (in French) Jacques Jourquin, Souvenirs du mameluck Ali en grande partie inédits sur la campagne de Russie en 1812, déchiffrage, établissement, présentation et annotation des manuscrits, coll. de l'Institut Napoléon n° 7, éditions SPM, 2012 ISBN 978-2901952961
- (in French) Jacques Jourquin, Souvenirs en bonne partie inédits du mameluck Ali (1813-1815), déchiffrage, établissement, présentation et annotation des manuscrits, coll. de l'Institut Napoléon n° 13, SPM, 2015 ISBN 978-2917232378
