= Monument à la République =

Monument in Paris, France

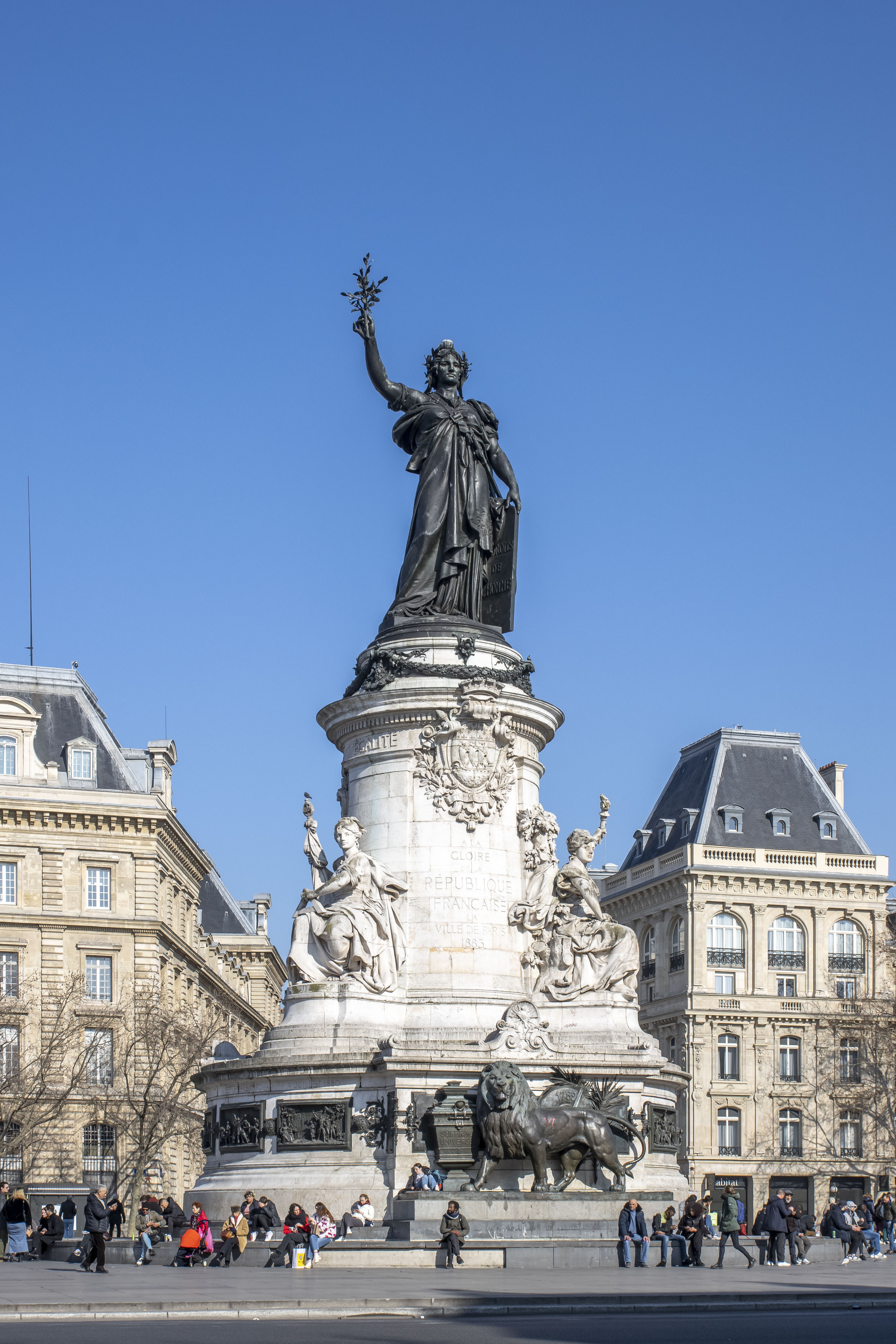
- Interactive map of Monument à la République
- Location: Place de la République, Paris (France)
- Coordinates: 48.8675°N 2.3638°E
- Designer: Léopold and Charles Morice
- Type: Sculpture
- Material: Bronze, stone
- Width: 13 m (42 ft 8 in)
- Height: 25 m (82 ft 0 in)
- Inauguration date: 14 July 1883
- Protection: Monument historique (since 2021)

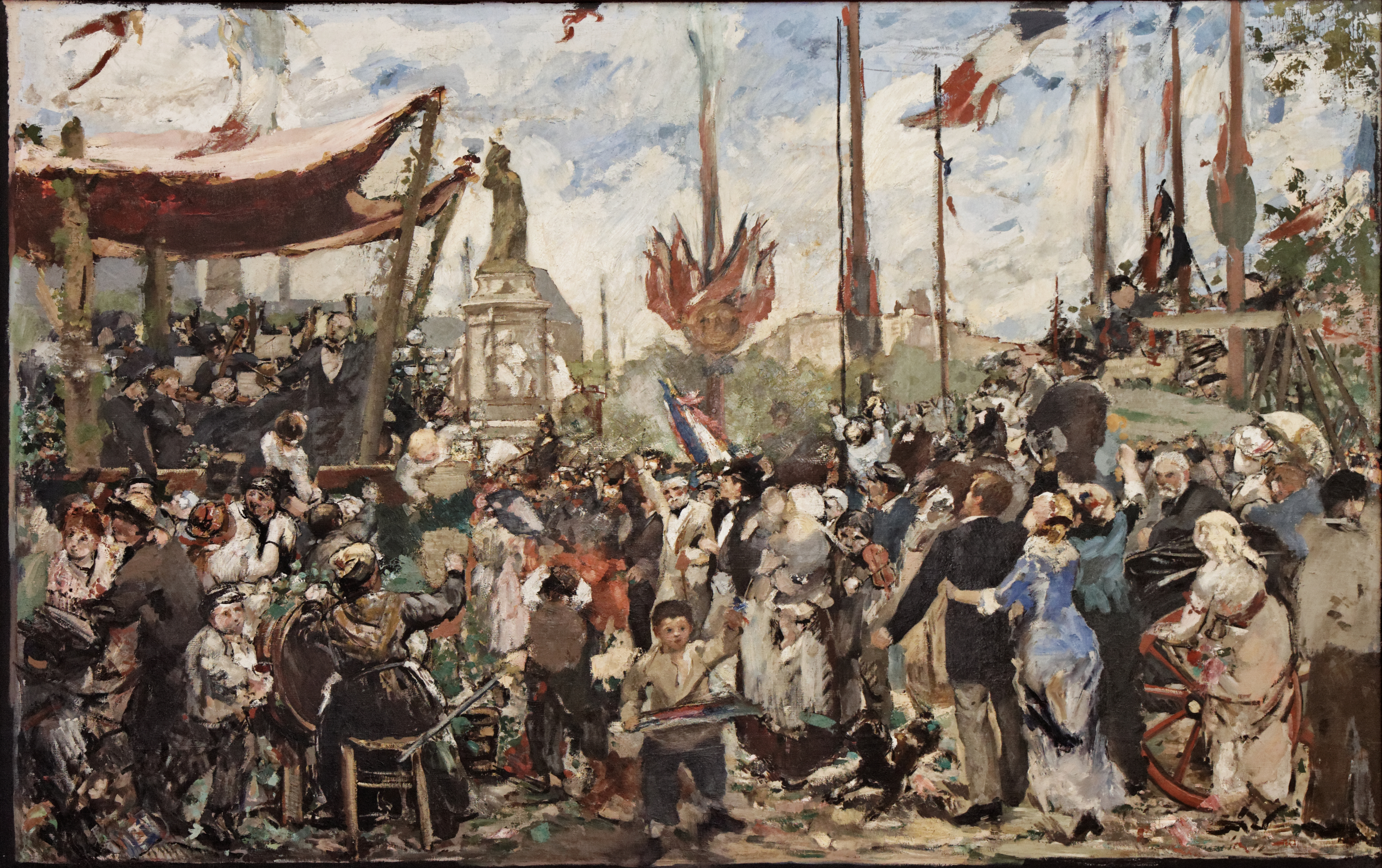
Alfred Roll, Le 14 juillet 1880, inauguration du Monument à la République (1882), Petit Palais, Paris.

The Monument à la République (French pronunciation: [mɔnymɑ̃ a la ʁepyblik]), also called Statue de la République ([staty də la ʁepyblik]), is a monumental sculpture by the sculptor Léopold Morice. Inaugurated in 1883 on the Place de la République in Paris, it represents Marianne, an allegory of the republic. The monument is often a focal point of mass demonstrations in Paris.

== Description ==
The monument is located in the center of the Place de la République, at the tripoint between the 3rd, 10th and 11th arrondissements.

The bronze statue is 9.5 metres (31 ft) high on a 15.5 metres (51 ft) stone pedestal with a diameter of 13 metres (43 ft) at ground level. The pedestal is decorated with three statues each representing liberty, equality, and fraternity. Around the pedestal, under those statues, are a group of 12 high reliefs in bronze representing significant dates for the French Republic. A bronze statue of a lion symbolizing universal suffrage is at the foot of the monument. A fountain was added in 2013 at ground level.

=== Statue de la République ===
The top of the pedestal is occupied by a 9.5 metres (31 ft) high statue of Marianne, symbolizing the Republic. She is represented standing, wearing a toga and a baldric on which is mounted a sword. She is dressed at the same time with a Phrygian cap, symbol of liberty and a plant crown.

In her right hand, the statue bears an olive branch, a peace symbol. Her left hand rests on a tablet with the inscription "human rights" (French: droits de l'homme).

The bronzes were cast by Fonderie Thiébaut Frères in 1883.

=== Pedestal ===
The pedestal was made by the architect François-Charles Morice, the brother of the sculptor. It consists of two distinct cylindrical parts: one about 4 m high; the other above it, longer and narrower. The higher part holds the Marianne and is decorated under her feet by a bronze garland, the coat of arms of Paris, and the inscription "to the glory of the French Republic - the city of Paris - 1883" (French: à la gloire de la République Française - la ville de Paris - 1883).

Around the column are three stone statues, each one an allegory of a word of the French motto.

- La Liberté is seated to the left of the Republic. She wears a torch in her left hand, her right hand rests on her knee holding a broken chain. In the background, an oak is sculpted in relief in the column.
- L'Égalité is seated to the right. She holds the flag of the Republic in her right hand, whose pole is marked with the initials "R.F."; in her left hand she holds a carpenter level, a symbol of equality.
- La Fraternité, behind Marianne, is represented by a woman casting her caring gaze on two children reading a book, an allegory of knowledge. A sheaf of wheat and a bouquet evoke abundance.

Two medallions marked with Labor and Pax, decorated with fasces are found on the sides.

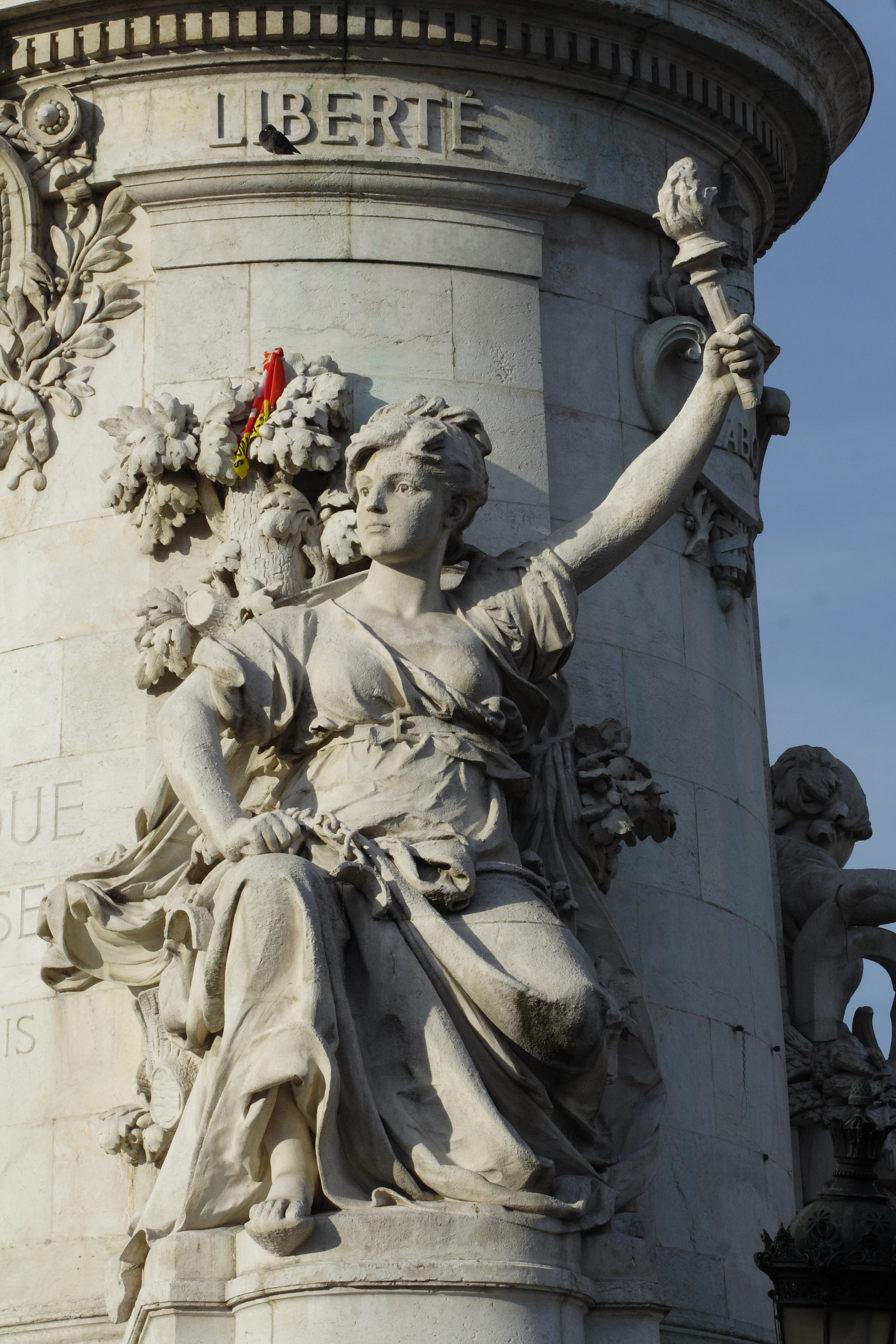
La Liberté

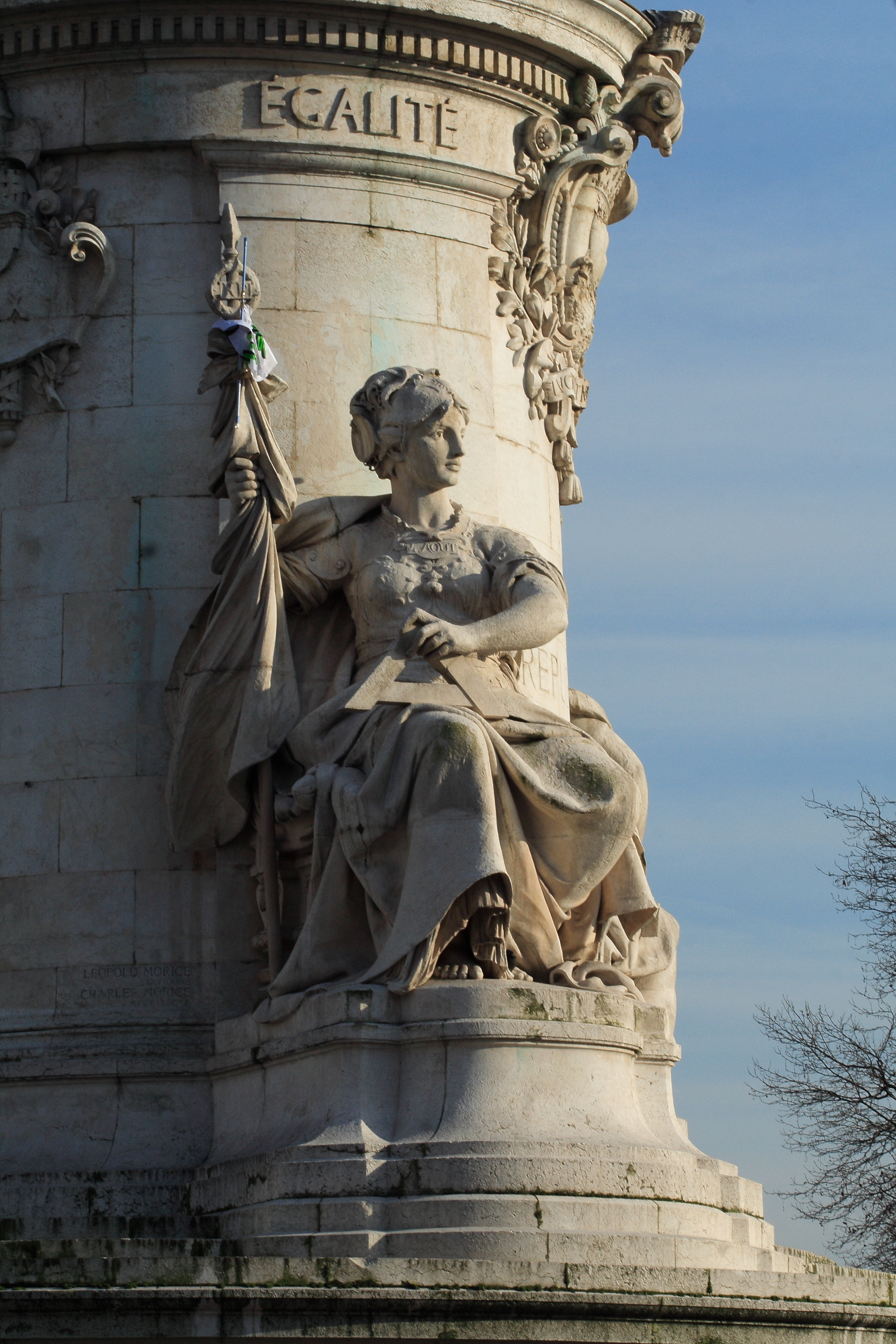
L'Égalité

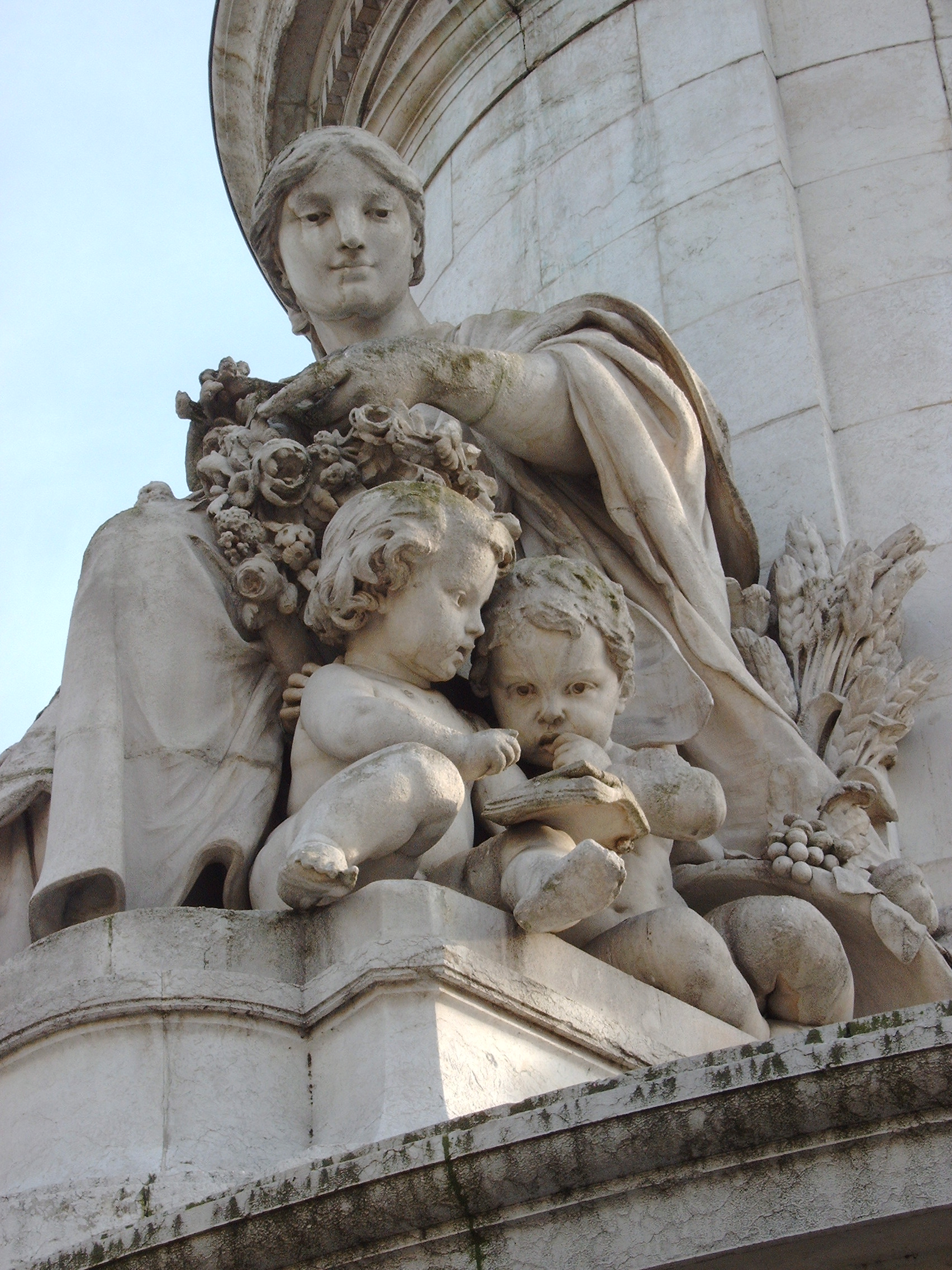
La Fraternité

=== High reliefs ===
The stone pedestal is surrounded with twelve high reliefs in bronze, made by Léopold Morice. Connected with rosettes and arranged at eye level, they constitute a chronology of events marking the history of the French Republic, between 1789 and 1880 :

Image	Date	Event
	20 June 1789	Tennis Court Oath
	14 July 1789	Storming of the Bastille
	4 August 1789	Abolition of feudalism
	14 July 1790	Fête de la Fédération
	11 July 1792	Proclamation of « La Patrie en danger »
	20 September 1792	Battle of Valmy
	21 September 1792	Proclamation of the abolition of the monarchy
	1 June 1794	Glorious First of June
	29 July 1830	July Revolution
	4 March 1848	Adoption of the universal male suffrage
	4 September 1870	Proclamation of the 3rd French Republic
	14 July 1880	First Bastille Day

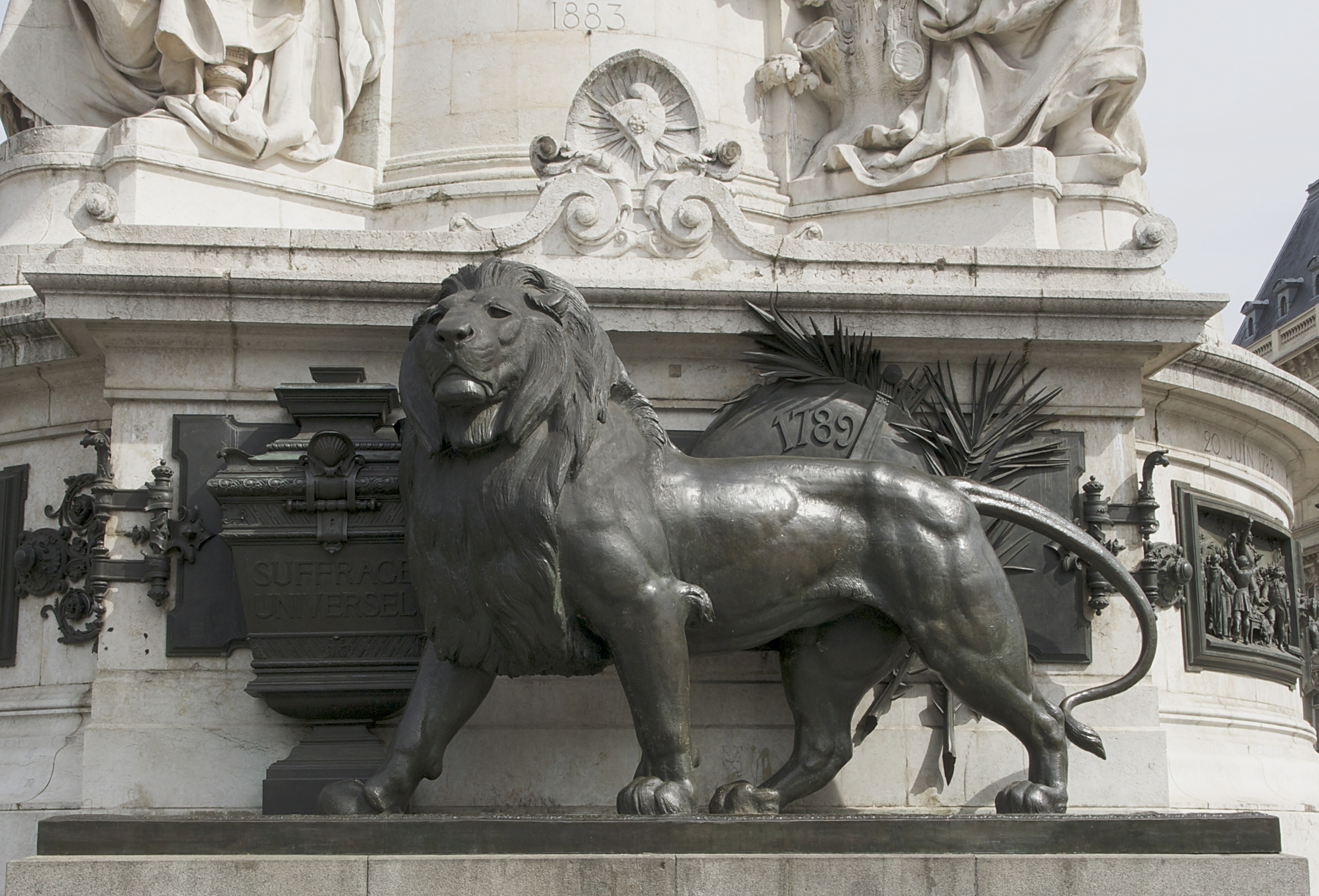
The lion

=== Lion ===
A 3 m tall bronze lion is located at ground level beside an urn labeled "universal suffrage" (French: suffrage universel).

== Protests ==
On 10 May 1891, Pierre Martinet—founder of individualist anarchism—organized a rally to honor the victims of the Fourmies massacre, an event that had occurred on the same day as the Clichy affair nine days earlier. During the gathering, anarchists laid floral wreaths at the base of the monument.

Due to its proximity to working-class neighborhoods, the square and monument became frequent venues for protest, particularly by the French left. However, its use as a protest venue significantly increased after 2013, when the roundabout which surrounded the monument was removed and replaced by a pedestrian esplanade as part of a larger scheme to make the Place de la République more accessible to public use. The architects in charge of the plan hoped to allow Parisians to "sit on the lap of the Republic".

Protests on 17 October 2026

Since then, the monument has frequently been scaled by protesters and defaced by graffiti, necessitating regular and costly cleaning and repairs. In September 2015, a Techno Parade reveler fell to his death from the monument. In August 2016, the statue had its first comprehensive cleaning since its erection. In 2026, the municipal government of Ariel Weil proposed that the statue be fenced and surrounded by greenery in order to dissuade defacement, as part of a greater anti-graffiti campaign. The monument was again defaced by protesters during 2026 French civil unrest. On 8th October, a protester who scaled the statue fell from it and was injured. Extinction Rebellion activists climbed the Monument à la République and dressed the statue of Marianne in a giant yellow vest, which bore the words "2026, la police mutile les lycéen-nes" ("2026, the police mutilate high school students") on the front and "1961, la police noie les Algérien-nes" ("1961, the police drown Algerians") on the back, referencing the 1961 Paris massacre.

== Notes and references ==
1. It is the opposite of the representation of the Statue of Liberty by Auguste Bartholdi from the same period, which holds the torch in her right hand and has a broken chain at her feet.
2.Sometimes attributed by mistake to Jules Dalou.
3.The process in fact extends over the sessions of March 2 and March 4, where the principle of universal suffrage is accepted, then the decree is adopted on March 5.
4.It is sometimes said that it represents the abolition of slavery but this is a confusion with the decree of the Provisional Government of the 4 March 1848 that institutes the "commission pour préparer, dans le plus bref délai, l'acte d'émancipation immédiate dans toutes les colonies de la République" and named Victor Schœlcher as its president but the decree that really abolishes slavery dates from the 27 April 1848.
