= Proclamation of the abolition of the monarchy =

Replacement of the French monarchy with the First Republic (21–22 September 1792)

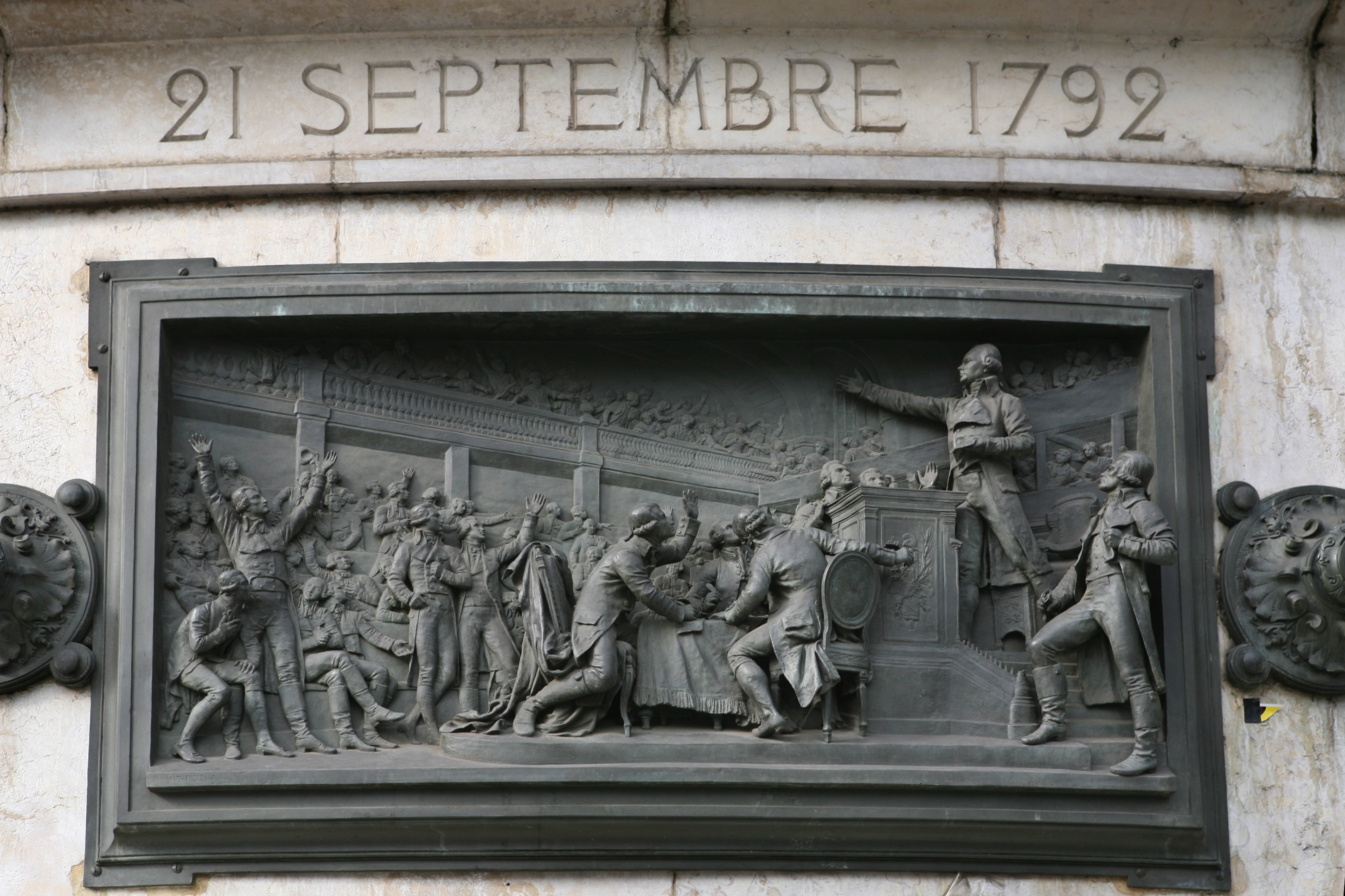
Proclamation of the abolition of the monarchy, high-relief bronze by Léopold Morice, Monument of the Republic, Place de la République, Paris, 1883

During the French Revolution, the National Convention proclaimed that it had abolished the French monarchy on 21 September 1792, giving rise to the French First Republic.

== Prelude ==
The convention's députés were instructed to put an end to the crisis that had broken out since the prevented flight to Varennes of Louis XVI in June 1791 and the bloody capture of the Tuileries Palace (10 August 1792). Their middle-class origin and their political activity meant that most of them bore no sympathy for the monarchy, and the victory at the Battle of Valmy on 20 September (the revolution's first military success) occurred on the same day as their meeting, thus confirming their convictions.

== Proposition for abolition ==
When the député for Paris, Jean-Marie Collot d'Herbois, proposed abolition he met with little resistance; at most, Claude Basire, friend of Georges Danton, tried to temper the enthusiasm, recommending a discussion before any decision. However, Abbé Henri Grégoire, constitutional bishop of Blois, replied strongly to any suggestion of discussion:

What need do we have of discussion when everyone is in agreement? Kings are as much monsters in the moral order as in the physical order. The Courts are a workshop for crime, the foyer for corruption and the den of tyrants. The history of kings is the martyrology of nations!

Jean-François Ducos supported him in affirming that any discussion would be useless "after the lights spread by 10 August". The summary argument served as a debate and the decision taken was unanimous, giving birth to the French First Republic.

== End of an era ==
In the wake of the proclamation, efforts grew to eliminate the vestiges of the Ancien régime. As the date of the Republic's first anniversary approached, the Convention passed a set of laws replacing many familiar ancien systems of order and measurement, including the old Christian calendar. This dramatic change was powerful encouragement to the growing wave of anticlericalism which sought a dechristianisation of France. The new French Republican Calendar discarded all Christian reference points and calculated time from the Republic's first full day after the monarchy, 22 September 1792, the first day of Year I.
