= Léopold Morice =

French sculptor

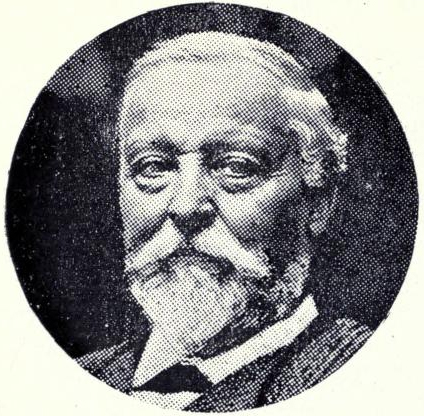
Léopold Morice

Léopold Morice (French pronunciation: [leɔpɔl(d) mɔʁis]; Nîmes, 9 July 1843 - Paris, 30 June 1919) was a French sculptor.

== Life ==
An apprentice in Auguste Bosc's studio then in François Jouffroy's studio, he was later admitted to the École nationale supérieure des beaux-arts aged 19. His talent gained him several medals during his training there. He won several contracts in 1875 in Paris, Dunkerque, Nîmes, Pompignan, at Le Vigan and in Venezuela.

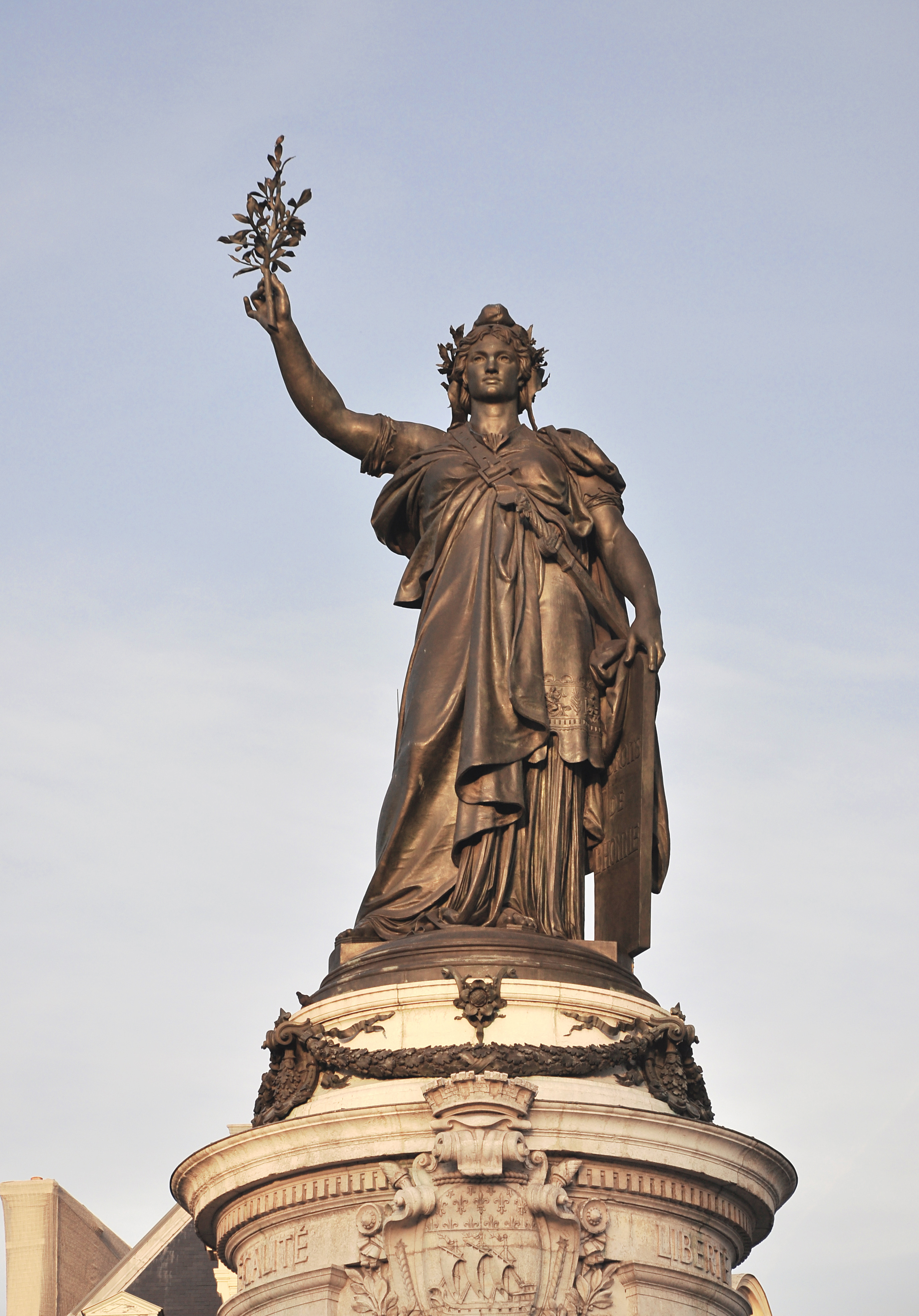
The Monument à la République, a statue of Marianne.

One of his most notable works is the statue of Marianne in Place de la République in Paris, on a pedestal by his brother, the architect François-Charles Morice (1848–1908).

In 1910 and 1911 he produced two monuments in memory of Louis-Joseph de Montcalm, one at Montcalm's birthplace of Vestric-et-Candiac (Cantal) and the other in Québec, where Montcalm died. In writing of these monuments, Georges Bellerive stated:

Monsieur Morice's work is all inspiration and [holds] a place in the first rank of French sculptors. His very personal art gives an experienced sensation that sometimes reaches the sublime. Besides talent, he also has a rare suppleness, for from the same chisel come grandly epic scenes as well as gracious and exquisite compositions.

Morice was made a Chevalier dans l'Ordre de la Legion d'Honneur in 1888.

In his lifetime, Morice taught many aspiring artists. One of his most prized students was Jules Edouard Roiné.
