= Place de la République =

Square in Paris, France

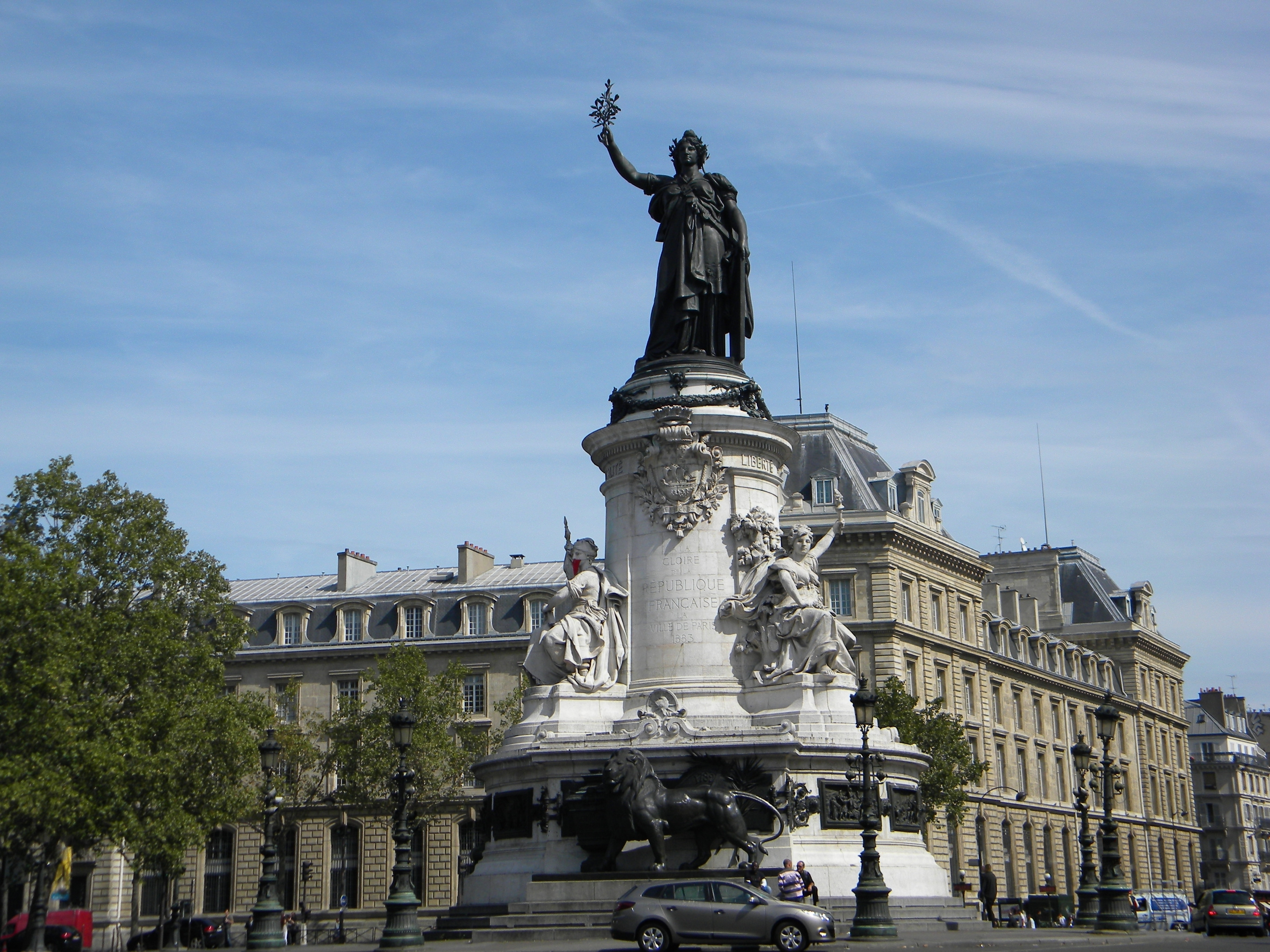
- Monument à la République at the centre of the square, topped by a statue of Marianne

- Location within Paris
- Length: 283 m (928 ft)
- Width: 119 m (390 ft)
- Arrondissement: 3rd, 10th, 11th
- Quarter: Arts-et-Métiers; Enfants-Rouges; Porte-Saint-Martin; Folie-Méricourt
- Coordinates: 48°52′02.20″N 2°21′50.60″E
- From: Boulevard du Temple
- To: Boulevard Saint-Martin

Construction
- Denomination: 7 May 1879

The Place de la République (French pronunciation: [plas d(ə) la ʁepyblik]; English: Republic Square; known until 1879 as the Place du Château d'Eau, [plas dy ʃɑto do]) is a square in Paris, located on the border between the 3rd, 10th and 11th arrondissements. The square has an area of 3.4 ha (8.4 acres). Named after the First, Second and Third Republics, it contains a monument, the Monument à la République, which includes a statue of the personification of France, Marianne.

The Métro station of République lies beneath the square, served by Line 3, Line 5, Line 8, Line 9 and Line 11. It is one of the network's main transfer points on the Rive Droite.

== History ==
=== Construction ===
The square was originally called the Place du Château d'Eau, named after a huge fountain designed by Pierre-Simon Girard and built on the site in 1811. Émile de La Bédollière wrote that the water came from la Villette and that the fountain was "superb" in character. In 1867, Gabriel Davioud built a more impressive fountain in the square, which (like the first fountain) was decorated with lions. The square took its current shape as part of Baron Haussmann's vast renovation of Paris. Haussmann also built new barracks on the cities, to garrison troops useful in times of civil unrest.

=== Renovation ===
Paris mayor Bertrand Delanoë made a renovation of the Place de la République one of his campaign promises in the 2008 campaign for re-election. The project involved the transformation of the square from a "glorified roundabout" into a pedestrian zone, with 70% of the square's 3.4 hectares and surroundings roads being reserved for pedestrians. The Paris City Council allocated twelve million euros for renovating the square in 2010, and the project began the same year. The project was completed in 2013. The total cost of the project was 20.4 million GBP, about 5 million GBP over budget. The renovation was a finalist for the European Prize for Urban Public Space. The pedestrian area now occupies "some two hectares in the sunniest part on the north-eastern side" while the "other third, to be used by vehicular traffic, is the shadier part on the south-western side." The statue of Marianne was cleaned of graffiti and footprints as part of the renovations.

=== Demonstrations ===
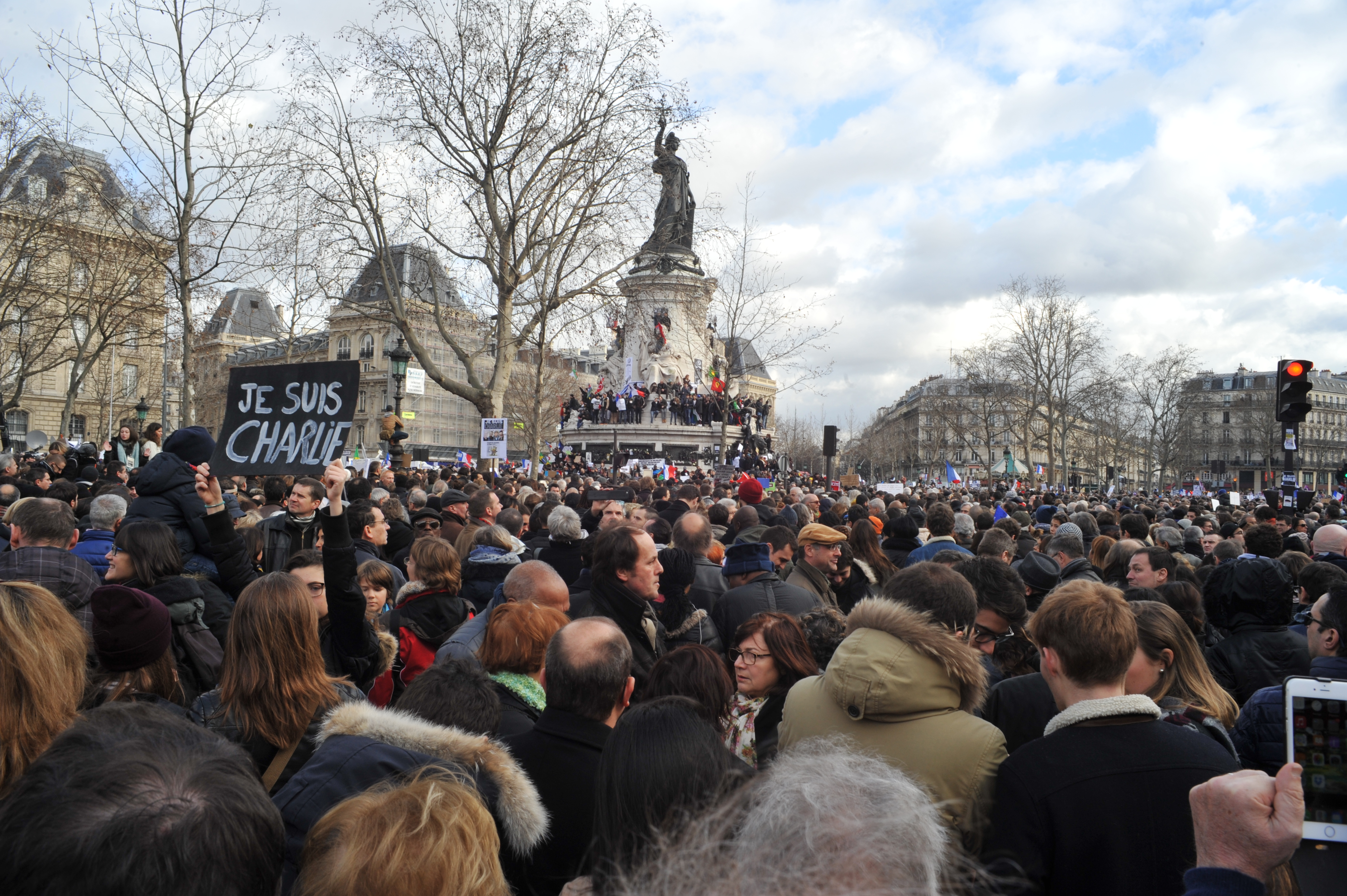
Demonstrators at the Place de la République, 11 January 2015

After terrorist attacks against France in January 2015, crowds gathered in the square to mourn and express solidarity against the threat of Islamic extremism. The French Interior Ministry estimated that as many as 1.6 million people participated, making it the largest demonstration in modern French history. Crowds again rallied on the Place de la République following the November 2015 Paris attacks.

In 2016, the Nuit debout movement, which opposed the labour reforms of the El Khomri law, began from an occupation of the Place de la République. In April 2019, Yellow Vest demonstrators clashed with authorities in the square in their 23rd week of protests and dissatisfaction over President Macron's government, the weekend following the Notre-Dame de Paris fire.

== Monument à la République ==
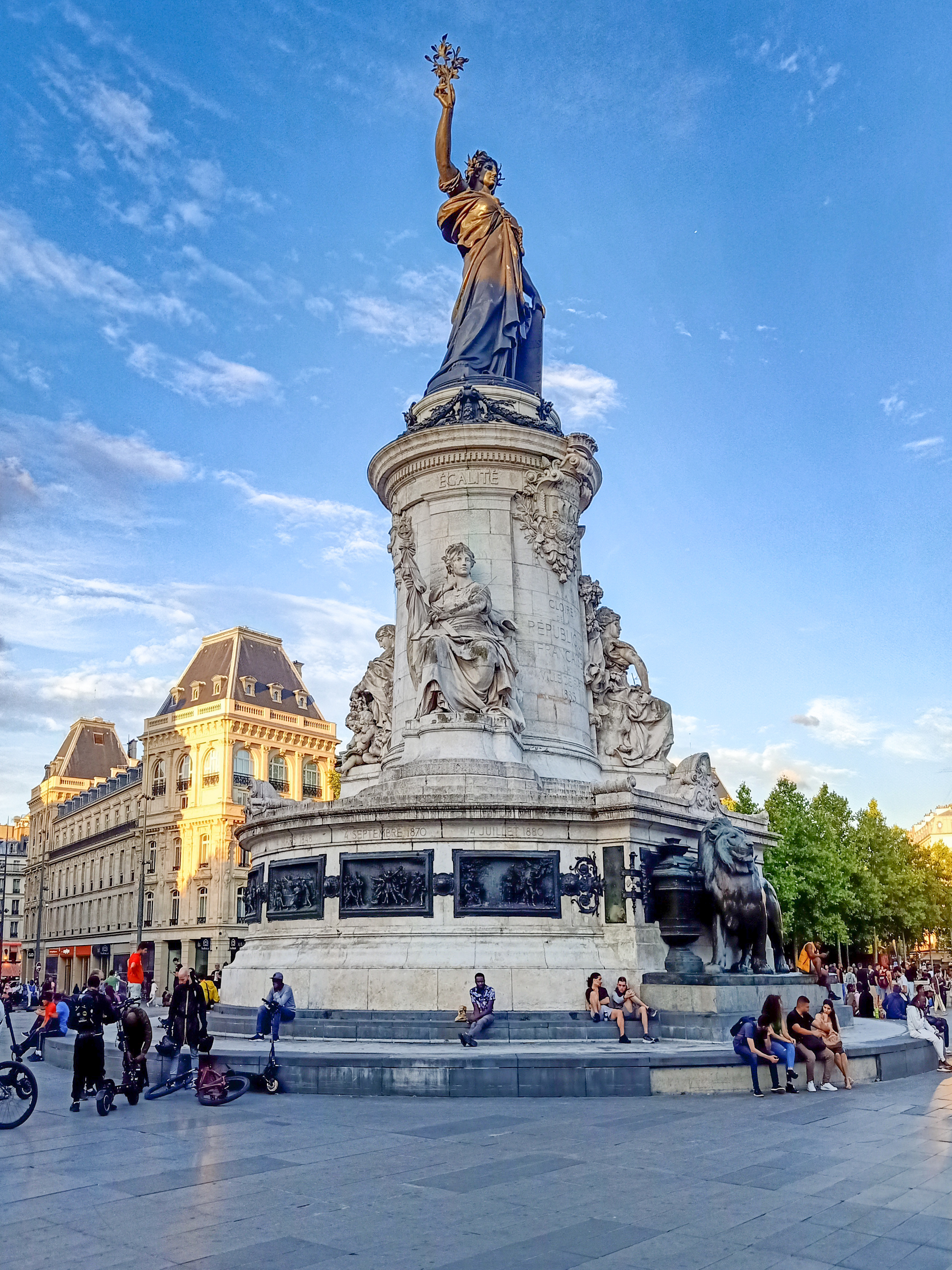
Monument à la République in 2022

At the center of the Place de la République is a 31 feet (9.4 m) bronze statue of Marianne, the personification of the French Republic, "holding aloft an olive branch in her right hand and resting her left on a tablet engraved with Droits de l'homme (the Declaration of the Rights of Man and of the Citizen)." The statue sits atop a monument, the Monument à la République, which is 75 feet (23 m) high. Marianne is surrounded with three statues personifying liberty, equality, and fraternity, the values of the French Republic. These statues also evoke the three medieval theological virtues. Also at the base is a lion guarding a depiction of a ballot box. The monument has been described as "an ordinary one, acceptable to a committee in the 1880s and inoffensively unarresting today."

The monument was created by the brothers Charles and Léopold Morice. Leopold executed the sculptural segments, while Charles executed the architectural segments. The monument was chosen as part of an art competition announced in early 1879 by the Paris City Council, which sought to create a "Monument to the French Republic" in honor of the 90th anniversary of the French Revolution, to be erected on the Place de la République. The Morice statue was chosen by the jury, but a "vociferous minority opinion among jury members claimed precedence for the second prize", the submission of Jules Dalou, who had just returned from exile in England. Dalou's statue, which was completely different in style, impressed the jury so much that it was decided in early 1880 to erect his monument to the Republic on the adjacent Place de la Nation. Two inauguration ceremonies for the Morice monument took place, the first on 14 July 1880 with a gypsum model, and the second on 14 July 1883 with the final version in bronze. The monument replaced the second fountain.

== Un détail imprévu ==
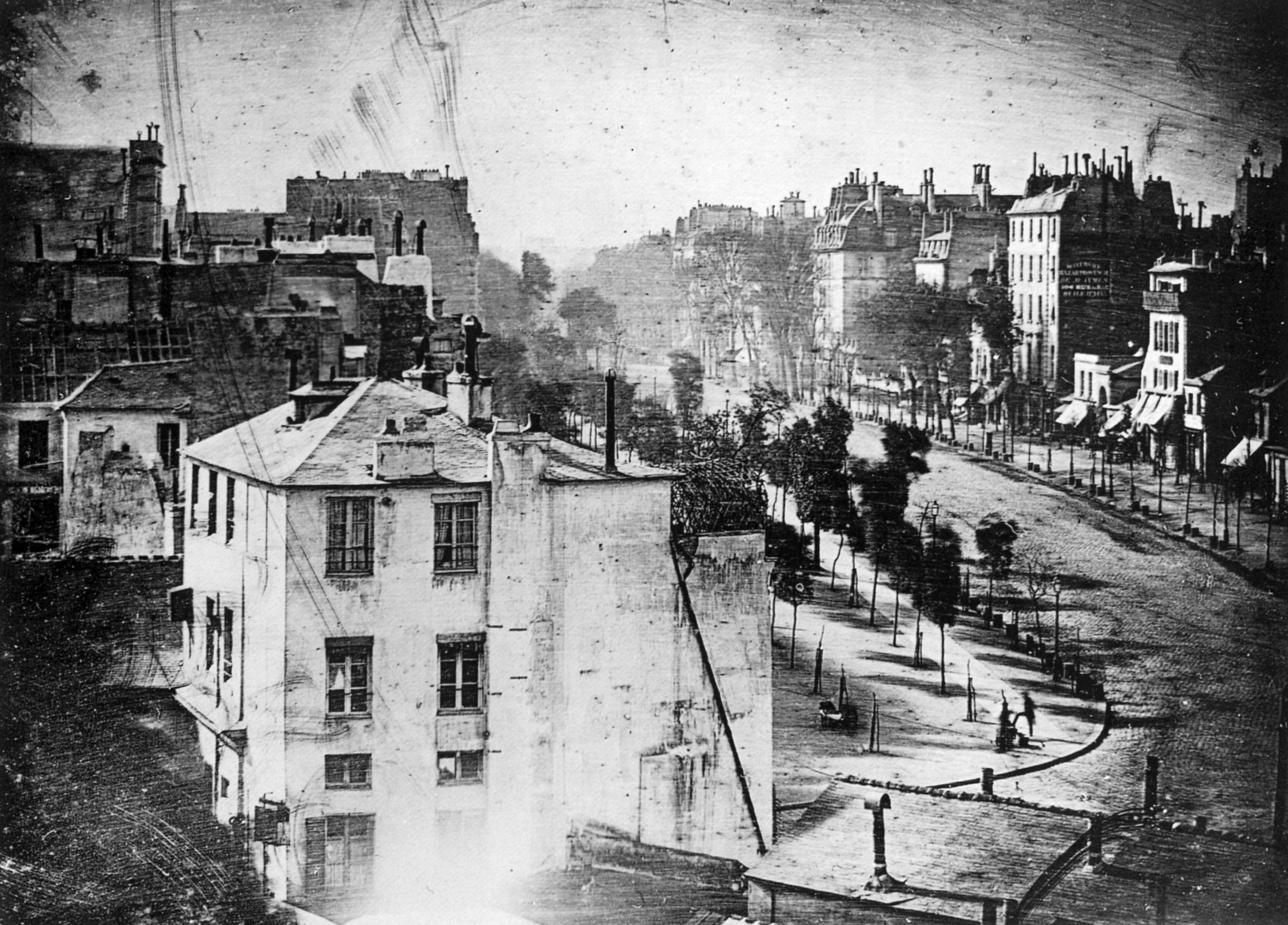
Louis Daguerre's photograph, reversed to show actual orientation

On 15 October 2026, a memorial plaque was unveiled on Place de la République next to the existing monument commemorating Louis Daguerre's 1838 (or 1837) photograph Boulevard du Temple, widely regarded as the first photograph to show human beings: a shoeshiner and their customer who stood still long enough to be captured during the long exposure time. The plaque made by Brut de Fonte foundry is named « Un détail imprévu » (An unexpected detail) and is located at precisely the location the two people were at in 1838. The location was reconstructed by the three Swedish filmmakers Maximilien Van Aertryck, Axel Danielson and Kalle Boman using analysis of the image's perspective, 3D models and old maps and plans of the area.

== Métro station ==
The Place de la République is:

Located near the Metro station: République.

It is served by Lines 3, 5, 8, 9 and 11.

== Streets meeting at the Place de la République ==
- Boulevard de Magenta
- Rue Beaurepaire
- Rue Léon-Jouhaux
- Rue du Faubourg du Temple
- Avenue de la République
- Boulevard Voltaire
- Boulevard du Temple
- Passage du Vendôme
- Rue du Temple
- Boulevard Saint-Martin
- Rue René Boulanger

== Sources ==
- Borrus, Kathy (2012). Five Hundred Buildings of Paris. New York: Black Dog & Leventhal. ISBN 9781579128586.
- Hazan, Eric (2010). The Invention of Paris: A History in Footsteps. Translated by Fernbach, David. New York: Verso. ISBN 9781844674114.
  - Originally published: Hazan, Eric (2002). L'invention de Paris: il n'y a pas de pas perdus (in French). Paris: Seuil. ISBN 9782020540933.
- Kirkland, Stephane (2013). Paris Reborn: Napoléon III, Baron Haussmann, and the Quest to Build a Modern City. New York: St. Martin's Press. ISBN 9780312626891.
- Michalski, Sergiusz (1998). Public Monuments: Art in Political Bondage, 1870–1997. London: Reaktion. ISBN 9781861890252.
- Warner, Marina (2000) [1985]. Monuments & Maiden: The Allegory of the Female Form. Berkeley: University of California Press. ISBN 9780520227330.
