= Marianne =

Personification of the French Republic

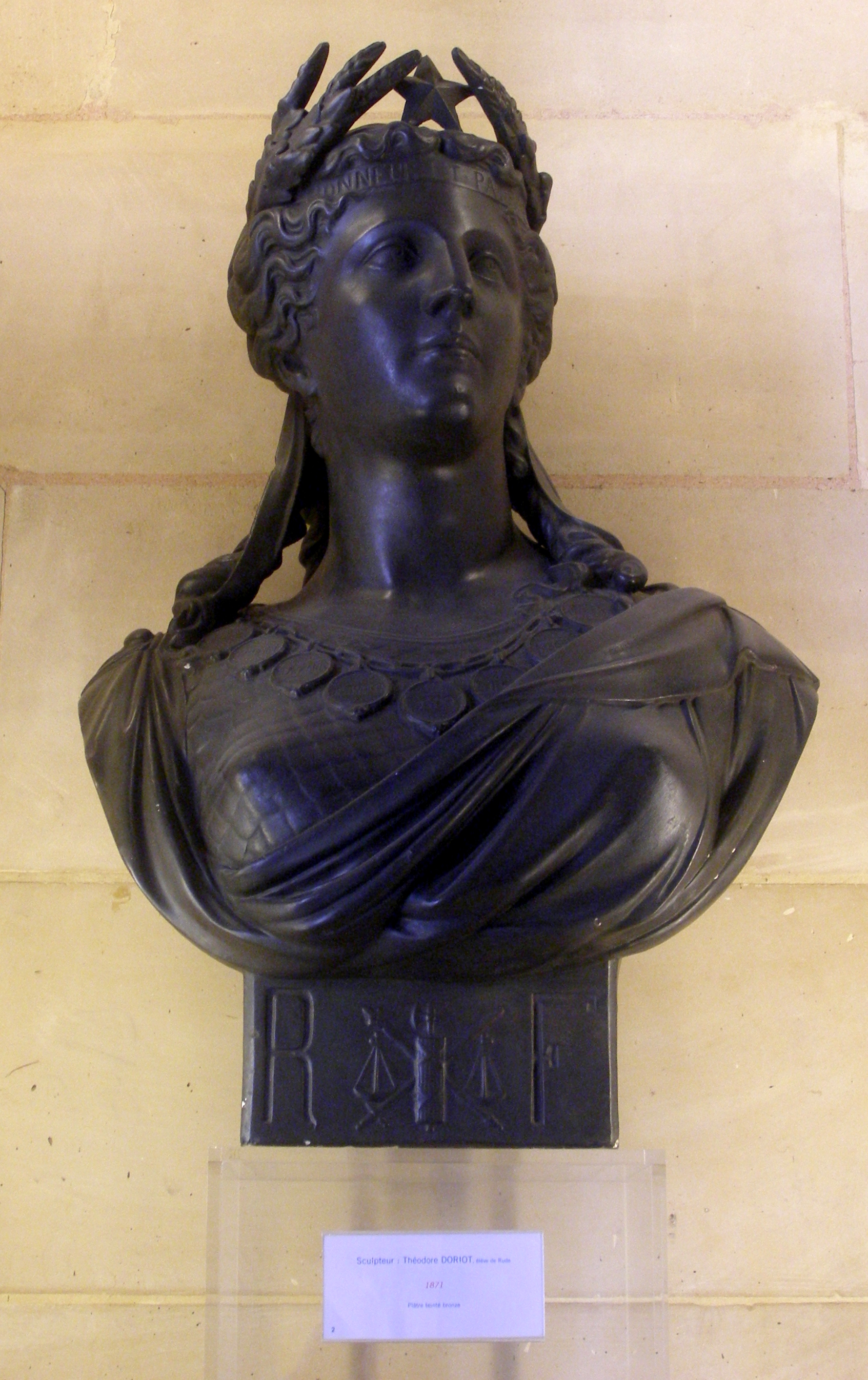
Bust of Marianne sculpted by Théodore Doriot, in the French Senate

Marianne (French pronunciation: [maʁjan]) has been the national personification of the French Republic since the French Revolution, as an emblem of liberty, equality, fraternity and reason, as well as a portrayal of the Goddess of Liberty.

Marianne is displayed in many places in France and holds a place of honour in town halls and law courts. She is depicted in the Triumph of the Republic, a bronze sculpture overlooking the Place de la Nation in Paris, as well as represented with another Parisian statue on the Place de la République. Her profile stands out on the official government logo of the country, and appears on French euro coins and on French postage stamps. She was also featured on the former franc currency and is officially used on most government documents.

Marianne is a significant republican symbol; her French monarchist equivalent is often Joan of Arc. As a national icon Marianne represents opposition to monarchy and the championship of freedom and democracy against all forms of oppression. Other national symbols of Republican France include the tricolor flag, the national motto Liberté, Égalité, Fraternité, the national anthem "La Marseillaise", the coat of arms, and the official Great Seal of France. Marianne is typically depicted wearing a cockade and a red Phrygian cap, symbolising liberty.

== History ==
20 French Centime with Marianne on Obverse.
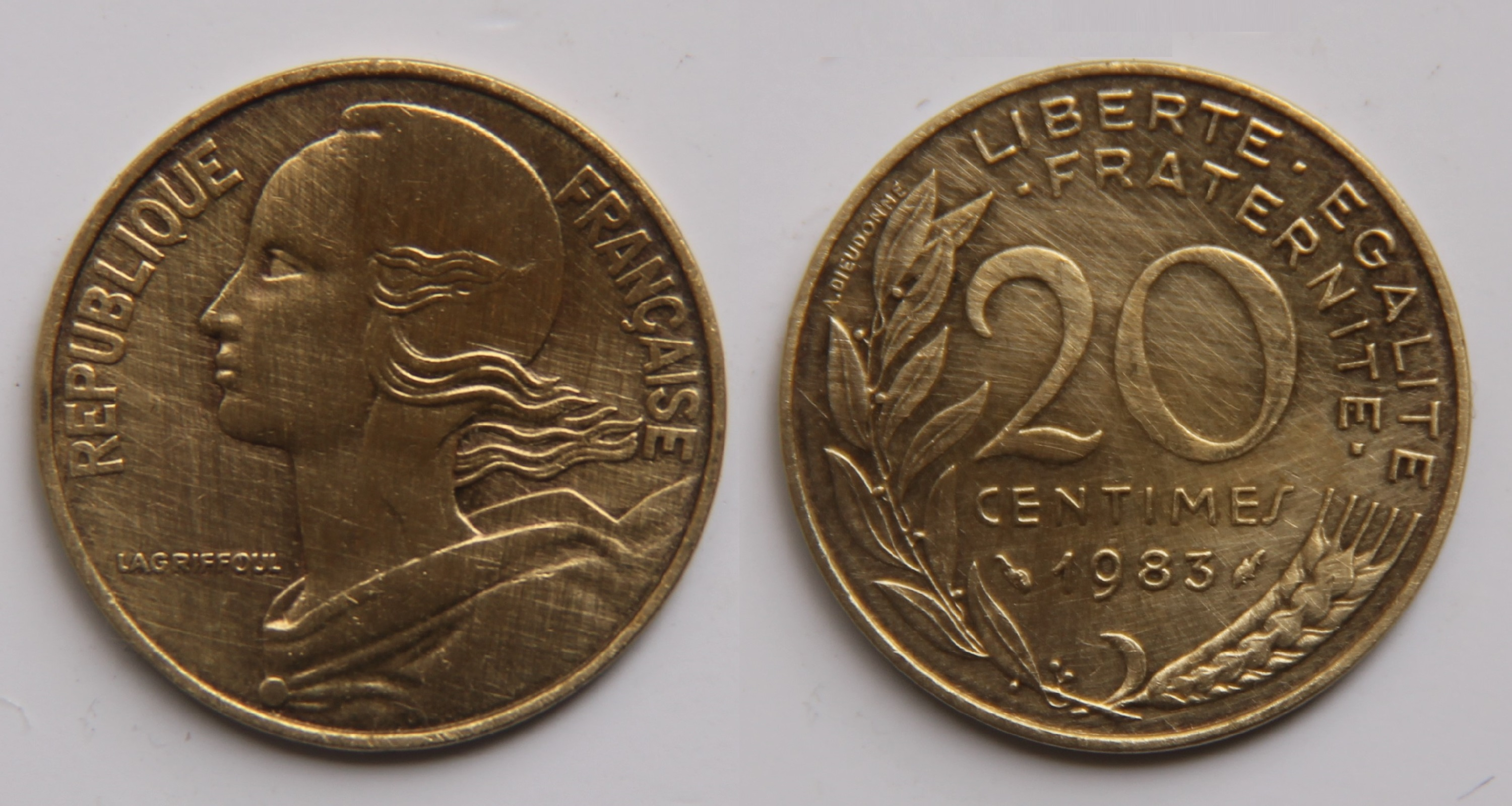
First side of the image: Obverse: Marianne wearing the Phrygian cap of liberty.
Second side of the image: Reverse: Face value and French motto: "Liberté, égalité, fraternité".
This coin was minted from 1962 to 2001.

Liberty Leading the People by Eugène Delacroix (1830), celebrates the July Revolution (Louvre Museum).

Since classical times it was common to represent ideas and abstract entities by gods, goddesses, and allegorical personifications. During the French Revolution of 1789, many allegorical personifications of 'Liberty' and 'Reason' appeared. These two figures finally merged into one: a female figure, shown either sitting or standing and accompanied by various attributes, including the cockade of France and the Phrygian cap. This woman typically symbolised Liberty, Reason, the Nation, the Homeland and the civic virtues of the Republic. In September 1792, the National Convention decided by decree that the new seal of the state would represent a standing woman holding a spear with a Phrygian cap held aloft on top of it.

Historian Maurice Agulhon, who in several works set out on a detailed investigation to discover the origins of Marianne, suggests that it is the traditions and mentality of the French that led to the use of a woman to represent the Republic. A feminine allegory was also a manner to symbolise the breaking with the old monarchy headed by kings and promote modern republican ideology. Even before the French Revolution, the Kingdom of France was embodied in masculine figures, as depicted in certain ceilings of Palace of Versailles. Furthermore, France and the Republic themselves are, in French, feminine nouns (la France, la République), as are the French nouns for liberty (Liberté) and reason (Raison).

The use of this emblem was initially unofficial and very diverse. A female allegory of Liberty and of the Republic makes an appearance in Eugène Delacroix's painting Liberty Leading the People, painted in July 1830 in honour of the Three Glorious Days (or July Revolution of 1830).

=== The First Republic ===
Although the image of Marianne did not garner significant attention until 1792, the origins of this "goddess of Liberty" date back to 1775, when Jean-Michel Moreau painted her as a young woman dressed in Roman style clothing with a Phrygian cap atop a pike held in one hand that years later would become a national symbol across France. Marianne made her first major appearance in the French spotlight on a medal in July 1789, celebrating the storming of the Bastille and other early events of the French Revolution. From this time until September 1792, the image of Marianne was overshadowed by other figures such as Mercury and Minerva. It was not until September 1792 when the French First Republic sought a new image to represent the State that her popularity began to expand. Marianne, the female allegory of Liberty, was chosen to represent the new regime of the French Republic, while remaining to symbolise liberty at the same time.

The imagery of Marianne chosen as the seal of the First French Republic depicted her standing, young and determined. It was symbolic of the First Republic itself, a newly created state that had much to prove. Marianne is clad in a classical gown. In her right hand, she wields the pike of revolution with the Phrygian cap resting on it, which represents the liberation of France. Marianne is shown leaning on a fasces, a symbol of authority. Although she is standing and holding a pike, this depiction of Marianne is "not exactly aggressive", representing the ideology of the moderate-liberal Girondins in the National Convention as they tried to move away from the "frantic violence of the revolutionary days".

Although the initial figure of Marianne from 1792 stood in a relatively conservative pose, the revolutionaries were quick to abandon that figure when it no longer suited them. By 1793, the conservative figure of Marianne had been replaced by a more violent image; that of a woman, bare-breasted and fierce of visage, often leading men into battle. The reason behind this switch stems from the shifting priorities of the Republic. Although the Marianne symbol was initially neutral in tone, the shift to radical action was in response to the beginning of the Terror, which called for militant revolutionary action against foreigners and counter-revolutionaries. As part of the tactics the administration employed, the more radical Marianne was intended to rouse the French people to action. Even this change, however, was seen to be insufficiently radical by the republicans. After the arrest of the Girondin deputies in October 1793, the Convention sought to "recast the Republic in a more radical mold", eventually using the symbol of Hercules to represent the Republic. The use of increasingly radical images to symbolise the Republic was in direct parallel to the beginning of the violence that came to be known as the Reign of Terror.

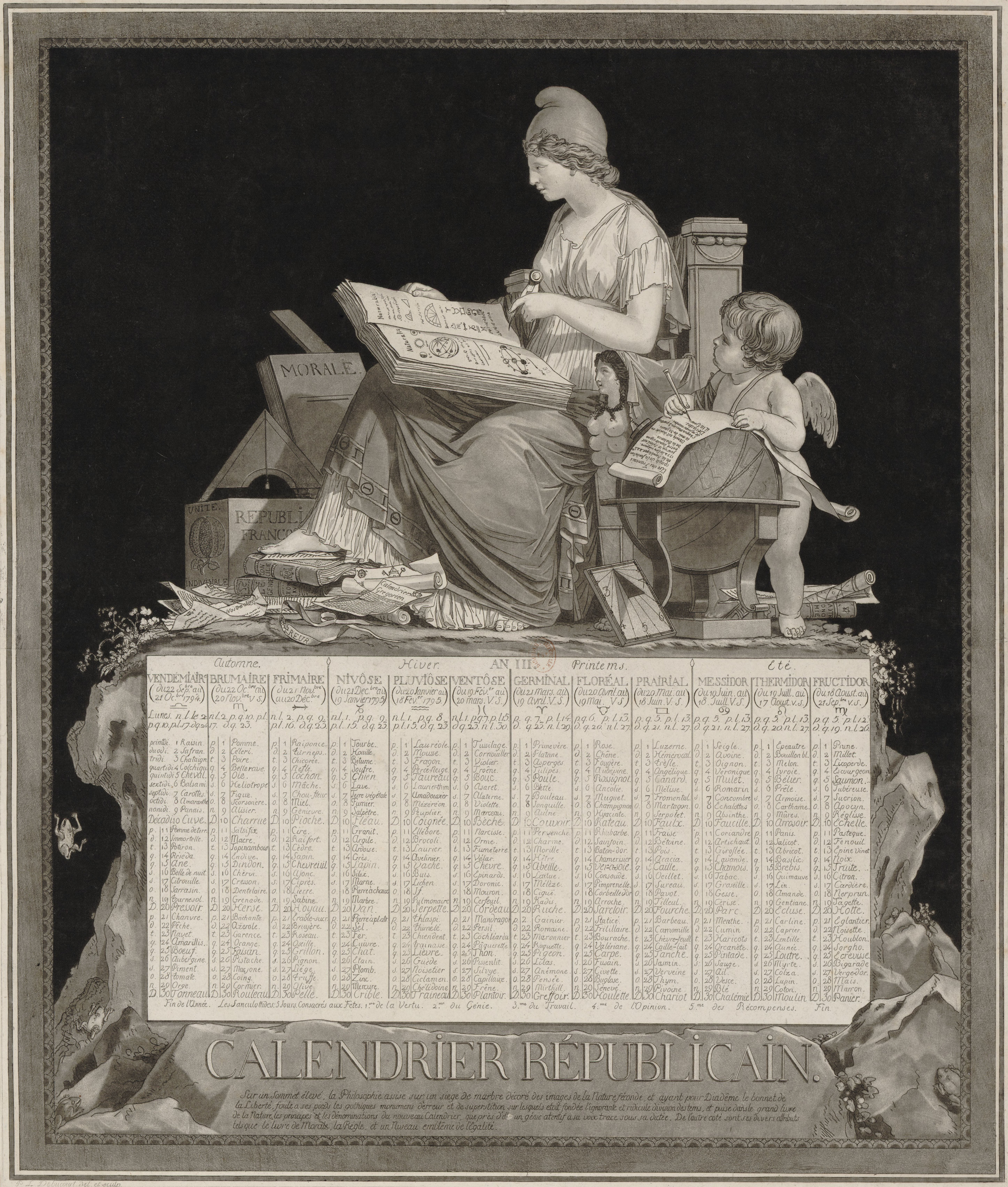
Marianne on a poster, the Year III of the Republic

After the Reign of Terror, there was a need for another change in the imagery, to showcase the more civil and nonviolent nature of the Directory. In the Official Vignette of the Executive Directory, 1798, Marianne made a return, still depicted wearing the Phrygian cap, but now surrounded by different symbols. In contrast to the Marianne of 1792, this Marianne "holds no pike or lance", and leans "languorously" on the tablet of the Constitution of Year III. Instead of looking straight at the observer, she casts her gaze towards the side, thus appearing less confrontational. Similar imagery was used in the poster of the Republic's new calendar.

The symbol of Marianne continued to evolve in response to the needs of the State long after the Directory was dissolved in 1799 following the coup spearheaded by Emmanuel-Joseph Sieyès and Napoleon Bonaparte. Whereas Mercury and Minerva and other symbolic figures diminished in prominence over the course of French history, Marianne endured because of her abstraction and impersonality. The "malleability" of what she symbolised allowed French political figures to continually manipulate her image to their specific purposes at any given time.

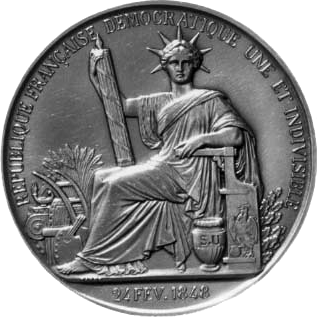
Great Seal of France (1848). The headdress of the Republic is identical to that of the 1886 Statue of Liberty (Liberty Enlightening the World). Both are prominent republican symbols.

=== The Second Republic ===
On 17 March 1848, the Ministry of the Interior of the newly founded Second Republic launched a contest to symbolise the Republic on paintings, sculptures, medals, money and seals, as no official representations of it existed. After the fall of the monarchy, the Provisional Government had declared: "The image of liberty should replace everywhere the images of corruption and shame, which have been broken in three days by the magnanimous French people." For the first time, the allegory of Marianne condensed into itself Liberty, the Republic and the Revolution.

Two "Mariannes" were authorised. One is fighting and victorious, recalling the Greek goddess Athena: she has a bare breast, the Phrygian cap and a red corsage, and has an arm lifted in a gesture of rebellion. The other is more conservative: she is rather quiet, wearing clothes in a style of Antiquity, with sun rays around her head—a transfer of the royal symbol to the Republic—and is accompanied by many symbols (wheat, a plough and the fasces of the Roman lictors). These two, rival Mariannes represent two ideas of the Republic, a bourgeois representation and a democratic and social representation – the June Days Uprising hadn't yet occurred.

Town halls voluntarily chose to have representations of Marianne, often turning her back to the church. Marianne made her first appearance on a French postage stamp in 1849.

=== The Second Empire ===
During the Second Empire (1852–1870), this depiction became clandestine and served as a symbol of protest against the regime. The common use of the name "Marianne" for the depiction of "Liberty" started around 1848/1851, becoming generalised throughout France around 1875.

=== The Third Republic ===
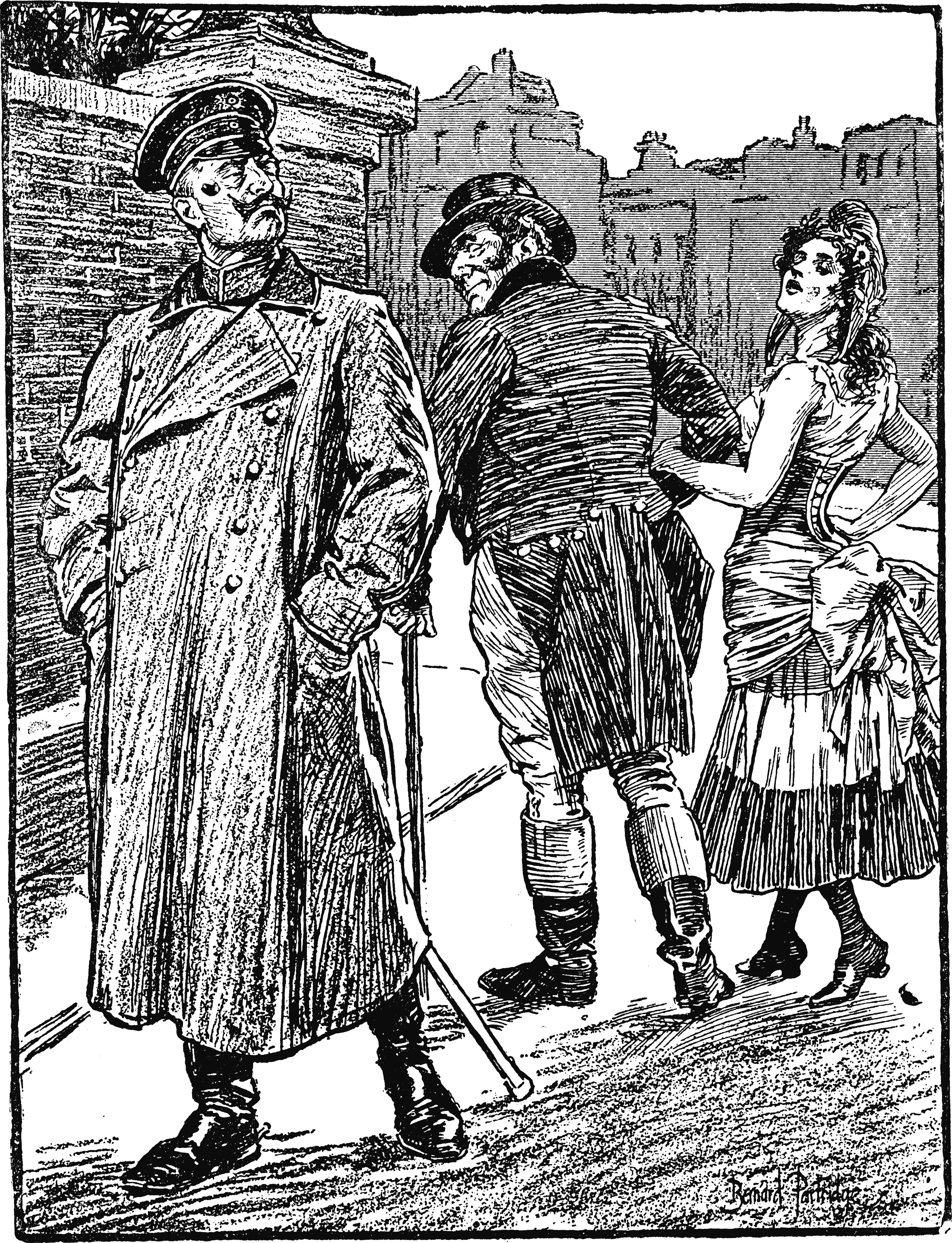
The 1904 cartoon on the Entente Cordiale from Punch by John Bernard Partridge; John Bull stalks off with a defiant Marianne and turns his back on the Kaiser, who pretends not to care.

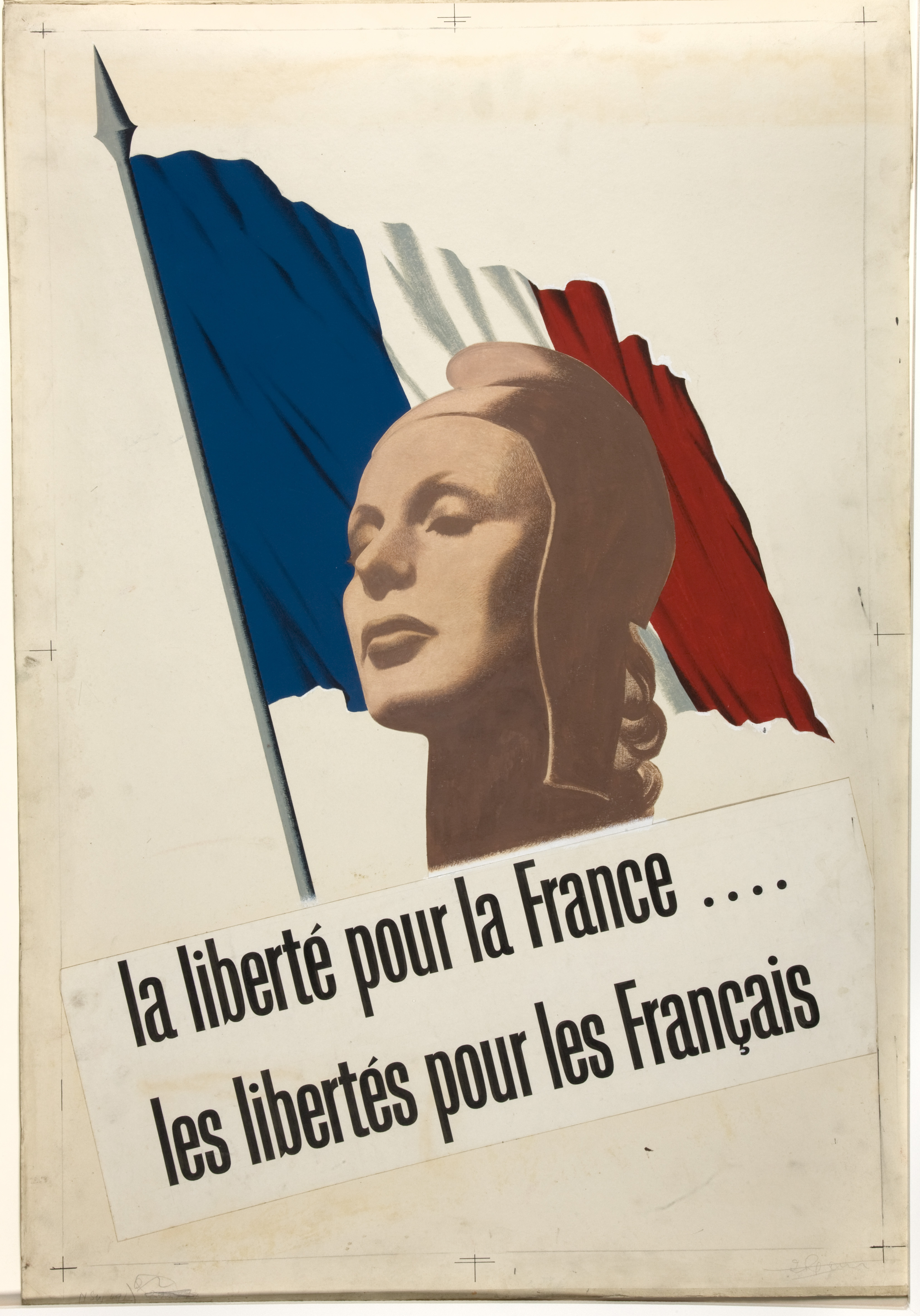
"Freedom for France, freedoms for the French" Marianne (1940)

Statues

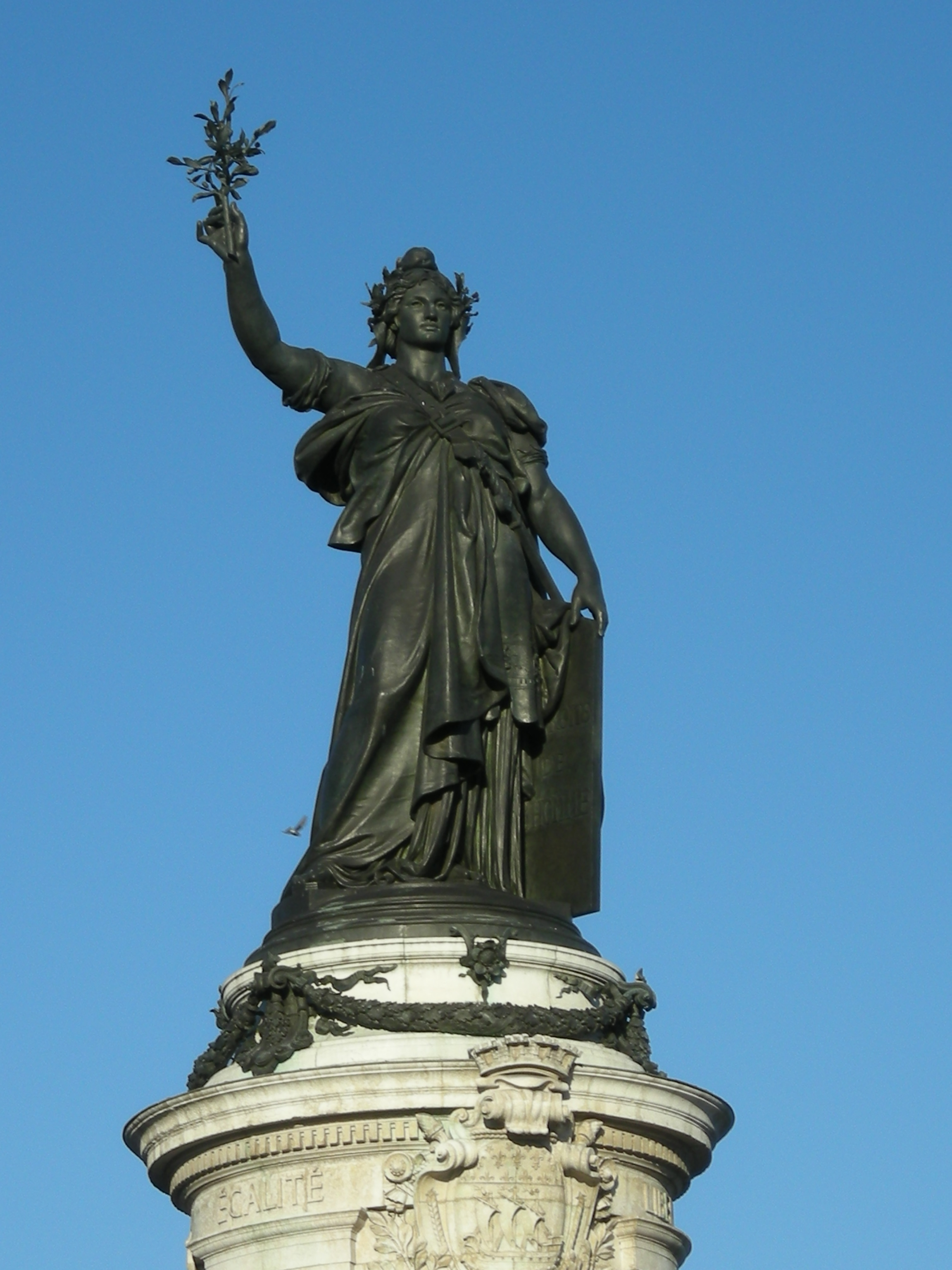
The Statue of Republic by Léopold Morice (1880), on the Place de la République, Paris

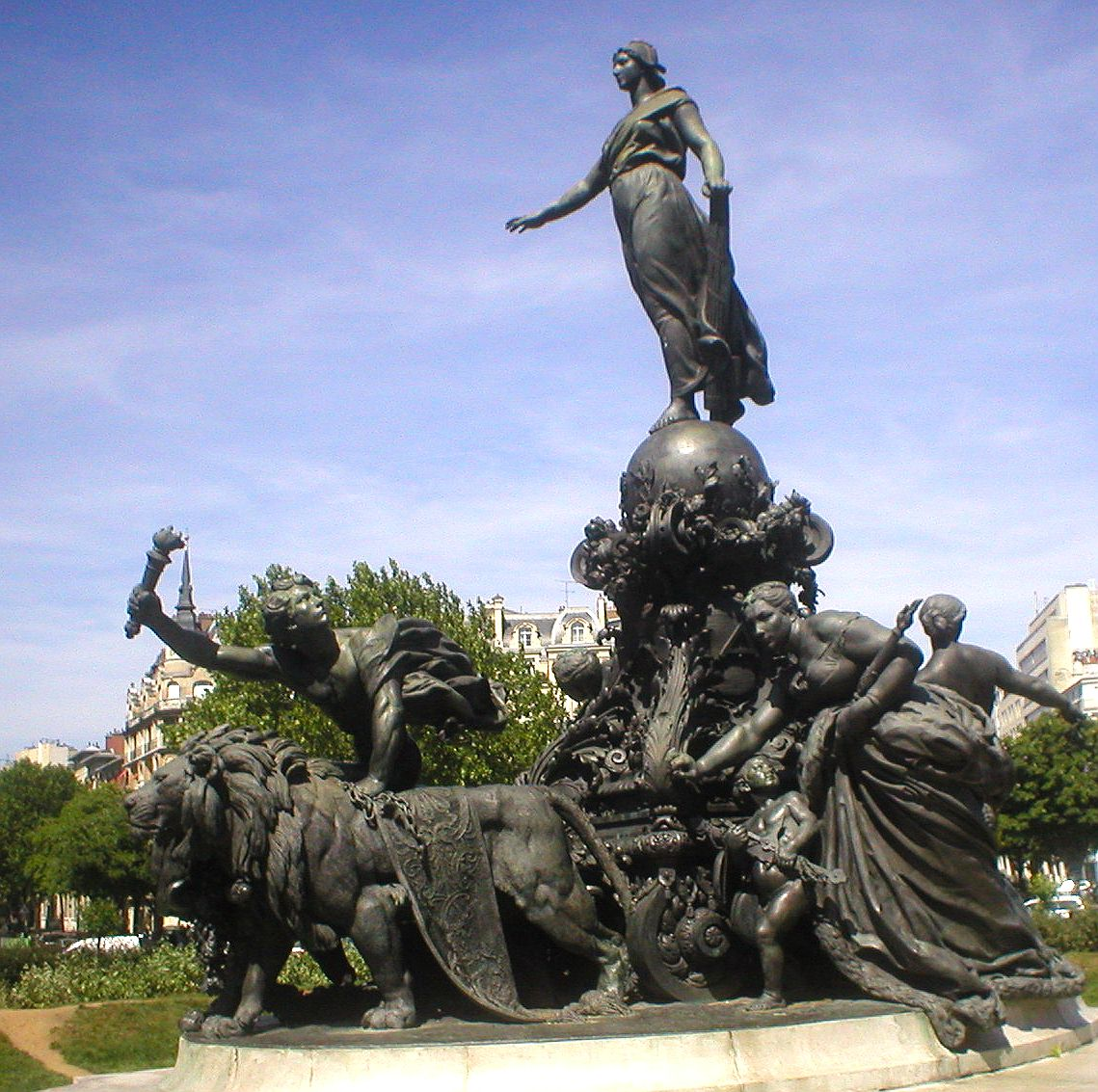
Le triomphe de la République (The Triumph of the Republic) by Aimé-Jules Dalou (1899), on the Place de la Nation, Paris

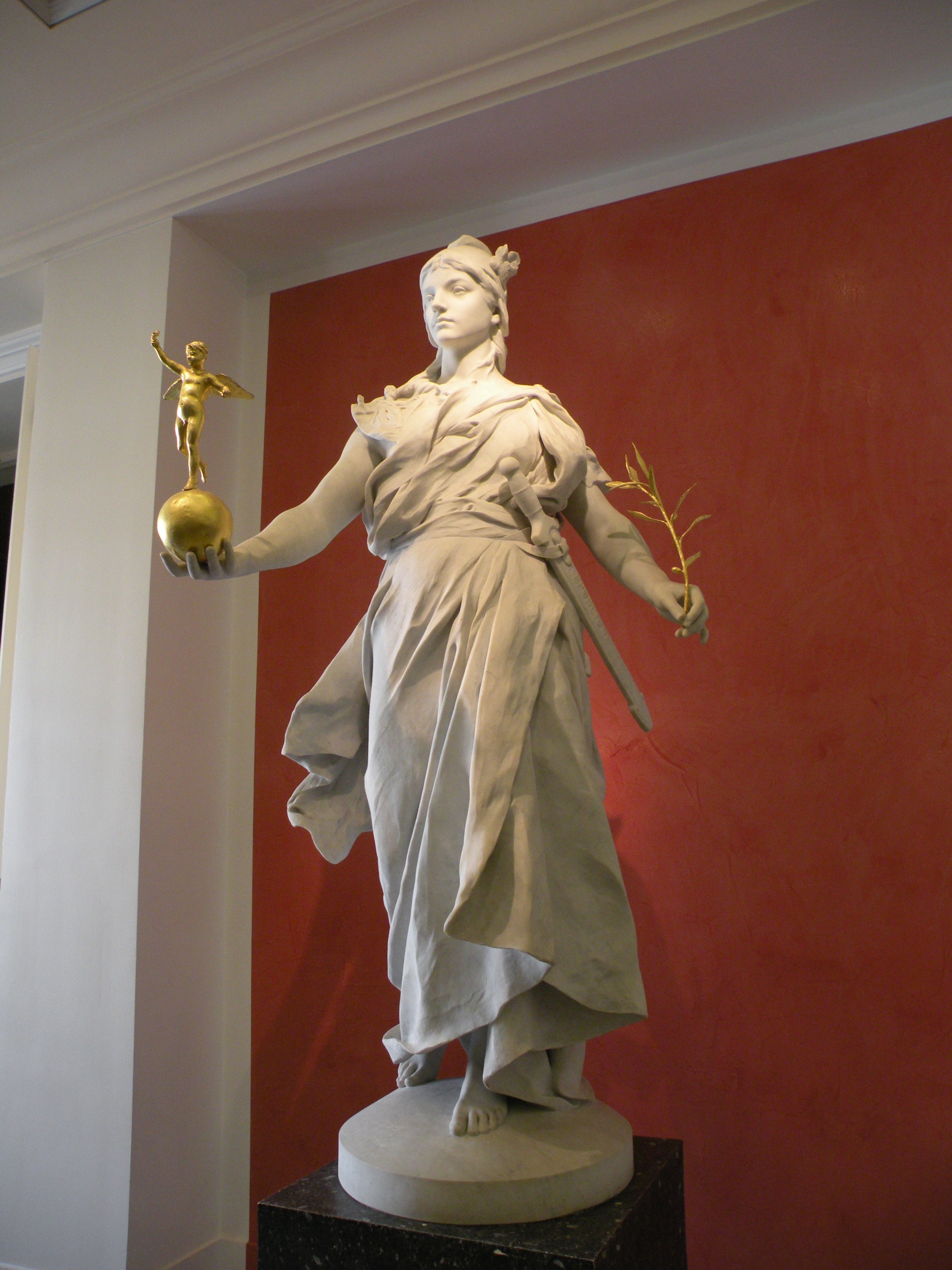
Statue of Marianne in the post office of the French Assemblée Nationale

Busts

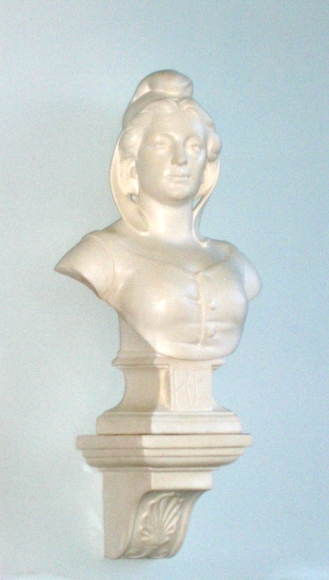
Bust of Marianne (2007)

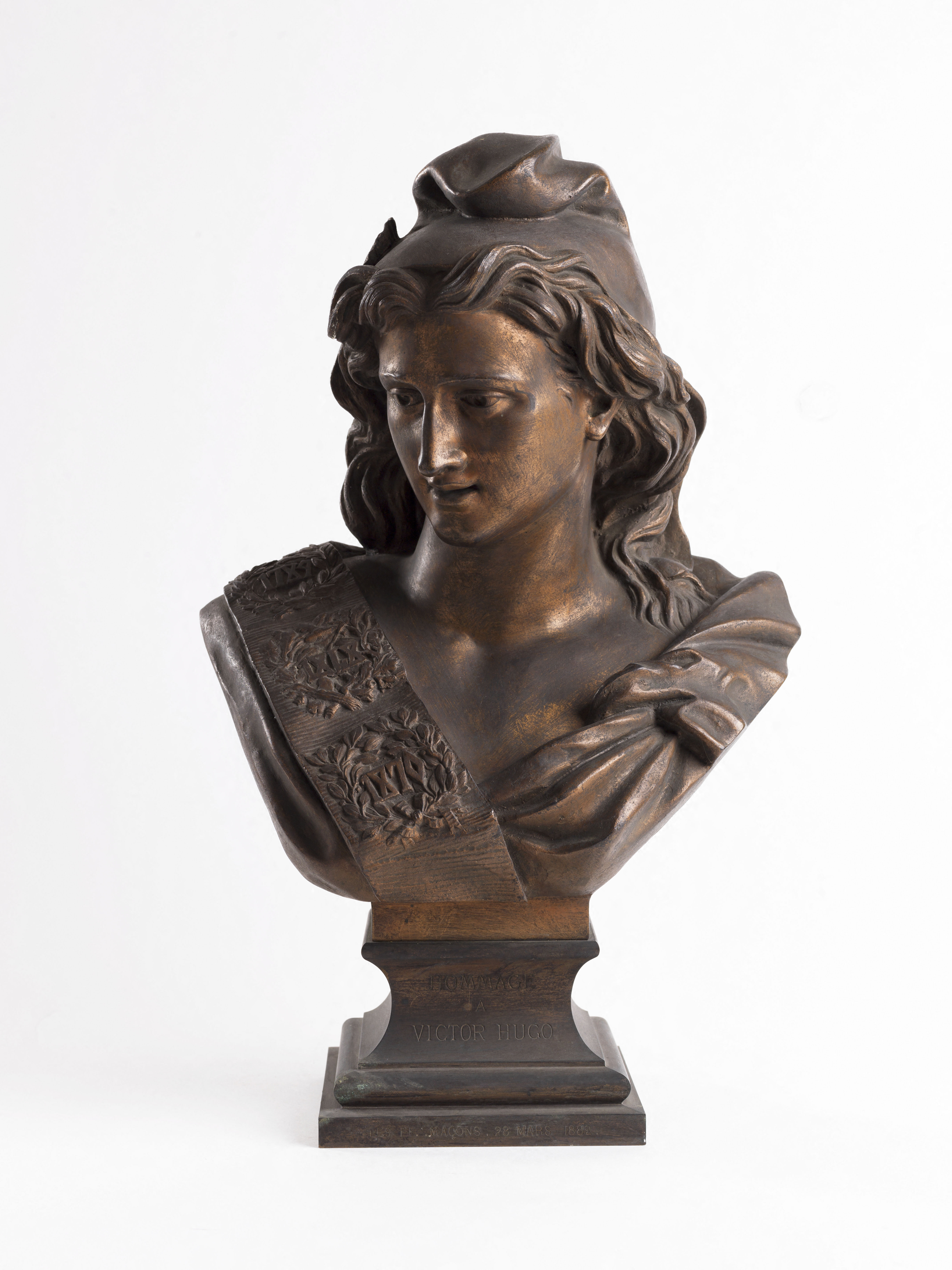
Masonic Marianne by Jacques France (1879)

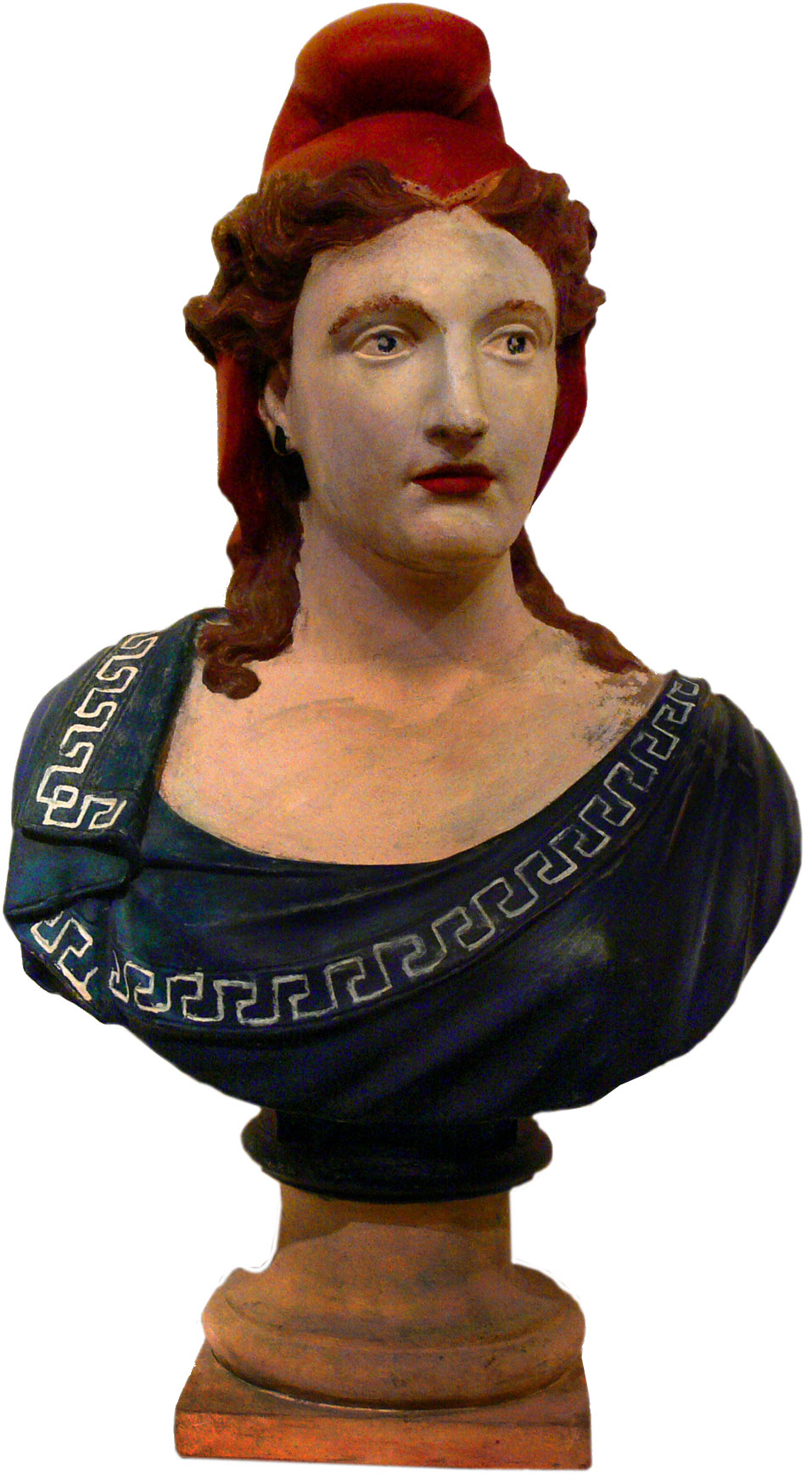
Bust of Marianne, Luxembourg Palace, seat of the French Senate. (anonymous artist)

Coins

Marianne helmeted version (Louis-Oscar Roty). Randalls Lost NYC collection

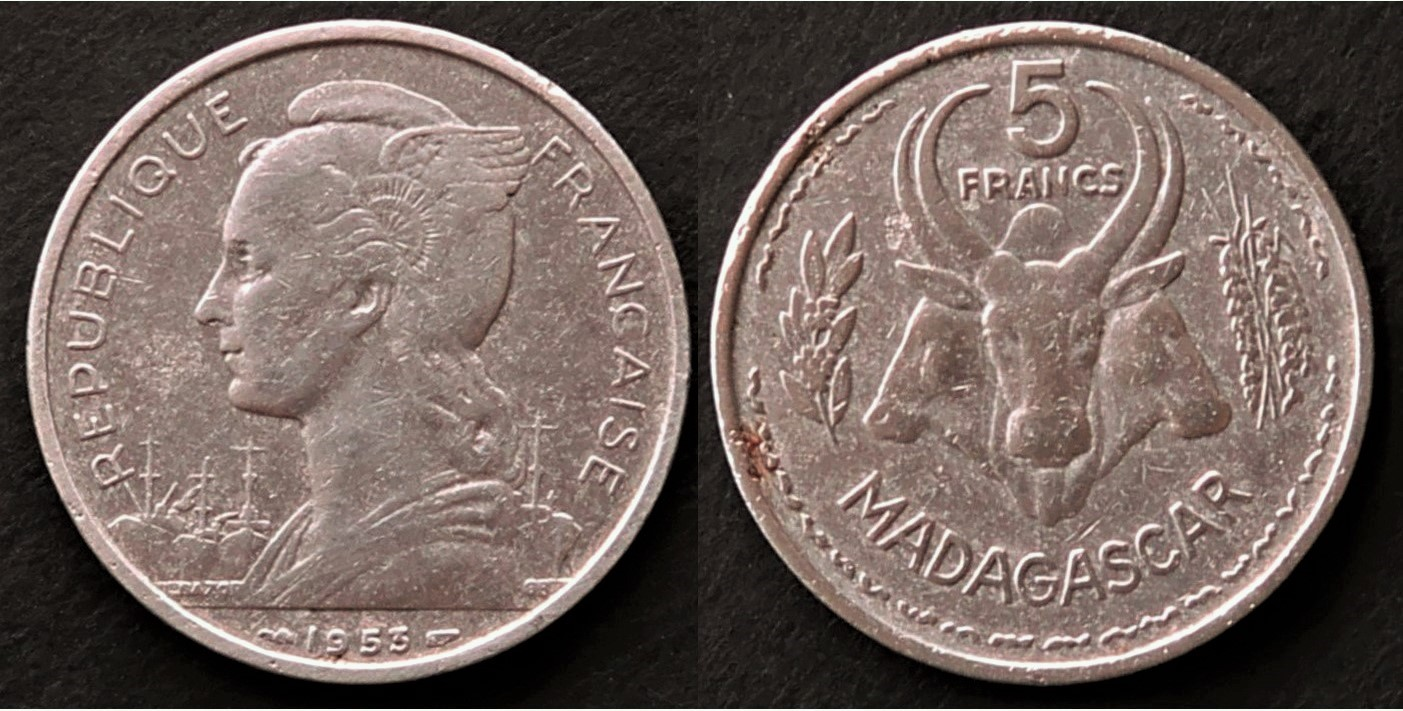
5 Malagasy franc coin displaying portrait of Marianne on obverse

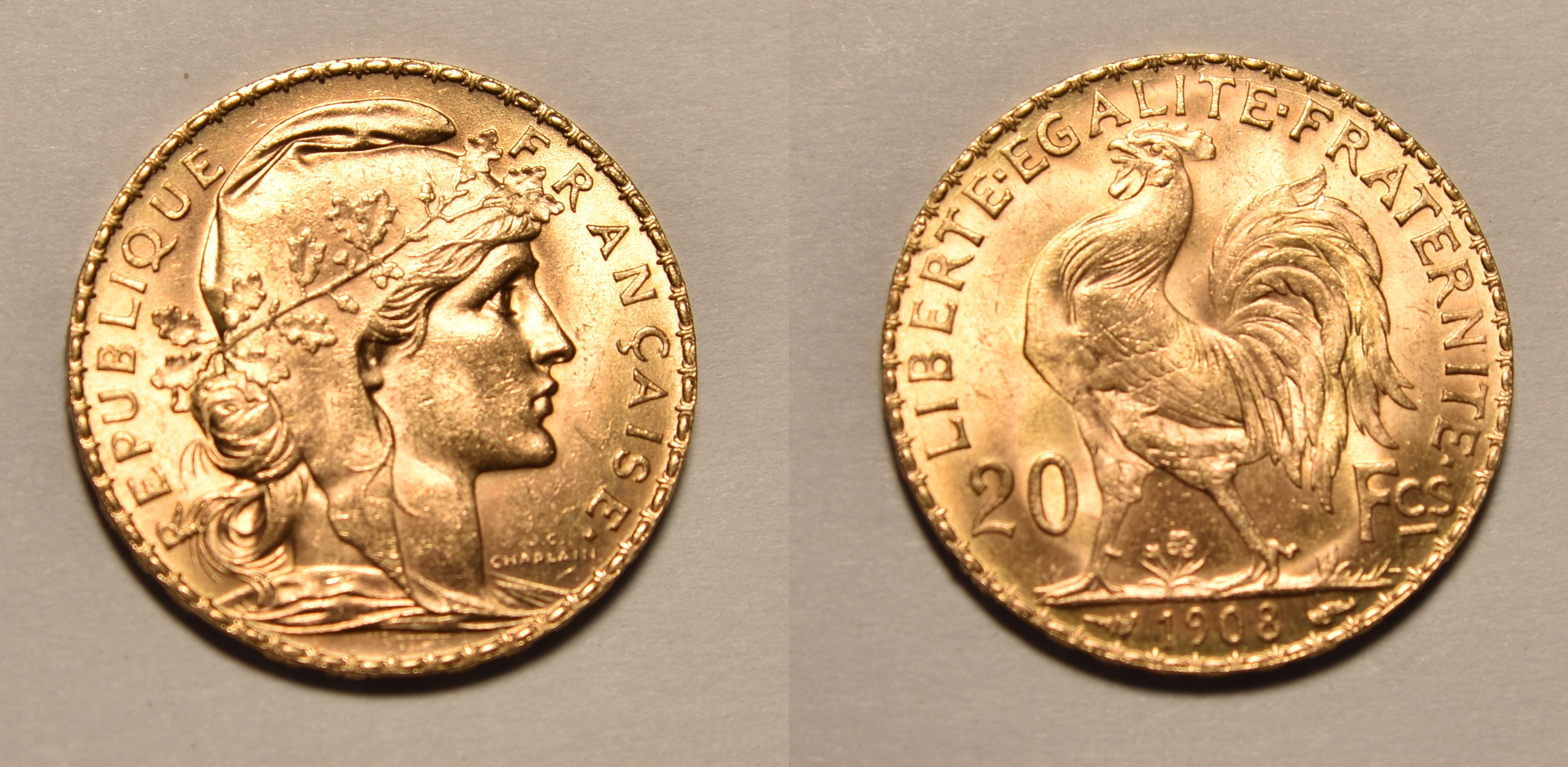
20 French franc gold coin, 1908. Marianne on obverse

The usage began to be more official during the Third Republic (1870–1940). Much of the popularity of Marianne was due to the fact that she symbolized French republicanism while at the same time being neutral enough to make her into a symbol that appealed to most people. The legacy of the French Revolution tended to divide people in France as different people in France had different revolutionary heroes and villains, and unlike the United States, the French had no cult of "the Founding Fathers" whose memory was venerated by all. For this reason, the French state tended to promote abstract symbols like Marianne as an unifying national symbol instead of using personalities from history as a national symbol in the manner which the United States used George Washington and Venezuela used Simon Bolivar as national symbols in the 19th century. As a symbol of the Revolution and of the republic, Marianne was sufficiently inoffensive enough to appeal to most people without causing any controversy. Marianne's femininity made her appear less threatening as a symbol of the republic than a male figure would have been.

After a turbulent first decade in the 1870s, by the 1880s the republic was accepted by most people in France and as such, the French state did not need history to justify itself, using Marianne as the unifying symbol of the republic. The only historical event that was regularly honored in France was Bastille Day, as the storming of the Bastille in 1789 was the revolutionary occurrence that appealed to most of the French, and the rest of the events of the revolution were not officially honored in order to keep the memory of the revolution as harmonious as possible. It was the strategy of the republican leaders to use symbols and the memory of history in such a way to create as wide a national consensus as possible in favor of the republic, which was why Marianne became such a prominent symbol of the republic. By contrast, the newly unified German Reich had too many historical traditions to draw upon, reflecting the histories of the various German states, none of which could appeal to everybody, leading to a situation where the British historian Eric Hobsbawm noted: "Like many another liberated 'people', 'Germany' was more easily defined by what it was against than in any other way." Hobsbawm argued for this reason, that unlike Marianne who was a symbol of the republic and freedom in general, her German counterpart, Deutscher Michel "...seems to have been essentially an anti-foreign image".

The Hôtel de Ville in Paris (city hall) displayed a statue of "Marianne" wearing a Phrygian cap in 1880, and was quickly followed by the other French cities. In Paris, where the Radicals had a strong presence, a contest was launched for the statue of Place de la République. It was won by the Morice brothers (with Léopold Morice producing the sculpture and the architect François-Charles Morice designing the pedestal), in 1879, with an academical Marianne, with an arm lifted towards the sky and a Phrygian cap, but with her breasts covered. Aimé-Jules Dalou lost the contest against the Morice brothers, but the City of Paris decided to build his monument on the Place de la Nation, inaugurated for the centenary of the French Revolution, in 1889, with a plaster version covered in bronze. Dalou's Marianne had the lictor's fasces, the Phrygian cap, a bare breast, and was accompanied by a Blacksmith representing Work, and allegories of Freedom, Justice, Education and Peace: all that the Republic was supposed to bring to its citizens. The final bronze monument was inaugurated in 1899, in the turmoil of the Dreyfus Affair, with Waldeck-Rousseau, a Radical, in power. The ceremony was accompanied by a huge demonstration of workers, with red flags. The government's officials, wearing black redingotes, quit the ceremony. Marianne had been reappropriated by the workers, but as the representative of the Social and Democratic Republic (la République démocratique et sociale, or simply La Sociale).

From the signing of the Entente Cordiale between France and Britain in April 1904, Marianne and John Bull personalised the agreement in a number of paintings and cartoons, most famously the Punch cartoon by John Bernard Partridge. In the struggles between ideological parties around the turn of the twentieth century, Marianne was often denigrated by right-wing presses as a prostitute. In Imperial Germany, Marianne was usually portrayed in a manner that was very vulgar, usually suggesting that she was a prostitute or at any rate widely promiscuous while at the same time being a hysterically jealous and insane woman who however always cowered in fear at the sight of a German soldier. The German state in the Imperial period promoted a very xenophobic militarism, which portrayed the Reich as forever in danger from foreigners and in need of an authoritarian government. The core of Prussian-German militarism was a cult of machismo that equated militarism with masculinity, and Marianne was used in Germany to portray France as a "weak" and "feminine" nation in contrast to "strong" and "masculine" Germany. The purpose of Marianne in German propaganda was always to promote contempt for France and with it, a warning about what Germans should not be.

The American historian Michael Nolan wrote in the "hyper-masculine world of Wilhelmine Germany" with its exaltation of militarism and masculine power, the very fact that Marianne was the symbol of the republic was used to argue that French men were effeminate and weak. In this regard, it is significant in German cartoons and posters, Marianne usually faced off against a male figure representing Germany, who was either a typical German soldier or Kaiser Wilhelm II himself and Marianne only very rarely took on Germania. In French cartoons and posters, it was Marianne who took on Wilhelm II, whose bombastic pomposity lent itself well for ridicule, and she almost never took on Deutscher Michel, leading Nolan to comment that French cartoonists missed a great chance for satire since even in Germany itself, Deutscher Michel is portrayed as rather "dim-witted". On occasion, Marianne was portrayed slightly more favorably in Germany as in a cartoon from May 1914 in the magazine Kladderadatsch where Deutscher Michel is working in his garden with a seductive and voluptuous Marianne on one side and a brutish muzhik (Russian peasant) on the other; the message of the cartoon was that France should not be allied to Russia, and would be better off allied to Germany, since Deutscher Michel with his well tended garden is clearly a better potential husband than the vodka drinking muzhik whose garden is a disorderly disaster.

Marianne differed from Uncle Sam, John Bull, and Deutscher Michel in that Marianne was not just a symbol of France, but of the republic as well. For those on the French right, who still hankered for the House of Bourbon like Action Française, Marianne was always rejected for her republican associations, and the preferred symbol of France was Joan of Arc. As Joan of Arc was devoutly Catholic, committed to serving King Charles VII, and fought for France against England, she perfectly symbolized the values of Catholicism, royalism, militarism and nationalism that were so dear for French monarchists. Joan was apparently asexual, and her chaste and virginal image stood in marked contrast to Marianne, whom Action Française depicted as a prostitute or as a "slut" to symbolize the "degeneracy" of the republic. The contrast between the asexual Joan vs. the unabashedly sexualized Marianne who was often depicted bare-breasted could not have been greater. Finally, because of Joan's status as one of France' best loved heroines, it was difficult for republicans to attack Joan without seeming unpatriotic. However, the royalist attempt to have Joan of Arc replace Marianne as the symbol of France failed, in large part because most of the French people accepted the republic, and Marianne unlike Joan was the symbol of the republic. In the middle of the 19th century, Marianne was usually portrayed in France as a young woman, but by late 19th century, Marianne was more commonly presented as a middle aged, maternal woman, reflecting the fact that the republic was dominated by a centre-right coalition of older male politicians, who disliked the image of a militant young female revolutionary. After British and German newspapers began to mock the middle-aged Marianne as a symbol of supposed French decline, around 1900 the younger Marianne came back into vogue to symbolize that the republic was not in decline.

In World War I, in German propaganda, Marianne was always depicted as dominating Russia, represented variously as a bear, a thuggish-looking Cossack or by the Emperor Nicholas II, with Marianne being drawn as an angry and emasculating wife. By contrast, John Bull was always depicted in German cartoons as dominating both Marianne and Russia, reflecting the German perception that Britain was the most dangerous of all of Germany's enemies. When John Bull was depicted in the company of Marianne in German cartoons, she was always the submissive one.

Few Mariannes were depicted in the First World War memorials, but some living models of Marianne appeared in 1936, during the government of the Popular Front as they had during the Second Republic (then stigmatized by the right-wing press as "unashamed prostitutes"). During World War II, Marianne represented Liberty against the Nazi invaders, and the Republic against the Vichy regime (see Paul Collin's representation). During Vichy, 120 of the 427 monuments of Marianne were melted, while the Milice took out its statues in town halls in 1943. Under Vichy, Marianne was banned and Joan of Arc became the official symbol of France. In French schools and government offices, the busts of Marianne were replaced with busts of Marshal Pétain. As Marianne was the symbol of the republic and everything it stood for, under Vichy Marianne was demonized as the most "offensive" symbol of the republic. There was a strong misogyny to Vichy's attacks on Marianne under Vichy's ideology there were two sorts of women; the "virgin and the whore" with Joan being cast as the former and Marianne as the latter.

=== Fifth Republic ===
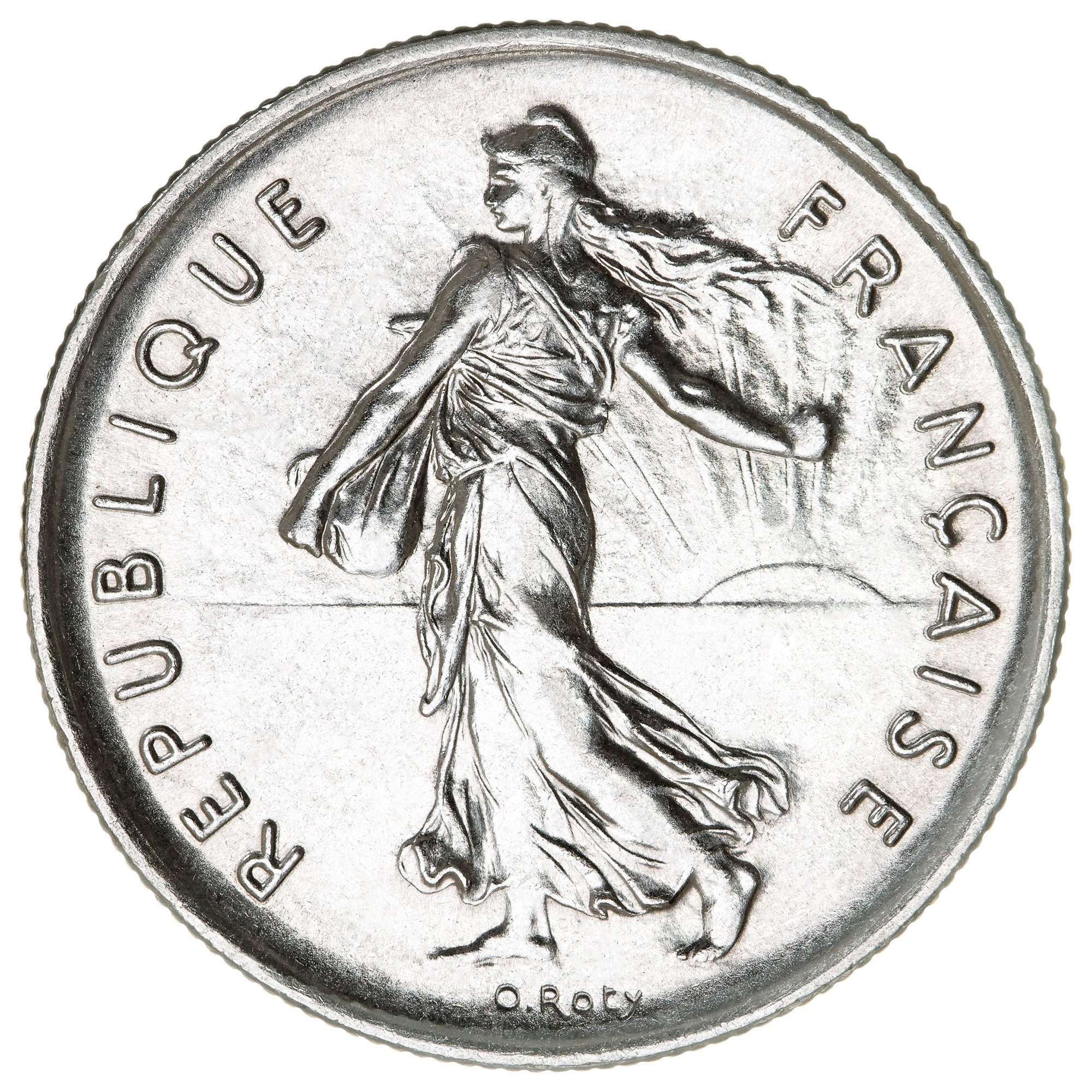
Marianne « La semeuse » on a five French francs coin (1970)

Marianne's presence became less important in French imagery after World War II, although under the presidency of Charles de Gaulle she was often used, in particular on stamps or for referendums. The most recent subversive and revolutionary appearance of Marianne was during the May 68 protests. The liberal and conservative president Valéry Giscard d'Estaing replaced Marianne by La Poste on stamps, changed the rhythm of the Marseillaise and suppressed the commemoration of 8 May 1945.

During the bicentenary of the Revolution, in 1989, Marianne hardly made any public appearance. The Socialist President François Mitterrand aimed to make the celebrations a consensual event, gathering all citizens, recalling more the Republic than the Revolution. The American opera singer Jessye Norman took Marianne's place, singing La Marseillaise as part of an elaborate pageant orchestrated by avant-garde designer Jean-Paul Goude. The Republic, after harsh internal fighting throughout the 19th century and even the 20th century (6 February 1934 crisis, Vichy, etc.), had become consensual; the vast majority of French citizens were now republicans, leading to a lesser importance of a cult of Marianne.

==== In the Islamic scarf controversy ====
Marianne has featured prominently in the Islamic scarf controversy in France as a symbol of a certain idea of Frenchness and femininity. The American historian Joan Wallach Scott wrote in 2016 that it is no accident that Marianne is often depicted as bare-breasted regardless of where she is or what she is doing, as this reflects the French ideal of a woman, which has been used as an argument for why Islamic dress for women is not French. Scott wrote the topless Marianne has become "...the embodiment of emancipated French women in contrast to the veiled woman said to be subordinated by Islam".

Later in 2016, the French Prime Minister Manuel Valls stated in a speech that the burkini swimsuit was an "enslavement" of women and that Marianne was usually topless which The Economist noted: "The implication seemed to be that women in burkinis are un-French, while true French women go topless." In a speech on 29 August 2016, Valls said: "Marianne has a naked breast because she is feeding the people! She is not veiled, because she is free! That is the republic!". Angelique Chisafis of The Guardian newspaper reported: "The inference that bare breasts were a symbol of France while the Muslim headscarf was problematic sparked scorn from politicians and derision from historians and feminists". The French president François Hollande sparked much debate in France with his controversial statement "The veiled woman will be the Marianne of tomorrow".

== Origin of the name ==
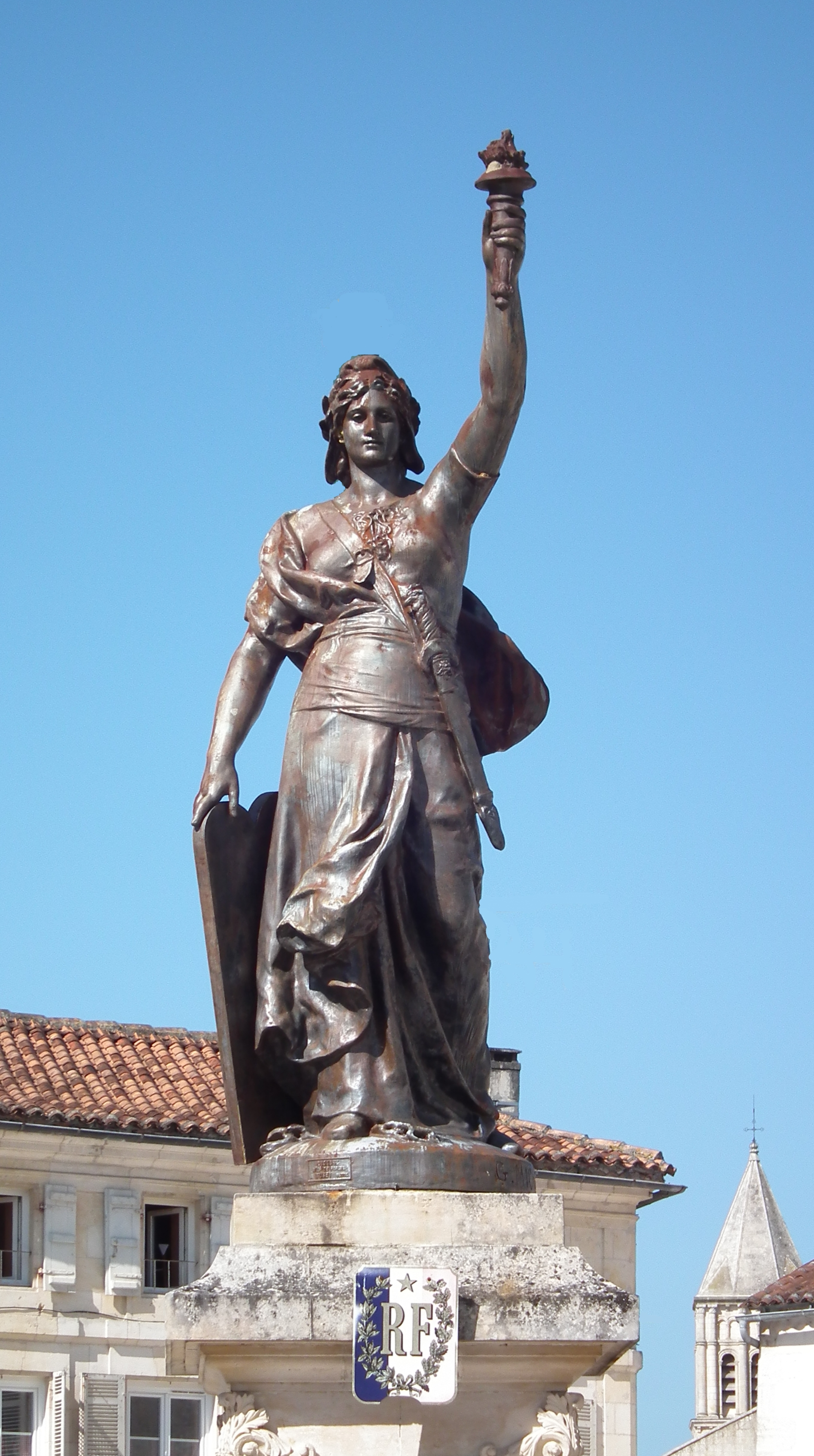
Marianne in Jonzac (1894). The sculpture is similar to Liberty Enlightening the World, commonly known as the Statue of Liberty.

At the time of the French Revolution, as the most common of people were fighting for their rights, it seemed fitting to name the Republic after the most common of French women's names: Marie (Mary) and Anne. The account made of their exploits by the Revolutionaries often contained a reference to a certain Marianne (or Marie-Anne) wearing a Phrygian cap. This pretty girl of legend inspired the revolutionaries, and looked after those wounded in the many battles across the country.

A recent discovery establishes that the first written mention of the name of Marianne to designate the Republic appeared in October 1792 in Puylaurens in the Tarn département near Toulouse. At that time people used to sing a song in the Provençal dialect of Occitan by the poet Guillaume Lavabre: "La garisou de Marianno" (French: "La guérison de Marianne"; "Marianne's recovery (from illness)"). At the time Marie-Anne was a very popular first name; according to Agulhon, it "was chosen to designate a régime that also saw itself as popular."

Some believe that the name came from the name of the Spanish Jesuit Juan de Mariana, the 16th century Monarchomach, a theoretician of tyrannicide. Others think it was the image of the wife of the politician Jean Reubell: according to an old 1797 story, Barras, one of the members of the Directoire, during an evening spent at Reubell's, asked his hostess for her name—"Marie-Anne," she replied—"Perfect," Barras exclaimed, "It is a short and simple name, which befits the Republic just as much as it does yourself, Madame."

The description by artist Honoré Daumier in 1848, as a mother nursing two children, Romulus and Remus, or by sculptor François Rude, during the July Monarchy, as a warrior voicing the Marseillaise on the Arc de Triomphe, are uncertain.

The name of Marianne also appears to be connected with several republican secret societies. During the Second Empire, one of them, whose members had sworn to overthrow the monarchy, had taken her name.

In any case, she has become a symbol in France: considered as a personification of the Republic, she was often used on republican iconography – and sometimes caricatured and reviled by those against the republic, especially royalists and monarchists.

== Models ==
The official busts of Marianne initially had anonymous features, appearing as women of the people. From 1969, however, they began to take on the features of famous women, starting with the actress Brigitte Bardot. She was followed by Michèle Morgan (1972), Mireille Mathieu (1978), Catherine Deneuve (1985), Inès de La Fressange (1989), Laetitia Casta (2000) and Évelyne Thomas (2003).

Laetitia Casta was named the symbolic representation of France's Republic in October 1999 in a vote open for the first time to the country's more than 36,000 mayors. She won from a shortlist of five candidates, scoring 36% among the 15,000 that voted. The other candidates were Estelle Hallyday, Patricia Kaas, Daniela Lumbroso, Laëtitia Milot and Nathalie Simon.

In July 2013, a new stamp featuring the Marianne was debuted by President François Hollande, allegedly designed by the team of Olivier Ciappa and David Kawena. Ciappa claimed that Inna Shevchenko, a high-profile member of the Ukrainian protest group FEMEN who had recently been granted political asylum in France, was a main inspiration for the new Marianne. However, Kawena and his attorney later claimed that Ciappa was falsely representing himself as having had any level of creative input on the artwork. Kawena further stated that Shevchenko, or any other figure that Ciappa claimed to be an inspiration, was in no way the model for the work, and has sued Ciappa for violation of copyright on the Marianne artwork. Ciappa later refuted the claims that Kawena was ignored, and also revealed his legal name ("David Kawena" being a pseudonym taken from the Lilo & Stitch films) in a retaliatory press release; Xavier Héraud, a writer for Yagg (a French LGBT news site), noted that in a 2013 Huffington Post piece by Ciappa he never refers to Kawena and claims authorship of the images within the post. Yagg later reported on a response to their posting from Ciappa where he said that he was not in editorial control of the Huffington Post piece and did not intend to have the phrasing be "My Marianne" as accused by Kawena in his suit; Yagg later contacted Huffington Post who informed them that they sent a draft for Ciappa to look at prior to publishing, which is the current version of the article.

== Government logo ==
Official logo of the French Republic

Blue-white-red, Marianne, Liberté-Égalité-Fraternité, the Republic: these national symbols represent France, as a state and its values. Since September 1999, they have been combined in a new "identifier" created by the Plural Left government of Lionel Jospin under the aegis of the French Government Information Service (SIG) and the public relations officials in the principal ministries. As a federating identifier of the government departments, it appears on a wide range of material—brochures, internal and external publications, publicity campaigns, letter headings, business cards, etc.—emanating from the government, starting with the various ministries (which are able to continue using their own logo in combination with this) and the préfectures and départements.

== Paris 2024 Olympic and Paralympic logo ==
Marianne is one of the elements of the official emblem of the 2024 Summer Olympics and the 2024 Summer Paralympics in Paris, combined with the gold medal and the Olympic and Paralympic flame, which is the first time in history with the same emblem.

== See also ==
- Columbia, an equivalent symbol for the United States of America.
- Government of France
- National personification, contains the list of personifications for various nations and territories.
- Statue of Liberty (Liberty Enlightening the World), a gift from the French people to the American people to commemorate the American Declaration of Independence.
