= Human rights in Egypt =

Human rights in Egypt are severely curtailed. Abdel Fattah el-Sisi leads an authoritarian government and, according to Human Rights Watch, "relies on naked coercion and the military and security services as his main vehicles of control". Elements of his rule have been described as even more draconian than that of prior authoritarian leader Hosni Mubarak, who was president from 1981 to 2011.

In Egypt's modern history, political freedoms have generally been restricted, with the authoritarian regimes of Hosni Mubarak (1981-2011) and el-Sisi (2014–) dominating politics. Elections took place under both authoritarian regimes but they were not free nor fair. Freedom of media, speech, and assembly have been substantially curtailed.

International human rights organizations, such as Amnesty International and Human Rights Watch (HRW), have criticized the state of human rights in Egypt. As of 2022, HRW has declared that Egypt's human rights crises under the government of President Abdel Fattah al-Sisi is "one of its worst ... in many decades", and that "tens of thousands of government critics, including journalists, peaceful activists, and human rights defenders, remain imprisoned on abusive 'terrorism' charges, many in lengthy pretrial detention." The worst mass killing in Egypt's modern history occurred on 14 August 2013 during the dispersal by police of a sit-in held by supporters of the late Mohamed Morsi, where hundreds of protesters were killed. According to HRW and Amnesty, as of January 2020, there are some 60,000 political prisoners in Egypt. Egyptian authorities harass and detain "relatives of dissidents abroad" and use of "vague 'morality' charges to prosecute LGBT people, female social media influencers, and survivors of sexual violence." The Egyptian government has frequently rejected such criticism, denying that any of the prisoners it holds are political prisoners.

Formally, human rights in Egypt are guaranteed by the Constitution of the Arab Republic of Egypt under the various articles of Chapter 3. The country is party to numerous international human rights treaties, including the International Covenant on Civil and Political Rights and the International Covenant on Economic, Social and Cultural Rights.

== Rights and liberties ratings and summaries ==
In 2021, Freedom House ranked Egypt as "Not Free" in its annual Freedom in the World report. It gave Egypt a "Political Rights" score of 6/40 and a "Civil Liberties" score of 12/60, with a total score of 18/100. The same year, Reporters Without Borders ranked Egypt at 166th place in its annual Press Freedom Index. As of 2020, the Committee to Protect Journalists regards Egypt as "the world's third-worst jailer of journalists", behind Turkey and China.

See the List of freedom indices for more information on these ratings and how they are determined.

The U.S. Department of State's "2019 Country Reports on Human Rights Practices" listed the following perceived human rights issues in Egypt:

Significant human rights issues included: unlawful or arbitrary killings, including extrajudicial killings by the government or its agents and terrorist groups; forced disappearance; torture; arbitrary detention; harsh and life-threatening prison conditions; political prisoners; arbitrary or unlawful interference with privacy; the worst forms of restrictions on free expression, the press, and the internet, including arrests or prosecutions against journalists, censorship, site blocking, and the existence of unenforced criminal libel; substantial interference with the rights of peaceful assembly and freedom of association, such as overly restrictive laws governing civil society organizations; restrictions on political participation; violence involving religious minorities; violence targeting lesbian, gay, bisexual, transgender, and intersex (LGBTI) persons; use of the law to arbitrarily arrest and prosecute LGBTI persons; and forced or compulsory child labor.

Human Rights Watch complained that an "unfair referendum" by authorities in 2019 added amendments to the constitution consolidating "authoritarian rule, undermin[ing] the judiciary's dwindling independence, and expand[ing] the military's power to intervene in political life." Using the excuse of fighting the terrorist ISIS insurgency, "Egyptian authorities showed utter disregard for the rule of law. Since April 2017, President Abdel Fattah al-Sisi ha[d] maintained a nation-wide state of emergency that [gave] security forces unchecked powers." Since then, the state of emergency has been officially lifted, as of October 2021.

The government-appointed organization for human rights in Egypt is called the National Council for Human Rights.

On 21 September 2022, the Amnesty International released a report titled "Disconnected from Reality: Egypt's National Human Rights Strategy covers up human rights crisis". The report presents a detailed analysis of Egypt's National Human Rights Strategy (NHRS) in light of the human rights situation on the ground, revealing how authorities have used it as a propaganda tool to cover up unrelenting repression of any form of dissent. The five-year strategy was drafted by the government without any consultation with independent human rights organizations or public engagement.

In March 2023, Human Rights Watch released a report stating that the Egyptian authorities refused to provide identity documents, such as passports, national IDs and birth certificates, to critics living abroad. The organization claimed that Egypt probably attempted to disrupt the lives of the dissidents by forcing them to choose between effectively falling in the undocumented category or returning to Egypt, where they could possibly be detained and tortured.

== Freedom of speech ==
The Press Law, Publications Law, and the penal code of Egypt regulate and govern the press. According to these, criticism of the president can be punished by fines or imprisonment. Freedom House deems Egypt to have an unfree press, although it mentions that the country does have a wide range of sources. As of 2020, Reporters Without Borders (RsF) ranked Egypt 166 out of 180 countries in press freedom. Press freedom has gone from 143rd out of 167 nations in 2008, to 158th in the world in 2013. The RsF group laments that the Sisi government has "bought up the biggest media groups to the point that it now controls the entire media landscape and has imposed a complete clampdown on free speech." The two sources agree that promised reforms on the subject have been disappointingly slow or uneven in implementation. Freedom House had a slightly more positive assessment indicating that increased freedom to discuss controversial issues has occurred.

Following the Arab Spring there was hope for greater freedom of speech in Egypt. However, as of February 2012, television journalist Tim Sebastian reported a "re-emergence of fear" in Egypt.

"Once again, I was told, Egyptians are starting to look over their shoulder to see who might be listening, to be careful what they say on the phone, to begin considering all over again who they can and cannot trust."

"The intelligence services are extremely active," says a well-known commentator.

The United States State Department voiced concern in August 2012 about freedom of the press in Egypt, following a move by the authorities to put two critics of Egyptian President Mohamed Morsi on trial. The State Department also criticized Egypt for actions against Al-Dustour, a small independent newspaper, and the Al-Faraeen channel, both of which have criticized Morsi and the Muslim Brotherhood.

In July 2016, Egyptian security forces stormed the home of Liliane Daoud, a Lebanese-British journalist, and whisked her to the airport. Without advance warning, Ms. Daoud found herself on a plane to Lebanon. Before her deportation, Ms. Daoud was fired from her job at the local private channel just a few weeks after a pro-Sisi businessman bought it. In August 2018, the Egyptian government put television host Mohamed al-Ghiety on trial for interviewing an anonymous gay man. He was later jailed, fined and sentenced to a year of hard labor.

According to human rights organizations, Egyptian authorities have banned over 500 people, most of which are activists, from travel at Egyptian airports since July 2013.

Amnesty International said Egyptian authorities are increasingly using arbitrary and excessive probation measures as a way to harass activists. They have been imposed extreme conditions in some cases, where activists released from prison forced to spend up to 12 hours a day in a police station. Police probation in Egypt requires released prisoners and detainees to spend a certain number of hours at a police station daily or weekly. Amnesty International has documented at least 13 cases in which probation measures were excessive or were arbitrarily imposed against activists. In some cases, activists are detained for a second time as a probation ways. Amnesty International called on the Egyptian authorities to lift all arbitrary probation measures and order the immediate and unconditional release of activists who have been detained.

In late 2017, the Egyptian police cracked down on the selling of a toy dubbed 'Sisi's testicles' or 'Sisi's pendulum', used by children to mock the president. The police "arrested 41 clacker sellers and seized 1,403 pairs of the 'offensive' toy," according to local daily al-Masry al-Youm.

In 2018, Egyptian dissident Mohamed Ali (currently living in Spain) posted videos of corruption within the Egyptian President Abdel Fattah el-Sisi's government. The videos sparked anti-government protests in Egypt. Egyptian authorities requested the Spanish government of extraditing Mohamed Ali on charges of tax evasion and money laundering committed back in his home country. On 9 July 2020, Mohamed Ali appeared in a preliminary hearing in front of the Spanish judge where he was given 45 days' notice to bring up a case on why he should not be sent back to Egypt.

On 31 October 2021, Amnesty International denounced the lifting of the state of emergency in Egypt, saying it does not consider it to be a meaningful step. The rights organization highlighted the ongoing trials of a number of arbitrarily detained activists, human rights defenders, journalists, opposition politicians and peaceful protesters, where the proceedings are majorly fundamentally unfair. Amnesty said that Egypt must immediately and unconditionally release all those facing trials for peacefully exercising their rights, in order to make their decision meaningful.

Events of 2020–2021

On 10 March 2020, a human rights lawyer Zyad el-Elaimy, was imprisoned for a year and fined E£20,000. He was charged for "spreading false news with an intent to spread panic among the people and for disturbing public peace", during an interview with BBC in 2017. However, the Amnesty International rights group said that el-Elaimy was unlawfully charged for speaking publicly about politically motivated imprisonment, enforced disappearance and torture in Egypt.

On 18 March 2020, four human rights activists, concerning grave conditions of prisons amidst the coronavirus outbreak, called for the release of patrons imprisoned for their political views. However, the Egyptian authorities instead held captive the demonstrators and charged them of spreading the hoax narrative, whilst violating the country's protest ban.

On 23 June 2020, Amnesty International reported that Egyptian security forces had abducted human rights defender Sanaa Seif from outside the Public Prosecutor's office in New Cairo. She reportedly visited the office to file a complaint against a violent assault, which she and her family suffered outside the Tora Prison Complex the previous day. Sanaa Seif's brother and a famous human rights activist, Alaa Abd El-Fattah remains in arbitrary detention at the Tora prison, since September 2019. The report revealed that Sanaa was taken to the office of the Supreme State Security Prosecution in Cairo, where the prosecutors questioned her over the charges of "disseminating false news", "inciting terrorist crimes" and "misuse of social media". On 7 September 2020, Amnesty International reported that she was arrested for the third time.

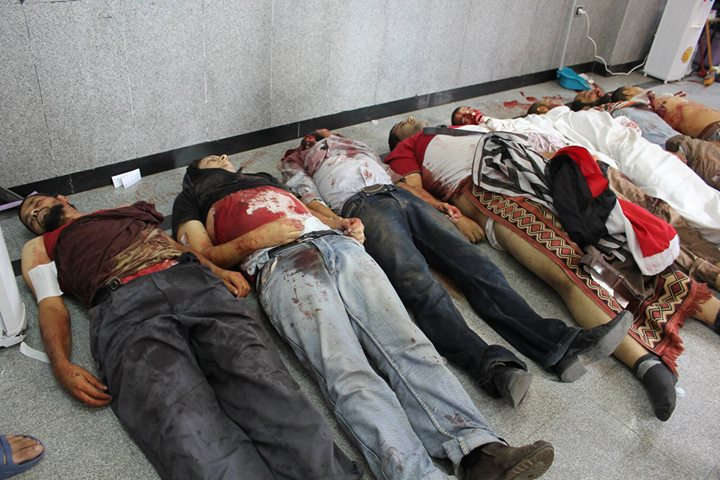
The bodies of protesters who died during the August 2013 Rabaa massacre

On 15 June 2020, Egyptian security forces arrested five relatives of US-based dissident Mohamed Soltan in an attempt to pressure him into dropping the lawsuit against the former Prime Minister of Egypt. In early June 2020, Soltan filed a lawsuit under the US' Torture Victim Protection Act against Former Prime Minister Hazem El Beblawi, on overseeing 21 months of torture and ill-treatment. In 2013 he was arrested for documenting the Rabaa massacre.

In July 2020, the government of Egypt was accused of unfairly arresting United States citizens and human rights activists who criticized or spoke against the Egyptian government. The victims stated that the country has been silencing them by harassing and threatening their relatives living in Egypt.

According to ABC News, in July 2020 Egyptian authorities arrested 10 doctors and six journalists to stifle criticism about the handling of the COVID-19 pandemic in Egypt by the government led by President Abdel Fattah el-Sisi.

On 30 June 2020, Egyptian authorities reportedly arrested healthcare workers and journalists, who complained about lack of hospital protective gears and criticized the state's response to the COVID-19 pandemic. Egyptian authorities also arrested doctors who reported COVID-19 cases without authorization. Doctors recounted threats delivered via WhatsApp, official letters or in person. As of 15 July 2020, a human rights group documented the arrest of at least six doctors and two pharmacists. Seven members of the Egyptian Medical Syndicate, a quasi-government body that represents healthcare workers, have also been detained for discussing COVID-19 on social media.

On 27 July 2020, an Egyptian court sentenced five female social media influencers to two years in jail, including a fine of E£300,000 (approximately £14,600 stg), for posting videos on TikTok. The ruling accused the defendants of posting indecent videos and violating public morals. The arrests highlighted a social divide in a deeply conservative country over what constitutes individual freedoms and social norms. It was the first sentence issued by a court against female social media influencers in Egypt, after a series of arrests that mostly targeted women who were popular on TikTok.

On 4 August 2020, several celebrities wrote a letter to the Egyptian authorities to free prominent activist Sanaa Seif and other political prisoners. She has been held in pre-trial detention in Cairo since June. Seif is a film editor, who worked on the highly acclaimed documentary The Square. She is the sister of jailed activist Alaa Abd El-Fattah, who was one of the leading voices during the 2011 uprising that led to the ousting of then-president Hosni Mubarak in 2011.

On 25 August 2020, Egypt sentenced Bahey el-Din Hassan to 15 years in jail over anti-government advocacy. Human rights organizations, including the Amnesty International and FIDH, condemned the charges filed against Hassan as 'bogus' and 'extremely outrageous'. The UN High Commissioner for Human Rights and the European Parliament, in addition to hundreds of public figures, journalists, academics, artists and intellectuals from across the world, also condemned the sentence. The ruling was part of the reprisal against Hassan for promoting human rights in Egypt.

Egyptian security forces arrested two journalists from Al Youm Al Sabea newspaper namely, Hany Greisha and El-Sayed Shehta, for allegedly spreading false news. Greisha was arrested on 26 August 2020 and charged with the misuse of social media, spreading false news, and maintaining connections with The Muslim Brotherhood, an alleged terrorist organization. He was detained for 15 days, according to reports. The second detainee, El-Sayed Shehta, who was arrested on 30 August 2020 from his hometown, was tested COVID-19 positive and quarantining at his home at the time. Committee to Protect Journalists (CPJ) demanded the immediate release of the journalists due to coronavirus pandemic. Authorities in charge of the police and prison system did not respond to CPJ's email asking for comment and the reason for arresting the journalists.

On 22 September 2020, Amnesty International raised concerns regarding the ongoing arbitrary detention of journalist and human rights defender, Esraa Abdelfattah. Esraa was arrested by security forces on 12 October 2019 and accused of "joining a terrorist organization" and "participating in a criminal agreement intended to commit a terrorist crime from inside prison". On 30 August 2020, Esraa Abdelfattah was brought in front of the Supreme State Security Prosecution (SSSP) to face questioning over the investigations.

On 3 November 2020, Amnesty International raised voice against the ongoing arbitrary detention of journalist Solafa Magdy concerning her deteriorating health. Solafa Magdy was detained since 26 November 2019 as part of her participation in the March 2019 anti-government protests with her husband and 2 other journalists. On 30 August 2020, the Supreme State Security Prosecution (SSSP) interrogated Solafa Magdy, on new unfounded charges including joining a terrorist group.

On 19 November 2020, Egypt security forces detained three members of the independent human rights organization, Egyptian Initiative for Personal Rights (EIPR). The Amnesty International described the arrests as a "chilling escalation" of the government's crackdown. Other human rights groups said that dozens of activists have been targeted with arrests, travel bans, and asset freezes, under President Abdul Fattah al-Sisi. On 27 November 2020, the United Nations Human Rights experts called the Egyptian authority to drop the charges and release all four human rights activists working with EIPR. Three were arrested few days after the meeting with 13 foreign ambassadors and diplomats on 3 November 2020, over the charges of terrorism and public security, while EIPR's gender rights researcher, Patrick Zaki was arrested in February 2020.

The European Parliament urged the member states in a resolution issued in December 2020, to impose sanctions on Egypt for its actions against the human rights defenders, particularly of the EIPR. The international backlash against Egypt mounted after three activists from the EIPR were arrested. They were later released, but the assets were kept frozen.

In March 2021, 31 countries including the US, the United Kingdom, Canada, Australia and Germany, issued a joint declaration to the United Nations Human Rights Council expressing deep concern about the trajectory of human rights in Egypt. The statement highlighted "restrictions on freedom of expression and the right to peaceful assembly, the constrained space for civil society and political opposition, and the application of terrorism legislation against peaceful critics."

In March, Sanaa Seif was sentenced to 18 months in prison for "spreading false news". Instead of getting justice for an assault she faced along with her mother and sister outside the Tora prison, Seif has been accused of making unfounded claims about the handling of COVID-19 outbreaks in Egyptian prisons. Amnesty International called her conviction charged on bogus claims "stemming purely from her peaceful criticism".

US President Joe Biden's administration affirmed in early April 2021 that the former Egyptian PM and IMF representative Hazem el-Beblawi benefited diplomatic immunity from the federal lawsuit filed against him by Mohamed Soltan in 2020 holding Hazem accountable for torturing him in prison. Soltan, a Washington, D.C.–based human rights advocate claimed in his lawsuit that during his imprisonment of 21 months between 2013 and 2015, he was subjected to beating and torture and was shot at by authorization by Beblawi. As per human rights organizations, the Abdel Fateh Al Sisi government, under a law sanctioned by Beblawi, arrested thousands of civilians on political grounds, including US citizens like Mustafa Kassem, who succumbed during his imprisonment in January 2020.

The Egyptian student, Patrick Zaki, who was arrested at the Cairo airport for allegedly spreading fake news on social media platforms that caused unauthorized protests, was offered Italian citizenship by their government via a senate voting. The decision was largely supported by a senate majority of 208 to 0 to get the 27-year-old researcher released sooner. Reportedly, Zaki has been detained for more than 2 years and hasn't been offered a trial, which counts as a violation of human rights. Rome has demanded the release of Zaki in the past, but the request was rebuffed.

In May 2021, Amnesty International shunned Egyptian authorities over its crackdown on freedom of expression. The rights group said that the nation on one hand supports Gaza, while on the other has held hostage a man for raising the Palestinian flag in solidarity with them.

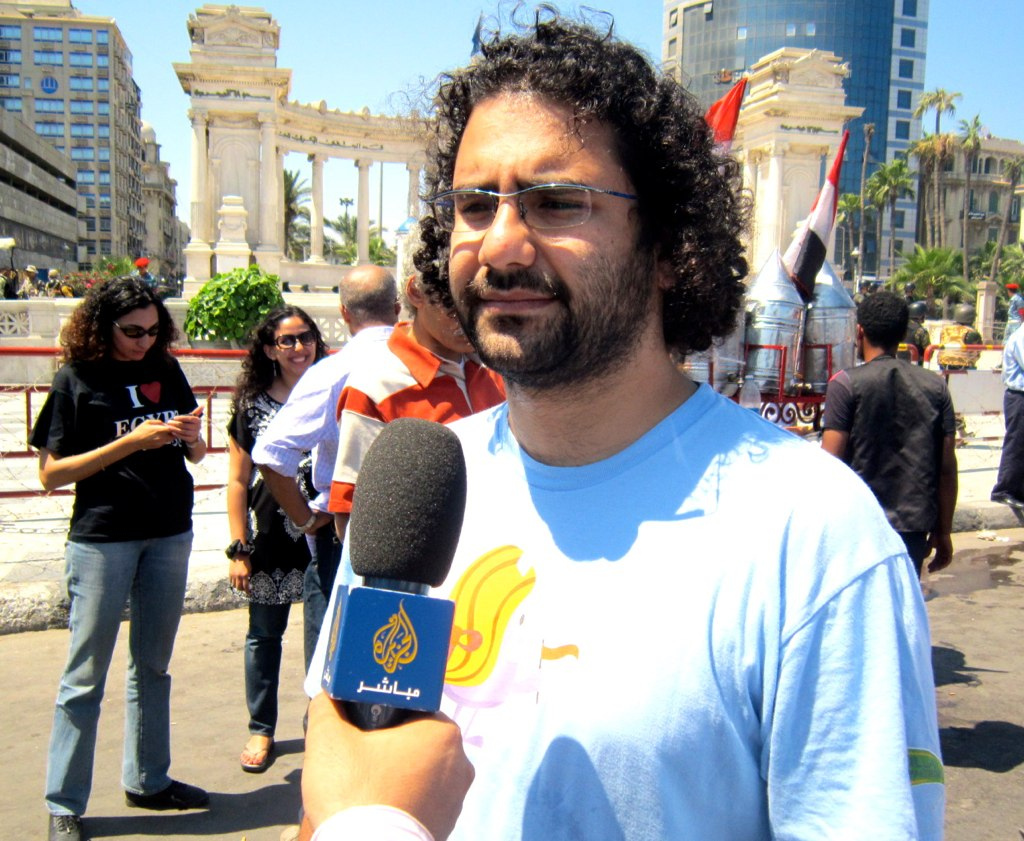
Prominent Egyptian activist Alaa Abd El-Fattah was sentenced to five years of imprisonment for "spreading fake news" in December 2021

On 1 June 2021, HRW alongside 62 other organizations called on President Abdel Fattah al-Sisi to immediately end the crackdown on peaceful dissent, freedom of association, and independent groups. The signatories said that they are worried about the con-current situation in Egypt including arbitrary arrest, detention, and other judicial harassment of human rights defenders. In their statement, they also showed solidarity with the findings of the UN, stating the concerns over cruel and inhuman prison conditions, and the deliberate denial of adequate medical care that has led or contributed to preventable deaths in custody and serious damage to prisoners’ health. In 2020 alone, at least 35 people died in custody or shortly after following medical complications. The health and human rights crisis in prisons was further exacerbated by the authorities' failure to adequately address COVID-19 outbreaks.

On 15 November 2021, 14 human rights groups reported that the Egyptian authorities forcibly disappeared Salah Soltan in June 2020, as a result of his son's human rights activism. Soltan is the father of a prominent US-based human rights activist, Mohamed Soltan. He was held in conditions that may amount to torture or other ill-treatment, including prolonged solitary confinement. The prison authorities deprived him of access to proper medical care and basic hygiene necessities. Egyptian authorities also carried out reprisals against other members of the Soltan family.

In November 2021, an investigation by Amnesty International concluded that Egyptian authorities were complicit in the crackdown on the factory workers who were demanding job security and higher pay through a peaceful strike. Nearly 2,000 employees of an Egyptian manufacturer, LORD International, went on a strike between July 26 and August 1. Amnesty revealed that the Egyptian Ministry of Manpower failed to provide any solution to workers who faced reprisals for taking part in the strike. Moreover, the official complaints of the workers were dismissed and pressure was put on them to end their “illegal strike”.

2022

In March 2022, two Egyptian singers, Hamo Beeka and Omar Kamal, were sentenced to two years in prison and fines by the Alexandria Economic Court. They were convicted on vague charges of "violating family values in Egyptian society and profiting from a video including dancing and singing". The fine imposed was of E£10,000 (US$538), along with an additional E£10,000 fee to suspend the prison sentences. They were reportedly charged because of a music video, in which the two men sang and danced along with a Brazilian belly dancer. Rights organizations condemned that the charges violated the right to free speech of the two singers.

2023

The repercussions of anti-government protests held in 2019 haven't settled in Egypt yet, therefore, the government announced the sentencing of 82 people in January 2023. There were 38 people sentenced for life, which included Mohammad Ali. Meanwhile, 44 others were given prison term for 5 to 15 years. The sentencing included 22 children for participating in the 2019 anti-government protests.

In January 2023, Egypt arrested five social media content creators for publishing a comic sketch about a visit to an Egyptian jail. The video clip titled "The Visit" was published on 13 January 2023, and was widely viewed on social media. Mokhtar Mounir, a lawyer for two of those arrested, said they face charges such as "joining a terrorist group, funding terrorism, publishing false news and utilizing social media accounts to commit acts of terrorism".

Human Rights Watch published a report in March 2023 revealing that the Egyptian authorities were refusing to provide critics living abroad with their identity documents, including passports, birth certificates, and ID cards. The report said that the authorities' goal appeared to disrupt the lives of dissidents, who would be forced to choose between remaining undocumented or coming back to Egypt, where they might face imprisonment or torture.

=== Political prisoners ===
According to Salah Sallam, ("a former member of Egypt’s government-appointed" Human Rights association), it is against the law to call "someone who’s conspired against the state a political prisoner,” making it effectively against the law to protest the arrest of such a person by calling them a political prisoner. Nonetheless, it was common in "prison and court", for "guards and judges openly refer to detainees not linked to violence as 'political', according to "former detainees and lawyers".

According to The New York Times, the Egyptian government "has long denied holding any political detainees", but in the last few weeks as of late June 2022, "some officials have begun to acknowledge the practice of imprisoning people for their political views", saying it was "necessary to restore stability" after the 2011 Arab Spring revolution in Egypt. International human rights organizations reported that there are some 60,000 political prisoners in Egypt. The Egyptian government was thought to be under pressure to improve its human rights record after the death of prominent economist Ayman Hadhoud in custody "hit international headlines", Hadhoud presumed to "have been tortured to death by state security", who did not bother notifying his family until over a month after his death.

On 19 July 2022, a political prisoner, Mahmoud Othman, died inside the Borg El Arab prison, west of Alexandria, Egypt, as a result of inhumane conditions of detention. As of 25 July 2022, almost 1,163 deaths have been documented inside detention centers and prisons in Egypt since 2013. In its report titled "Egyptian prisons: rehabilitation centres or graves for human rights", the Committee For Justice organization have outlined the verdicts issued against many human rights and political figures in Egypt. The report also outlined the findings of documented violations, including 7,369 violations in 66 official and unofficial places of detention. The documented violations were topped by arbitrary deprivation of liberty, followed by enforced disappearance, poor conditions of detention, torture, and deaths in detention facilities.

== Freedom of religion ==
=== Legal challenges ===
The 2014 Constitution of Egypt declares Islam as the state religion and states that "the principles of Islamic sharia are the main sources of legislation." The government officially recognizes only Islam, Christianity, and Judaism, which results in members of unrecognized religious groups, such as Baháʼís and nonreligious individuals, facing difficulties in obtaining official identification and vital documents, including marriage and death certificates.

The Egyptian legal system does not formally recognize conversion from Islam to other religions, which has led to significant administrative and legal obstacles for converts. In contrast, conversion to Islam is generally accepted without difficulty. According to a 2010 Pew Research Center poll, 84 percent of Egyptian Muslims surveyed supported the death penalty for apostasy from Islam.

Egypt also maintains laws against “insulting” Islam, Christianity, or Judaism, which have been used to prosecute individuals for blasphemy or unorthodox religious expression. Members of minority Muslim sects, such as the Ahmadiyya, have faced arrest and detention.

The Baháʼí community in Egypt has also faced longstanding legal and administrative discrimination. Although the Baháʼí Faith was recognized in 1925, this recognition was revoked following the dissolution of the monarchy in 1953. Law 263 of 1960, issued by presidential decree under Gamal Abdel Nasser, banned all Baháʼí institutions and activities, and led to the confiscation of Baháʼí properties.

Because national ID cards only allowed Islam, Christianity, or Judaism to be listed under religion, Baháʼís were effectively denied identification documents, which restricted access to education, employment, health care, and other civil rights. Legal challenges in the 2000s led to conflicting rulings. A 2006 court decision recognized Baháʼís’ right to identify their faith on documents, but this was overturned later that year by the Supreme Administrative Court, reaffirming that the state could not recognize the Baháʼí Faith. In 2008, a court allowed Baháʼís to obtain ID cards by leaving the religion field blank, providing limited relief.

Christian converts from Islam have also faced legal challenges. In one notable case, convert Mohamed Hegazy sued to have his religious status changed on official documents. His case, along with others involving reversion to Christianity after previously converting to Islam, was rejected by the courts.

=== Church construction ===
Christians, who comprise an estimated 10 percent of Egypt’s population, have long faced difficulties related to the construction and repair of churches. Regulations dating back to the Ottoman era required presidential approval for any church building or renovation. Although a 1999 presidential decree aligned these processes with the 1976 civil construction code, in practice, Christians continued to report bureaucratic delays and obstruction by local authorities.

In September 2016, the Egyptian parliament passed a new law aimed at streamlining the process for church construction and legalizing unlicensed churches. The legislation was welcomed by some Christian Members of Parliament and clergy for removing previous restrictions such as requiring permits based on local Christian population size. Despite early criticism, the law has resulted in the legalization of thousands of churches. Increased cooperation from government authorities has been reported, and in some areas, communities have built new places of worship without obstruction.

=== Violence ===
Coptic Christians in Egypt have been the target of repeated acts of violence. In January 2010, a drive-by shooting in Nag Hammadi killed six Christians and a Muslim security guard. A year later, on 1 January 2011, a bombing at a Coptic church in Alexandria resulted in the deaths of 21 people.

Following the Egyptian Revolution of 2011, concerns mounted over the growing influence of Islamist political movements on religious freedoms. In 2012, several legal cases were brought against individuals, particularly Christians, on charges of contempt for Islam. Reports also emerged of coercive behavior by religious conservatives, including a widely reported incident in which a schoolteacher cut the hair of two girls for not wearing the hijab.

In early 2017, Amnesty International documented a series of attacks by the Islamic State in Egypt’s North Sinai region, which specifically targeted Coptic Christians. Between January and February, at least seven people were killed, leading more than 150 Coptic families to flee the town of al-Arish.

During this period, Egypt was also ranked 25th out of 50 countries on the Open Doors World Watch List, which assesses the severity of persecution and danger faced by Christians worldwide. By 2025, Egypt had dropped to 40th out of 50, suggesting a relative decline in the frequency or intensity of reported persecution. Despite persistent challenges, Egypt ranked among the least dangerous countries in the region for Christians, following Jordan, Turkey, and Qatar.

== Status of minorities ==
=== Religious discrimination ===
Between December 31, 1999, and January 2, 2000, 21 Coptic Christians were killed in the town of Al-Kosheh during sectarian clashes. Some Egyptian media sources attributed the violence in part to economic tensions, while others cited long-standing religious discrimination. Additional sectarian unrest occurred in 2005 during riots in Alexandria.

Multiple reports have alleged the abduction of Coptic Christian women and girls, forced conversion to Islam, and coerced marriages to Muslim men. In 2010, a bipartisan group of U.S. Congress members raised concerns about instances involving captivity, violence, and exploitation. A study by Christian Solidarity International documented similar concerns, and in 2017, additional claims of organized abduction and trafficking were reported.

According to the Association of Victims of Abduction and Forced Disappearance, an estimated 550 Coptic girls were abducted between 2011 and 2014, with some reportedly subjected to sexual violence prior to conversion and marriage.

Legal advocacy organizations have raised concerns about state treatment of minority rights defenders. In May 2016, Amnesty International reported the arrest of Mina Thabet, a Coptic activist and minority rights advocate, on charges related to incitement, despite limited evidence.

=== Racism ===
Racism has been documented in Egyptian society and media. Black refugees and migrants, including South Sudanese and other sub-Saharan Africans, have reported frequent harassment and violence.

In October 2005, Egyptian security forces violently dispersed a sit-in by Sudanese refugees near the UNHCR office in Cairo, killing 134 and injuring hundreds. The incident is commonly referred to as the Mustapha Mahmoud Park Massacre.

In 2021, a Sudanese refugee and her unborn child died after collapsing outside the UNHCR office in 6 October City, reportedly due to delayed medical attention.

In another case from May 2021, three South Sudanese minors were abducted and assaulted, including incidents of sexual violence and forced head-shaving, prompting condemnation from rights organizations.

In late 2021 and early 2022, Egyptian authorities reportedly detained at least 30 Sudanese refugees who had participated in protests against racial discrimination and conditions affecting the refugee community.

Criticism has been directed at Egyptian media for perpetuating racial stereotypes. Depictions of blackface, cultural appropriation, and racist tropes remain present in entertainment media and advertising.

In 2016, public figures including Mortada Mansour were criticized for making racist remarks about Nubians on national television.

== Status of women ==
The Ministry of Health issued a decree in 1996 declaring female circumcision unlawful and punishable under the Penal Code, and according to UNICEF the prevalence of women who have had this procedure has slowly declined from a baseline of 97% of women aged 15–49 since 1995. According to a report in the British Medical Journal BMJ, "[t]he issue came to prominence...when the CNN television news channel broadcast a programme featuring a young girl being circumcised by a barber in Cairo. ...Shocked at the images shown worldwide, the Egyptian president was forced to agree to push legislation through the People's Assembly to ban the operation". Despite the ban, the procedure continues to be practiced in Egypt and remains controversial. In 2006, Al-Azhar University lecturers Dr. Muhammad Wahdan and Dr. Malika Zarrar debated the topic in a televised debate. Dr. Zarrar, who objected to the procedure, said..."Circumcision is always brutal...I consider this to be a crime, in terms of both religious and civil law". Dr. Wahdan defended the partial removal of the clitoris for girls who Muslim doctors determine require it, saying it prevents sexual arousal in women in whom it would be inappropriate such as unmarried girls and spinsters. He cited Muslim custom, Islamic law, and a study reporting that the procedure is a determinant of chastity in Egyptian girls. He also blamed the controversy about the procedure on the fact that the "West wants to impose its culture and philosophy on us". The ban was controversial in the medical community as well. In the debates leading up to the ban, a gynecologist at Cairo University, said that "Female circumcision is entrenched in Islamic life and teaching," and, "called on the government to implement training programmes for doctors to carry out the operation under anesthesia. Another doctor reportedly said, "If my daughter is not circumcised no man is going to marry her." Other MDs stated that the, "trauma of the operation remains with the girl for the rest of her life,..."[disputing] the argument that the procedure prevents women from "moral deviation," and argued that it is not, "a legitimate medical practice, and when it is conducted by untrained people it frequently results in infection and other medical problems..."

In 2017, Cairo was voted the most dangerous megacity for women with more than 10 million inhabitants in a poll by Thomson Reuters Foundation. Sexual harassment was described as occurring on a daily basis.

According to the Human Rights Watch 2019 report, 69 Egyptian women were imprisoned because of peaceful demonstrations in 2018. The detainees were subjected to enforced disappearance, imprisonment, humiliation, and harassment inside the detention centres. They were not provided with food and medicine in a proper way and were not allowed to meet their families. Since 2013, more than 2,500 women have been arrested arbitrarily.

In 2021, The New York Times interviewed several Egyptian women who revealed to have been sexually abused by government officials when they were either arrested for speaking out or had gone to the authorities to report a crime. The women claimed that they were sexually abused during routine searches by the police or prison guards and/or by state-employed doctors ordered to conduct invasive physical exams and virginity tests.

In June 2021, Egypt ordered a 10-year sentence to Haneen Hossam and Mawada al-Adham, social media celebrities, for "undermining family values and principles" by publishing "indecent" videos. Since 2020, at least 10 other female social media influencers have been arrested and sentenced to hefty fines and prison sentences of up to five years.

In acknowledgment of the efforts of Egyptian feminist activists, the BBC 100 Women list has twice included Egyptian women rights defenders for their work combating sexual harassment and gender-based violence in its 2020 and 2022 versions: Nadeen Ashraf in the first, and Gehad Hamdy in the second.

== Child labor ==
In 2013, the U.S. Department of Labor's report Findings on the Worst Forms of Child Labor in Egypt stated that "children in Egypt are engaged in child labor, including in agriculture and domestic service" and that "the Government has not addressed gaps in its legal and enforcement framework to protect children". Statistics in the report show that 6.7% of Egyptian children aged 5 to 14 are working children and that 55% of them work in agriculture. In December 2014, the department's List of Goods Produced by Child Labor or Forced Labor mentioned 2 goods produced under such working conditions: cotton and limestone. Quarrying limestone has been determined by national law as a hazardous activity. Efforts to reduce child labor have increased. For example, from April 1, 2016, to April 30, 2018, the International Labor Organization embarked on a project combating child labor in Egypt. In 2018, the Ministry of Social Solidarity provided financial aid to over 1.6 million people to help fund childhood education in order to decrease the amount of child labor.

== LGBTQ rights ==
Homosexuality is considered taboo. Until recently, the government denied that homosexuality existed in Egypt, but recently official crackdowns have occurred for reasons felt to include the desire to appease Islamic clerics, to distract from economic issues, or as a cover-up for closet homosexuals in high places. In 2002, 52 men were rounded up on the Queen Boat, a floating nightclub, by police, where they were beaten and tortured. Eventually, 29 were acquitted and 23 were convicted for "debauchery and defaming Islam" and sentenced for up to five years in prison with hard labor. Since the trial was held in a state security court, no appeal was allowed. A spokesman for the Muslim Brotherhood, a political party rising in popularity in Egypt, condemns homosexuality, saying, "From my religious view, all the religious people, in Christianity, in Judaism, condemn homosexuality," he says. "It is against the whole sense in Egypt. The temper in Egypt is against homosexuality." A government spokesman said the Queen Boat incident was not a violation of human rights but, "actually an interpretation of the norms of our society, the family values of our society. And no one should judge us by their own values. And some of these values in the West are actually in decay."

In 2006, Human Rights Watch released a 144-page report called In a Time of Torture: The Assault on Justice in Egypt's Crackdown on Homosexual Conduct. The report stated that "The detention and torture of hundreds of men reveals the fragility of legal protections for individual privacy and due process for all Egyptians." Egyptian human rights organizations including the Hisham Mubarak Law Centre, the Egyptian Association Against Torture, the Egyptian Initiative for Personal Rights, the Nadim Centre for the Psychological Management and Rehabilitation of Victims of Violence, and the Arabic Network for Human Rights Information also helped HRW to launch the report. A spokesman for Human Rights Watch stated, "when we talk about the situation of homosexuals in Egypt, we don't describe the Queen Boat Case, but we describe a continuing practice of arresting and torturing gay men." A Cairo court sentenced 21 men to prison in 2003 after it found them guilty of "habitual debauchery", in a case named after the nightclub they were arrested in, the Queen Boat. He also pointed out that, under the pretext of medical exams, the Forensic Medical Authority contributed to the torture of the defendants."

According to a report in the Egyptian press, "the government accuses human rights groups of importing a Western agenda that offends local religious and cultural values. Rights groups deny this claim, but independent critics argue that it's not void of some truth. Citing the failure of these groups to create a grass-roots movement, critics point to "imported" issues such as female genital mutilation and gay rights as proof that many human rights groups have a Western agenda that seems more important than pressing issues that matter to ordinary Egyptians—such as environmental, labour, housing and educational rights," and says that the issues brought up at the press conference to launch the above report, "reminded some in the audience of US efforts to impose its own vision of democracy in Egypt as part of the US administration's plan for a Greater Middle East."

== Status of Palestinians ==
Palestinians who lived in the Gaza Strip when Israel came into being were issued with Egyptian travel documents which allowed them to move outside of the Gaza Strip, and Egypt. Their status as refugees has been deteriorating rapidly since the 1970s. After 1948 they were allowed rights similar to Egyptian nationals, and in 1963 they were allowed to own agricultural land, nor did they have to acquire work visas. In 1964 the government decreed that Palestinian refugees had to obtain an exit visa, an entry visa or a transit visa. In 1976 a law was passed stating that no foreigners could own real property, although Palestinians were later granted the right to own agricultural land. In 1978 the ability of Palestinians to work in the civil service was revoked. Gradually the process of attaining travel documents for Palestinians has become more difficult. Jordanian Palestinians who hold two-year passports are now required to obtain entry and exit visas to travel to Egypt.

President Anwar Sadat enacted a law banning Palestinian children from attending public schools. He enacted Law 48, banning Palestinian workers from employment in the public sector. Palestinians came under surveillance by Egyptian security services after the 1978 assassination Egyptian Minister of Culture Yusuf Sibai by the Palestinian terrorist group Abu Nidal.

Egypt has been accused of practicing apartheid against Palestinian residents by refusing to grant them the opportunity to become citizens.

== Conditions for detainees and torture ==
According to the Egyptian Organization for Human Rights in 2011, 701 cases of torture at Egyptian police stations have been documented since 1985, with 204 victims dying of torture and mistreatment. The group contends that crimes of torture occur in Egyptian streets in broad daylight, at police checkpoints, and in people's homes in flagrant violation of the people's dignity and freedom.`

In 1993, the El Nadeem Centre for the Rehabilitation of Victims of Violence and Torture was founded by a group of doctors and activists, including Aida Seif el-Dawla, to provide practical and psychiatric support to former detainees who had been tortured in custody. It remains active as of 2026, though in 2017 the Egyptian government attempted to shut it down, before a court annulled the order in 2021.

A 2005 report of the National Council for Human Rights, chaired by former UN secretary-general and former Egyptian deputy prime minister Boutros Boutros-Ghali, cites instances of torture of detainees in Egyptian prisons and describes the deaths while in custody of 9 individuals as, "regrettable violations of the right to life." The report called for "an end to [a] state of emergency, which has been in force since 1981, saying it provided a loophole by which the authorities prevent some Egyptians enjoying their right to personal security."

According to an Al-Jazeera report, the Council asked government departments to respond to complaints, but "The Interior Ministry, which runs the police force and the prisons, ...answered [only] three out of 75 torture allegations." The council also recommended that President Hosni Mubarak, "issue a decree freeing detainees...in bad health."

In February 2017, Amnesty International's report accused the Egyptian authority of violating human rights. On February 9, 2017, El Nadeem Center for rehabilitation of victims of violence was shut down. The shutdown of the center was considered another shocking attack on civil society since it offers supporting victims of torture and other ill-treatment and families of people subjected to enforced disappearances in the country, which should have been given support not punishment over carrying out its values. As the report suggested, the shutdown of the center follows a year of harassment by the authorities on human rights activists; yet the center made a judicial appeal against the decision. The police carried out the latest raid without waiting for the outcome of this appeal, however. The Cairo Institute for Human Rights Studies documented 39 people who have been executed since December 2017. These individuals were mostly civilians who were convicted under military jurisdiction which is in violation of International human rights standards.

Welcome parades, in which new prisoners are physically and psychologically abused while crawling between two lines of policemen, is a torture technique used in Egyptian prisons. In September 2019 during the 2019 Egyptian protests, blogger Alaa Abd el-Fattah and his lawyer Mohamed el-Baqer of the Adalah Center for Rights and Freedoms were subjected to welcome parades in Tora Prison following their 29 September arrests.

According to a 43-page report "'No One Cared He Was A Child': Egyptian Security Forces’ Abuse of Children in Detention", by HRW and the rights group Belady, grave abuse against 20 children aged between 12 and 17 at the time of arrest have been committed. The report states that out of 20 children, 15 were tortured in pre-trial detention at the time of interrogation.

On 18 May 2020, HRW accused Egyptian authorities of holding thousands of people in pre-trial detention without a pretence of judicial review because of closure of courts amidst the COVID-19 pandemic.

An Egyptian-American citizen Moustafa Kassem was arrested in Egypt in 2013, during the military crackdown led by Abdel Fattah Al-Sisi. Kassem was arrested for having alleged links with the opposition party, but he insisted that he was wrongfully imprisoned. In September 2018, he was sentenced for 15 years in prison. He was kept in a high security prison where his medical conditions (diabetes & heart ailment) were left untreated. He was on hunger strike to protest against his unjust imprisonment and on 13 January 2020, he died in the prison while protesting.

On 20 July 2020, Human Rights Watch revealed a suspected COVID-19 outbreak in recent weeks in many Egyptian prisons. As a result, at least 14 prisoners and detainees died from the likely COVID-19 complications. On August 24, 2020, the United Nations rights experts also raised concern over severe risk faced by imprisoned Egyptian human rights defenders due to lengthy and unnecessary pre-trial detention, during COVID-19. The detained activists did not get chance to report their health conditions, or to individually contest the charges they faced under national security legislation.

On 6 September 2020, Egyptian Human Rights group accused the authorities in Egypt of "recycling" judicial cases against dissidents to extend their periods of detention. The "recycling" of cases is when a prosecutor accuses a person of a new case, who had already been released for a previous case.

On 4 November 2020, Amnesty International called on the Egyptian authorities to immediately release all Sudanese migrants and refugees detained for protesting against the killing of a Sudanese child in Cairo on 29 October. The rights group also called on Egypt to investigate the beating and other ill-treatment of protesters committed by the security forces.

A 28-year-old Italian student, Giulio Regeni was abducted by Egyptian security forces in February 2016, over the suspicion of being an Italian spy. His body was found after nine days, alongside the Cairo-Alexandria highway, which was disfigured and burnt. Many of the bones were broken and his initials were carved on the skin. During a period of over four years, the Egyptian authorities changed multiple statements in the case. In November 2020, the Italian prosecutors Sergio Colaiocco and Michele Prestipino placed five members of Egypt's security forces under official investigation for their alleged involvement in disappearance and torture of the Regeni. The prosecutors were scheduled to conclude their probe on 4 December 2020, following which they were to request the authority for a trial-in-absentia of the Egyptian security officials. On 2 December 2020, Egyptian authorities stated that they were temporarily closing the investigation into the 2016 murder of Italian student Giulio Regeni.

Amnesty International pressured the Egyptian authorities in early May 2021 to release the arbitrarily detained activist, Ahmed Douma, imprisoned for participation in anti-government demonstrations. Douma has been subjected to torture inside the prison, prolonged solitary confinement, enforced disappearance, and inadequate health care provision. The non-profit rights group has claimed that the activist is targeted due to political activism and the outspoken criticism of the Egyptian government.

In May 2021, the Egyptian border guards at Sinai coast detained 2 transgender Israelis because they appeared to be males while their passports defined them as females. The two tourists came for a holiday at Ras el-Satan, instead they became victims of Egypt's conservative mentality that does not accept LGBT community and denies them of basic human rights.

On 18 May 2021, the Human Rights Watch called on the Egyptian authorities to unconditionally release Hoda Abdel Hamid, who had been held captive for complaining about her son's treatment inside prison. The case dates back to April 26, when Police and National Security Agency officers arrested, mother of Abdelrahman Gamal Metwally al-Showeikh, as well as his father, Gamal, 65, and sister, Salsbeel, 18, in a raid on their home. However, the authorities later released father and sister. Earlier, on April 16, posted on her now-deleted Facebook post that her son, who had been involved in a quarrel on April 6 with a fellow prisoner inside prison, was with the assistance of guards and several other security men tied, beaten and sexually assaulted in several ways.

In August 2021, several human rights organisations in Egypt reported that the Gamasa Prison's security authorities forced the wives and children of detainees to walk without shoes over sand in the blazing heat in order to meet their families, leading to young girls witnessing heat strokes. The detainees in Egyptian prisons are not provided with basic hygiene items like soap and medicines, they have to rely on their families for these things. But there are several political prisoners who have been denied family visits by the Egyptian authorities. Over the years, detainees have also complained about poor or inadequate levels of food, as well as the absence of the prison doctor.

In 2021, between July and August, two political prisoners attempted suicide inside the Tora Prison. Abdulrahman Tariq was arrested in 2013 and was sentenced to three years in prison and three years of parole. He was rearrested in September 2019 on accusations of joining a terror group and financing terrorists. He tried to commit suicide in August because he had been granted parole twice but his release was delayed each time. He suffered from essential hypertension and was on a hunger strike to protest against the conditions of his detention and the fact that prison authorities added new cases to him every time he was about to be released. Earlier in July, blogger Mohamed Ibrahim attempted suicide after he was denied family visits for 15 months and was not allowed to use the money sent by his family to buy food.

On 8 January 2022, authorities in Egypt released Ramy Shaath after more than two years in pre-trial detention. The Egyptian-Palestinian activist was forced to renounce his Egyptian citizenship to gain his freedom. He described the network of overcrowded Egyptian prisons as "lacking respect for human dignity.” His detention, alongside other activists, came amid a crackdown on political dissent, which also targeted critics of President Abdel Fattah el-Sisi.

Salah Soltan, who has been subjected to enforced disappearance since June 2020, was held incommunicado and had experienced several medical emergencies. During his detention, he was frequently moved between cells, deliberately starved, and was subjected to torture. Salah's mistreatment was allegedly aimed at inflicting pain on Mohamed Soltan for his human rights work abroad. Egyptian prison authorities denied his multiple requests to see a doctor, as well as the medication and medical equipment he required for his multiple health conditions. Due to his deteriorating health, around 19 human rights organizations called on the US government to press Egypt to end the extrajudicial punishment of Salah Soltan, so that he could receive medical attention. They also called for the US to investigate the claims of torture.

In January 2022, The Guardian reported on the basis of leaked videos that Egyptian officers at al-Salam First police station in Cairo had been torturing and inflicting violence on the detainees with near total impunity. Revealing the extent of human rights abuse in the Egyptian prisons, one of the videos showed two detainees hung in stress positions. In another video, inmates lined up in an overcrowded cell to display injuries, which they say were inflicted by police officials and investigators. In February, the Egyptian authorities filmed confessions of the detainees in visibly coercive circumstances, where they admitted to staging the leaked videos. These videos were shared by pro-government media accounts. Amnesty International condemned the Egyptian authorities for opening investigations against nine detainees who appeared in the leaked videos and three others, including a 15-year-old child, instead of investigating the policemen responsible for the ill-treatment of detainees. The organization also documented that torture and other ill-treatment are routinely used in Egypt, which include electric shocks, suspension by the limbs, indefinite solitary confinement in inhumane conditions, sexual abuse and beatings.

A combined report by The Freedom Initiative and Egyptian Front for Human Rights – based on the interviews with former detainees, their family, lawyers and subject matter interest – documented 655 instances of sexual violence in Egyptian prisons against detainees and their loved ones, between 2015 and 2022. Egypt uses sexual violence as a method to intimidate, punish, and repress the people. In many cases, the detainees were exploited by the authorities for personal gratification and projecting power, while in other instances, it was used as a measure to punish. Children as young as 12 have been subjected to sexual violence in the Egyptian prisons.

Amnesty International updated on 21 November 2022 about the deteriorating condition of Alaa Abd El-Fattah, after his family raised concerns since their last visit. His family visited him on 17 November and claimed that his physical and mental state were in a bad shape since starting a water strike on 6 November. The strike was followed by Alaa being restrained by the security forces, intravenous feeding and self-harm.

=== Use of pretrial detention ===
According to a 2022 report by The New York Times, President El-Sisi has been able to hold political prisoners on a "vastly greater scale" than his predecessors by using pretrial detention. Prisoners can be detained for five months if prosecutors request more time to investigate. After five months, the detainee get a hearing before a terrorism court judge, "who can renew detentions for 45 days at a time. The hearings are closed to the public, even to detainees’ families. Defendants appear in crowded, soundproof glass cages that are muted to keep them from being heard — or even from hearing their own judgments. The 45-day of additional detention "can be renewed repeatedly for up to two years. After that, the law requires that the detainee be released, though that does not always happen. In many cases, prosecutors simply bring a new case, starting the two-year timer all over again."

The Times gave the example of an academic researcher (University of Washington Ph.D. student) Waleed K. Salem who was arrested in Cairo in 2018 while researching the Egyptian judiciary and held for over six months. Salem was never tried or formally charged with a crime, instead he was held in pretrial detention, and "every time he maxed out the legal detention period, a prosecutor extended his imprisonment in a hearing that usually lasted about 90 seconds".

Among the Egyptians arrested in the same crackdown as Salem were "a politician mulling running against Mr. el-Sisi; ... two women on a Cairo subway overheard complaining about rising fares; ... a young conscript who posted a Facebook meme of Mr. el-Sisi wearing Mickey Mouse ears. ... a 14-year-old boy arrested in Giza, a 57-year-old woman arrested at her home in Alexandria, and a 20-year-old man arrested at an architecture office in Suez."

In a years-long campaign by President Abdel Fattah El-Sisi to eliminate opposition to the government, thousands of political prisoners were held without trial for offenses as minor as liking an anti-government Facebook post. No public records exist of the number of prisoners stuck in the pretrial detention system in Egypt. As per the reports, many detainees were locked for long stretches in cells that lack bedding, or toilets and were denied warm clothes in winter, and medical treatment, no matter how sick. More than a thousand people have died in Egyptian custody, owing to treatment that rights groups say amounts to deadly negligence. As of July 2022, human rights groups estimated that Egypt held some 60,000 political prisoners.

== Extrajudicial executions ==
Since 2015 at least 1,700 people have been reported to have disappeared. Most of the victims were abducted from the streets or from their homes and were forcibly isolated from both family and legal aid. Police forces have carried out multiple extrajudicial executions.

Many cases of deaths in custody, forced disappearances and extrajudicial executions have been reported in Egypt.

An investigative report by Reuters news agency published in March 2019 cited figures provided by the Egyptian Interior Ministry's statements from 1 July 2015 to the end of 2018: "In 108 incidents involving 471 men, only six suspects survived... That represents a kill ratio of 98.7 percent. Five members of the security forces were killed.... Thirty seven were injured." The Reuters' analysis of the ministry's statements found that in total "465 men killed in what the Interior Ministry said were shootouts with its forces over a period of three and a half years." The killings began in the aftermath of the assassination of Egypt's chief prosecutor Hisham Barakat, who was an ally of President Abdel Fattah el-Sisi.

According to Kate Vigneswaran, senior legal adviser at the International Commission of Jurists’ Middle East and North Africa programme, the killings described by Reuters “constitute extrajudicial executions".

The Human Rights Watch in its May 2019 report accused the Egyptian military and police forces of committing serious abuses against civilians in the Sinai Peninsula. HRW's investigation revealed that thousands of people have been killed since 2013 and crimes including mass arbitrary arrests, enforced disappearances, torture, extrajudicial killings, and possibly unlawful air and ground attacks against civilians have been prevailing. The Egyptian army has denounced the accusations, claiming that some politicised organisations are trying to tarnish the image of Egypt and its military through "fabricating" such reports.

On 22 October 2020, Human Rights Watch reported that Egyptian authorities had executed 49 people between 3 October to 13 October 2020. According to the report, 15 men were executed for their alleged involvement in cases of political violence, while 32 other men and 2 women were convicted in criminal cases. Reportedly, 13 out of 15 men who were charged for political violence were held and executed in Cairo's Scorpion Prison, which is considered the safest prison in the country. Egyptian authorities alleged that the prisoners were trying to escape. HRW called on the Egyptian authorities to immediately halt the executions.

On 1 December 2020, Amnesty International reported that the Egyptian authorities had executed 57 men and women between the months of October and November, in a “horrifying execution spree”. The number of executions in the last two months were nearly double the number recorded in the whole of 2019. According to the human rights advocacy group, 15 men were executed for causing political violence, while 38 other men were executed under ordinary criminal charges, whereas 2 men were also put to death in October and November month for rape charges.

Egypt became the world's third most frequent executioner in 2020 following China and Iran, according to Amnesty International. Egypt executed at least 107 people in 2020 following grossly unfair trials and forced confessions as lawyers couldn't meet their clients or conduct proper investigations due to the COVID-19 pandemic.

== Enforced disappearances ==
According to the United Nations special rapporteur on Human Rights Defenders, between May 2020 and August 2022, Egypt received the most communications from UN Human Rights office about enforced disappearances than any other country in the world. Enforced disappearance became a systematic and continuous policy used by Egyptian authorities to suppress its opponents from across the political spectrum.

== International complicity ==
Several organizations and individuals have complained about the lack of criticism of Egypt's human rights situation by the international community. In its World Report 2019 Human Rights Watch stated: "Egypt's international allies continue to support Egypt's government and rarely offer public criticism."

In 2015 the Financial Times (FT) warned "Western leaders should think hard before taking their rapprochement with the field marshal [President Sisi] further." Other critics include Luigi Manconi, former president of the human rights commission in the Italian Senate, journalist and author Jack Shenker, and Egyptian journalist and blogger Wael Iskandar.

In 2019, US President Donald Trump said that he did not know about the 2019 Egyptian constitutional referendum but that what he knew was that "Mr. Sisi is doing a great job." Later that year, Trump was overheard referring to Sisi as his "favorite dictator".

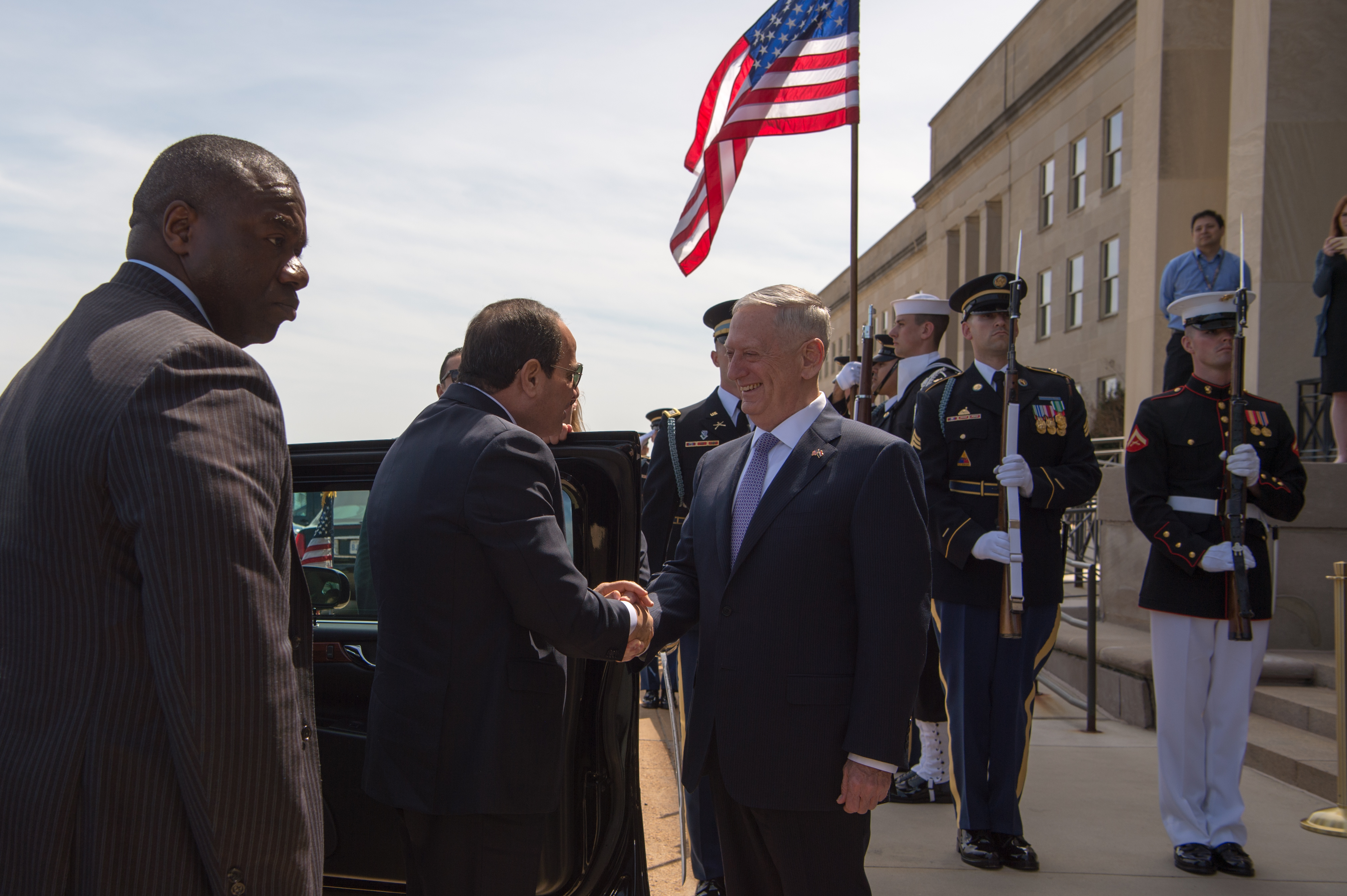
Defense Secretary Jim Mattis meets with President Abdel Fattah el-Sisi during a meeting held at the Pentagon in Washington

In September 2021, Trump's successor, Joe Biden, announced it would withhold $130 million of the $300 million Egypt receives annually in conditioned military aid, and condition the other $170 million to "certain functions, such as counterterrorism, border security and non-proliferation". The move has been described as staking out "a middle path" between a harder stance against human rights violations and support for Sisi's "committed, albeit ruthless" opposition to "militant Islam".

On 21 November 2021, the Disclose exposed the complicity of France in crimes committed by the dictatorship of Abdel Fattah al-Sisi in Egypt. This secret military cooperation exercise between the two countries was called 'Operation Sirli', which was launched in 2016 in the name of the fight against terrorism. However, the original mission was diverted and information from the mission was used by al-Sisi's regime to commit arbitrary executions and to conduct aerial strikes against civilians, killing several hundred. A Luxembourg-based company, CAE Aviation provided the French military intelligence services, DRM, with a plane equipped with surveillance cameras and phone communications interception equipment, called ALSR aircraft. Along with the aircraft, France had disposed a team of men in Egypt.

== Historical situation ==
The following chart shows Egypt's ratings since 1972 in the Freedom in the World reports, published annually by Freedom House. A rating of 1 is "free"; 7, "not free".^{1}

Historical ratings

Year	Political Rights	Civil Liberties	Status	President^{2}
1972	6	6	Not Free	Anwar Sadat
1973	6	6	Not Free	Anwar Sadat
1974	6	4	Partly Free	Anwar Sadat
1975	6	4	Partly Free	Anwar Sadat
1976	5	4	Partly Free	Anwar Sadat
1977	5	4	Partly Free	Anwar Sadat
1978	5	5	Partly Free	Anwar Sadat
1979	5	5	Partly Free	Anwar Sadat
1980	5	5	Partly Free	Anwar Sadat
1981	5	5	Partly Free	Anwar Sadat
1982^{3}	5	5	Partly Free	Hosni Mubarak
1983	5	5	Partly Free	Hosni Mubarak
1984	4	4	Partly Free	Hosni Mubarak
1985	4	4	Partly Free	Hosni Mubarak
1986	5	4	Partly Free	Hosni Mubarak
1987	5	4	Partly Free	Hosni Mubarak
1988	5	4	Partly Free	Hosni Mubarak
1989	5	4	Partly Free	Hosni Mubarak
1990	5	4	Partly Free	Hosni Mubarak
1991	5	5	Partly Free	Hosni Mubarak
1992	5	6	Not Free	Hosni Mubarak
1993	6	6	Not Free	Hosni Mubarak
1994	6	6	Not Free	Hosni Mubarak
1995	6	6	Not Free	Hosni Mubarak
1996	6	6	Not Free	Hosni Mubarak
1997	6	6	Not Free	Hosni Mubarak
1998	6	6	Not Free	Hosni Mubarak
1999	6	5	Not Free	Hosni Mubarak
2000	6	5	Not Free	Hosni Mubarak
2001	6	6	Not Free	Hosni Mubarak
2002	6	6	Not Free	Hosni Mubarak
2003	6	6	Not Free	Hosni Mubarak
2004	6	5	Not Free	Hosni Mubarak
2005	6	5	Not Free	Hosni Mubarak
2006	6	5	Not Free	Hosni Mubarak
2007	6	5	Not Free	Hosni Mubarak
2008	6	5	Not Free	Hosni Mubarak
2009	6	5	Not Free	Hosni Mubarak
2010	6	5	Not Free	Hosni Mubarak
2011	6	5	Not Free	Mohamed Hussein Tantawi
2012	5	5	Partly Free	Mohamed Morsi
2013	6	5	Not Free	Adly Mansour
2014	6	5	Not Free	Abdel Fattah el-Sisi
2015	6	5	Not Free	Abdel Fattah el-Sisi
2016	6	5	Not Free	Abdel Fattah el-Sisi
2017	6	6	Not Free	Abdel Fattah el-Sisi
2018	6	6	Not Free	Abdel Fattah el-Sisi
2019	6	6	Not Free	Abdel Fattah el-Sisi
2020	6	6	Not Free	Abdel Fattah el-Sisi
2021	6	6	Not Free	Abdel Fattah el-Sisi
2022	6	6	Not Free	Abdel Fattah el-Sisi

== International treaties ==
Egypt's stances on international human rights treaties are as follows:

International treaties

Treaty	Organization	Introduced	Signed	Ratified
Convention on the Prevention and Punishment of the Crime of Genocide	United Nations	1948	1948	1952
International Convention on the Elimination of All Forms of Racial Discrimination	United Nations	1966	1966	1967
International Covenant on Economic, Social and Cultural Rights	United Nations	1966	1967	1982
International Covenant on Civil and Political Rights	United Nations	1966	1967	1982
First Optional Protocol to the International Covenant on Civil and Political Rights	United Nations	1966	-	-
Convention on the Non-Applicability of Statutory Limitations to War Crimes and Crimes Against Humanity	United Nations	1968	-	-
International Convention on the Suppression and Punishment of the Crime of Apartheid	United Nations	1973	-	1977
Convention on the Elimination of All Forms of Discrimination against Women	United Nations	1979	1980	1981
Convention against Torture and Other Cruel, Inhuman or Degrading Treatment or Punishment	United Nations	1984	-	1986
Convention on the Rights of the Child	United Nations	1989	1990	1990
Second Optional Protocol to the International Covenant on Civil and Political Rights, aiming at the abolition of the death penalty	United Nations	1989	-	-
International Convention on the Protection of the Rights of All Migrant Workers and Members of Their Families	United Nations	1990	-	1993
Optional Protocol to the Convention on the Elimination of All Forms of Discrimination against Women	United Nations	1999	-	-
Optional Protocol to the Convention on the Rights of the Child on the Involvement of Children in Armed Conflict	United Nations	2000	-	2007
Optional Protocol to the Convention on the Rights of the Child on the Sale of Children, Child Prostitution and Child Pornography	United Nations	2000	-	2002
Convention on the Rights of Persons with Disabilities	United Nations	2006	2007	2008
Optional Protocol to the Convention on the Rights of Persons with Disabilities	United Nations	2006	-	-
International Convention for the Protection of All Persons from Enforced Disappearance	United Nations	2006	-	-
Optional Protocol to the International Covenant on Economic, Social and Cultural Rights	United Nations	2008	-	-
Optional Protocol to the Convention on the Rights of the Child on a Communications Procedure	United Nations	2011	-	-

== Travel bans ==
As stated by Amnesty International, the Egyptian authorities are pursuing serious assaults on Egypt's embattled human rights movement. Instead of responding to calls to close the decade long Case 173 and lift arbitrary travel bans imposed on innocent people, the country's courts are repeatedly rejecting appeals by human right defenders against the restrictive measures against them.

According to the Human Rights Watch, arbitrary and open-ended travel bans enable the Egyptian authorities to repress human rights defenders or the key members of civil society who oppose the government. There's no clear way to challenge these bans in court. Travel bans applied as punishments for peaceful work of human rights lawyers, journalists, feminists, and researchers are repressive and a human rights abuse. The bans impose a life-altering system of punishment to the critics of the Egyptian government, while separating families, damaging careers, and harming the mental health of those subjected to them.

== See also ==
- Religion in Egypt
- Persecution of Copts
- Human trafficking in Egypt
- Human rights in Islamic countries

== Notes ==
1.Note that the "Year" signifies the "Year covered". Therefore, the information for the year marked 2008 is from the report published in 2009, and so on.
2.As of January 1.
3.The 1982 report covers the year 1981 and the first half of 1982, and the following 1984 report covers the second half of 1982 and the whole of 1983. In the interest of simplicity, these two aberrant "year and a half" reports have been split into three year-long reports through interpolation.
