= EuroMed Rights =

Network of human rights organizations based in Europe and the Mediterranean region

- Abbreviation: EuroMed Rights
- Established: 1997 (29 years ago)
- Types: nonprofit organization
- Legal status: non-profit organisation
- Aim: human rights
- Headquarters: Copenhagen
- Location: Mediterranean Basin
- Country: Denmark
- Revenue: 4,043,547 (2019)
- Expenses: 4 million (2020)
- Website: euromedrights.org

EuroMed Rights, formerly the Euro-Mediterranean Human Rights Network is a network of 68 to 80 human rights organizations, institutions and individuals based in 30 countries in Europe and the Mediterranean region. It was established in 1997 (or 1995) in response to the Barcelona Declaration, which led to the establishment of the Euromediterranean Partnership.

The members of EuroMed Rights admit to universal human rights principles and are convinced of the value of cooperation and dialogue across and within borders. EuroMed Rights promotes networking, cooperation and development of partnerships between human rights NGOs, activists and a wider civil society.

== Aims and achievements ==
EuroMed Rights was created in relation to the existence of the inter-governmental Euromediterranean Partnership (EMP), and in particular, the Barcelona Process proposed by the EMP. EuroMed Rights' role is primarily as an intermediary between governmental institutions and grassroots human rights organisations. It received most of its funding during its first years from governmental sources and is closely linked to the EuroMed Civil Forums that constitutes a relatively government-linked alternative to the grassroots Alternative Mediterranean Conference that was organised in 1995. As of 2008, EuroMed Rights had become well recognised both by European Union (EU) institutions and NGOs. Its activities range from communication among NGO members and activist campaigning through to lobbying of institutions.

In August 2026, the organization criticized mechanisms for returning undocumented migrants from European Union countries, under which return centers are planned to be established in a number of African countries, with Uganda and Rwanda reported as possible locations. EuroMed's Director of Advocacy, Sara Prestianni, stated that human rights violations had been documented in the countries being considered.

In June 2026, the EU Migration and Asylum Pact entered into application, under which responsibility for examining an asylum application generally lies with the EU country through which the asylum seeker first entered. Italian Prime Minister Giorgia Meloni supported the new pact while promoting a strict immigration policy, which drew criticism from Sara Prestianni, who argued that migrants seeking to reach a specific EU country could face prolonged legal uncertainty lasting from several months to years.

EuroMed Rights describes itself as a regional forum for human rights NGOs and a pool of expertise on promotion, protection and strengthening of human rights. Its online library is an important collection of press releases, statements, open letters and reports about the Euro-Mediterranean region.

It states that it brings people together in inter-cultural settings to promote dialogue and understanding, with stress on the following subjects:

- lobbying human rights mechanisms within the European Union (EU) and the Euromediterranean Partnership, especially concerning the association agreements with the Mediterranean Partners and the European Neighbourhood Policy
- supporting reform processes in the Arab world by strengthening democratization processes originating from the civil society
- working towards transforming the non-European Mediterranean region into states of law, especially by backing movements for the enforcement of the freedoms of speech and assembly
- bringing human rights values and principles as well as women’s rights and the idea of public education to the public in order to achieve a broad popular participation in changing the living conditions where human rights are abused or denied
- sending of delegations and observers, and publishing urgent alerts in cases of deterioration of human rights and when members are in danger or imprisoned
- close and critical monitoring of the own efforts of the EU
- information on human rights violations in North Africa and the Middle East by publishing reports, policy papers and newsletters
- research and training by means of training seminars and workshops

== History ==
- December 1997: The Euro-Mediterranean Human Rights Network was founded during a meeting at the Danish Centre for Human Rights (DHRC) in Copenhagen by a group of human rights activists from the North and the South of the Mediterranean. Founding people were then director of the DHRC, Morten Kjærum, and Said Essoulami from Moroccan human rights organisation CMF-MENA. Further participants in the founding assembly (but no members of the EMHRN) were the Dutch Council for Refugees, the Egyptian Organization for Human Rights, and the European Council on Refugees and Exiles.
- 1999: The network co-organised the EuroMed Civil Forum in Stuttgart.
- 2000: The EMHRN received a European Union funding contract. On its fourth General Assembly in Marseille, a new action plan was adopted, which saw the network multiplying its activities. In the following years, an office in Brussels was opened and preparations for offices in Rabat and Amman were taken. More staff in addition to the Executive Director were hired.
- 2004: The Euro-Mediterranean Foundation for the Protection of Human Rights (EMHRF) was established.
- 2006: During the European Ministerial Conference in Istanbul a five-year plan for promotion of the role of the women in society was adopted, which included proposals carried out by the EMHRN.
- 2015: The Euro-Mediterranean Human Rights Network (EMHRN) becomes EuroMed Rights.
- 2017: EuroMed Rights celebrated its twentieth anniversary
- 2018: The 11th General Assembly of EuroMed Rights elects Wadih Al-Asmar, President of the Lebanese Center for Human Rights, as its new president.
- 2024: Tunisian human rights activist Monia EL Jemia, a former president of the Tunisian Association of Democratic Women (ATFD), became president of the network.
- In August 2026, Moataz El Fegiery, an Egyptian academic and activist who had previously served as vice president, assumed the presidency.

== Structure ==
EuroMed Rights (formerly known as the Euro-Mediterranean Human Rights Network) has the following members:

Country	Organisation
Algeria	Coalition of families of the disappeared in Algeria (CFDA); Algerian league for the defence of human rights (LADDH); National autonomous union of public administration staff (SNAPAP)
Austria	Bruno Kreisky Foundation for Human Rights
Bulgaria	Center for legal aid – voice in Bulgaria
Cyprus	Mediterranean Institute for Gender Studies at University of Nicosia; Action for equality, support, antiracism (KISA)
Czech Republic	People in Need
Denmark	Danish Institute for Human Rights; Dignity; The Danish center for research and information on gender, equality and diversity (KVINFO)
Egypt	Andalus institute for tolerance and anti-violence studies (AITAS)
Finland	Tampere Peace Research Institute at University of Tampere
France	Tunisian federation for a two banks citizenship Human Rights League (France); National federation solidarity with women (FNSF); Education League
Greece	Greek Committee for International Democratic Solidarity; Greek council for refugees (GCR)
Ireland	80:20 Education and Acting for a Better World
Israel; Occupied Palestinian Territories	The Legal Center for Arab Minority Rights in Israel (ADALAH); Arab Association for Human Rights; B'Tselem; Public Committee Against Torture in Israel; Al Mezan Center for Human Rights; Al-Haq; Palestinian Centre for Human Rights; Women’s centre for legal aid and counseling (WCLAC)
Italy	ARCI Association; Italian Refugee Council
Jordan	Amman Center for Human Rights Studies; Sisterhood is Global Institute; ARDD – legal aid organization Mizan law group for Human Rights
Lebanon	Palestinian Human Rights Organization in Lebanon; Institute for Human Rights (IHR) – Beirut Bar Association; Lebanese Center for Human Rights (CLDH)
Malta	Mediterranean Academy of Diplomatic Studies at University of Malta
Morocco; Western Sahara	Democratic association of women from Morocco (ADFM); Moroccan Association of Human Rights; Espace Associatif; Moroccan Organisation of Human Rights; Adala
Portugal	Portuguese human rights league – civitas (LPDHC)
Spain	CEAR – Spanish commission for refugees Institute of Human Rights in Catalonia; Federation of associations for the defence and the promotion of human rights (FADPHR); SUDS – internacionalisme solidaritat feminismes
Sweden	Kvinna till Kvinna
Syria	Committees for the Defense of Democracy Freedoms and Human Rights in Syria; Damascus Center for Human Rights Studies; Damascus Center for Theoretical and Civil Rights Studies; The Syrian organization for human rights (SWASIAH); Syrian Center for Media and Freedom of Expression (SCM)
Tunisia	Tunisian Association of the Democratic Women; Tunisian Human Rights League; Committee for the Respect of Freedom and Human Rights in Tunisia; Tunisian Forum for Economic and Social Rights (FTDES)
Turkey	Human Rights Association (Turkey); Citizen Assembly
United Kingdom	Bar Human Rights Committee of England and Wales (BHRCEW); Human Rights Centre at University of Essex; Solicitors international human rights group (SIHRG)
Regional Members	European association for the defence of human rights (AEDH); Arabic network for human rights information (ANHRI); Arab institute for human rights (AIHR); Collectif 95 – Maghreb Egalité; Cairo institute for human rights studies (CIHRS); African and Middle East refugee assistance (AMERA)
Associate Members	Amnesty International (EU Office); International Federation for Human Rights; Human Rights Watch; World Organisation Against Torture; Women’s international league for peace and freedom (WILPF); International bar association’s human rights institute (IBAHRI); Norwegian Helsinki Committee [www.apt.ch Association for the prevention of torture (APT)]

== See also ==
- Euro-Mediterranean Human Rights Monitor
