= IFIS =

IFIS may refer to:

- International flag identification symbol, used to indicate characteristics of flags
- Intraoperative floppy iris syndrome, a medical condition
- Islamic Association in Sweden, a religious organization based in Sweden
