= Bahey Hassan =

Egyptian human rights activist

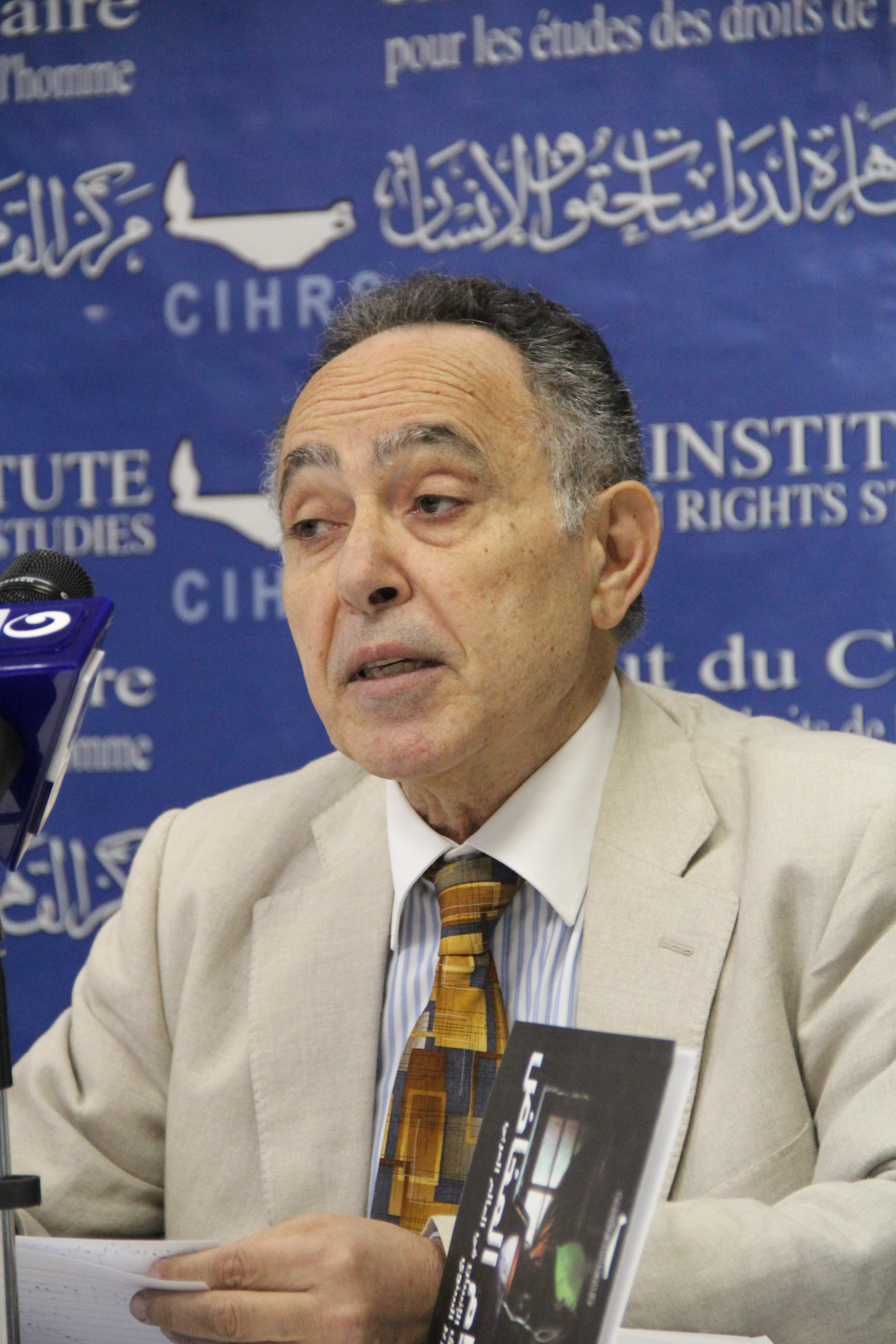
Bahey eldin Hassan at the Cairo Institute for Human Rights Studies Cairo office

Bahey eldin Hassan is an Egyptian human rights defender and one of the founders of the Egyptian human rights movement in the 1980s. Hassan currently serves as the director of the Cairo Institute for Human Rights Studies (CIHRS), which he cofounded in 1993. In 2014, and after receiving death threats for his human rights work, Hassan had to leave Egypt and currently lives in self-imposed exile in France. Hassan is also a journalist, lecturer, author and editor of several published articles, papers and books on human rights and democratic transformation in the Arab region.

== Human Rights Career ==
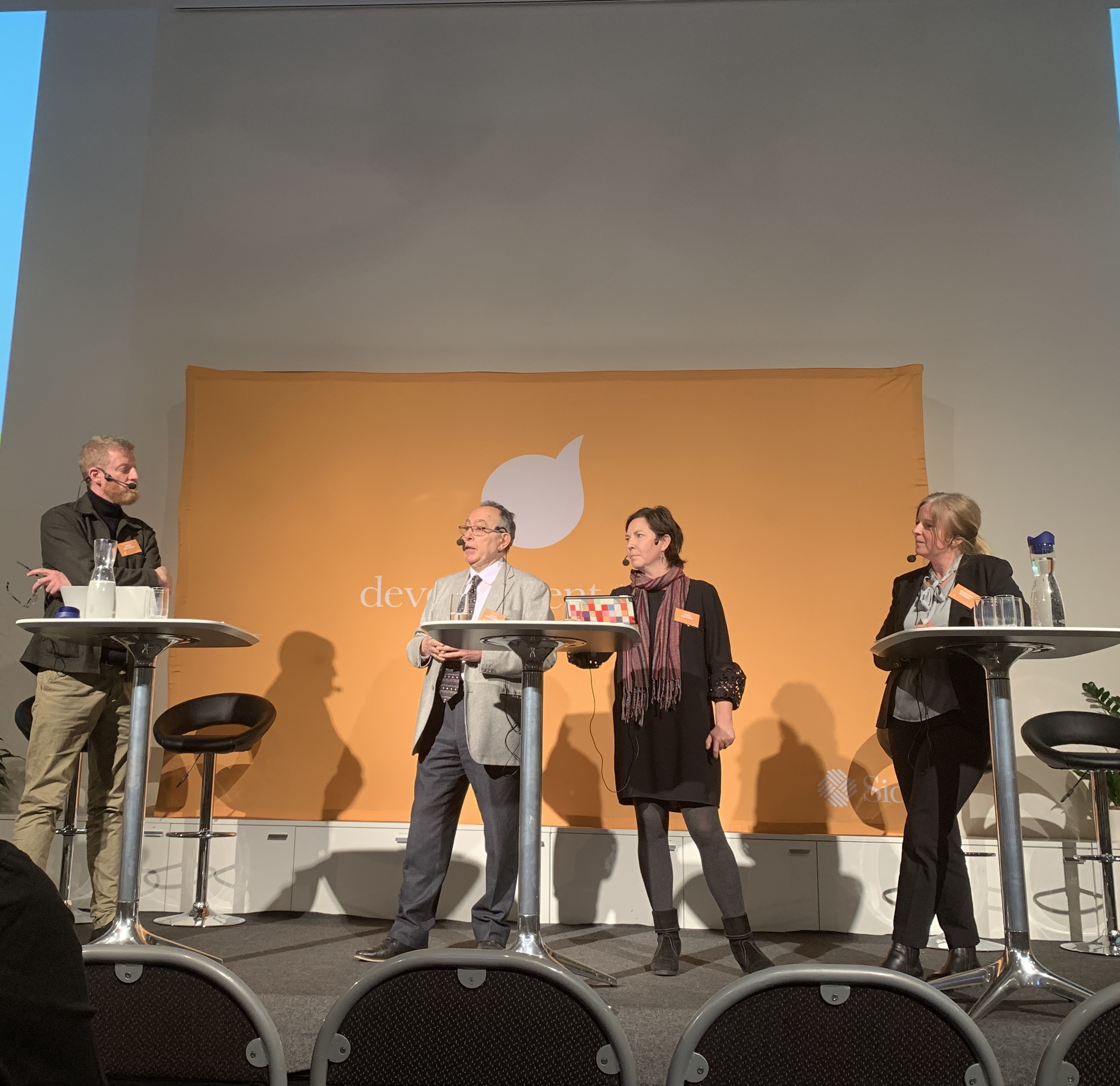
Bahey Eldin Hassan presenting at Development Talks in Stockholm - 2020

Hassan started his human rights career in 1983 after joining the Press Syndicate's Freedoms committee. In 1985, Hassan joined the Egyptian Organization for Human Rights (EOHR) and was elected in 1986 as a board member. Hassan chose to ignore warnings from the authorities to shut down the organization, since the Egyptian government is a party to several UN human rights conventions, and as such had no right to demand the closure of the organization. Ironically enough, human rights organizations in Egypt are facing the same threats in 2016. In 1988, after a debate among board members, followed by an institutional consultation with members of EOHR on whether to heed the authorities' warning or not, Hassan was elected as the Secretary General of EOHR, marking the beginning of a transformation in its discourse and mission, as it also started to document abuses against Islamists and advocate for their rights, despite the organization's strong secular orientation. It's noteworthy that the first detailed report on torture to be issued by an Egyptian organization was released under Hassan's time as Secretary General, as well as the first time for an Egyptian NGO to submit reports and complaints to the UN. It is during that period that other prominent human right defenders and intellectuals such as Mohamed el Sayed Said and Negad El Borai established a working relationship with Hassan.

In 1993, Hassan along with Mohamed el Sayed Said founded the Cairo Institute for Human Rights Studies (CIHRS) as a human rights NGO with a regional geographic mandate in the Arab region. The underlying philosophy behind the CIHRS was to disseminate and entrench human rights culture within the Egyptian and Arab cultures to create a process of progressive change. Stemming from this philosophy, one of CIHRS' first activities was its Annual Human Rights Summer Course for university students as well as other programs such as Political Islam and Human rights and Arts and Literature in Human Rights, with the overarching objective of instilling and rooting the universal values of human rights across all spectrum's of the Arab societies and cultures. Over the years, Hassan oversaw the expansion of CIHRS from a Cairo-based human rights organization into the largest Arab human rights organization, with representations in Cairo, Tunis, Geneva, and Brussels, with the latter two entirely dedicated to advocacy work with the UN and the EU. In 2004, Hassan reluctantly accepted joining the board of the quasi-governmental National Council for Human Rights (NCHR). However, after serving a turbulent three-year term characterized by his public criticism of NCHR and the government, Hassan refused to serve a second term and publicly resigned, citing the persistent lack of independence of NCHR. After the oust of former President Hosni Mubarak and under the rule of the Supreme Council of the Armed Forces (SCAF), Hassan was offered to serve as deputy to the Minister of Interior for Human Rights, however he declined out of scepticism towards Egypt's trajectory under SCAF. Hassan also refused to re-join the NCHR, once during President Mohamed Morsi's tenure and another time under the-military backed government in 2013–2014.

== Death Threat, Exile, Asset Freeze, and Prison Sentence ==
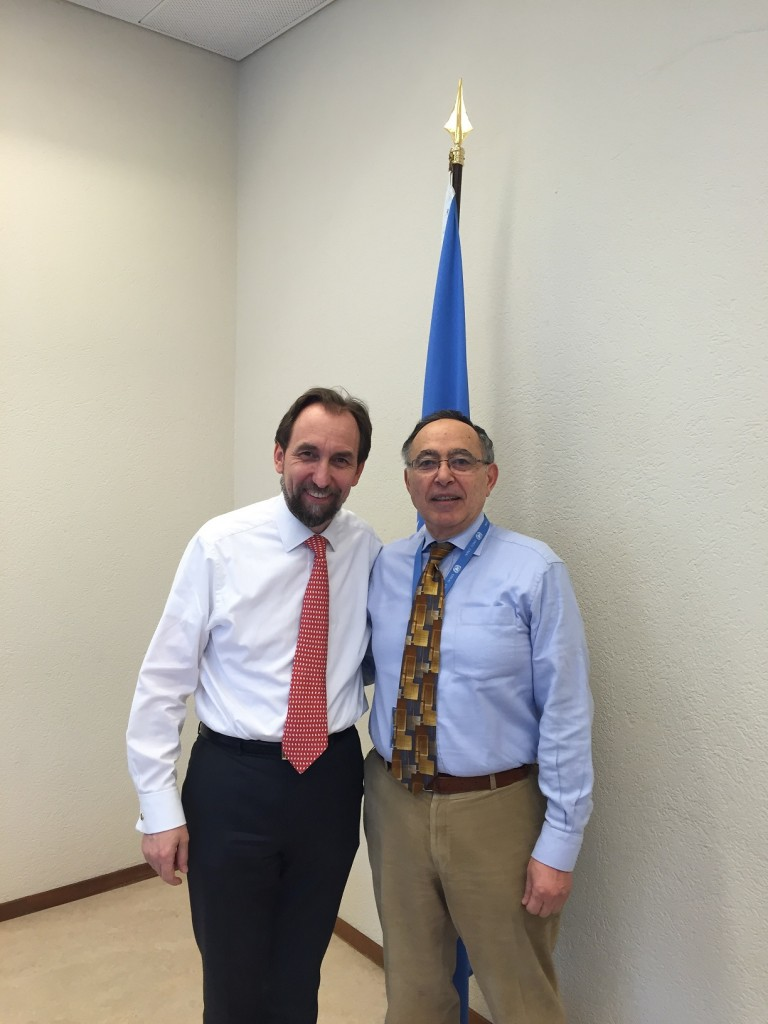
UN High Commissioner for Human Rights Zeid Ra'd and Bahey eldin Hassan meeting in Geneva, Switzerland in 2016

In 2014, two weeks after the inauguration of Egypt's President field marshal Abdelfatah al-Sisi, Hassan received a death threat purportedly for his engagement in bilateral meetings with high level international officials on the human rights situation in Egypt. For his own safety, and after receiving advice to do so by NGOs, academics, and senior diplomats inside and outside of Egypt, including from UN officials, Hassan left Egypt for self-imposed exile in France where he has been since 2014.

In retaliation for his human rights work, media presenters associated with Egyptian security agencies called on the Egyptian authorities to "deal with him [Bahey el-Din Hassan] the same way the Russian spy was dealt with," in reference to the nerve agent attack on Serjei Skripal in the United Kingdom.

In April 2016, and although never being formally notified, Hassan learned from the media that in relation to the notorious Foreign Funding Case targeting Egyptian human rights NGOs, a court is looking into an asset freeze order against him, his wife, two minor daughters, and his adult daughter who's married to renowned Egyptian activist and blogger Alaa Abdelfattah. After serving a five-year prison sentence and facing threats of a longer sentence, for taking part in a protest against the constitutionalizing of military trial of civilians, and after an extensive effort by his supporters, Abdelfatah was allowed to join his family in the UK.

In August 2020, an Egyptian court sentenced Hassan to 15 years in jail for "publishing false news" and "insulting the judiciary," in addition to an earlier three years sentence issued in September 2019, for a separate case with the same charges. The sentence was widely criticized, including by the UN High Commissioner for Human Rights, the European Parliament, and hundreds of public figures, journalists, academics, artists, and intellectuals from across the world. The sentence was also criticized by the United States, France, Sweden, Finland, Germany, Netherlands, Spain, Luxembourg, and the UK as well as prominent human rights organizations including Human Rights Watch, Amnesty International, and FIDH.

== Views on contemporary Middle Eastern Issues ==
=== The Arab Spring ===
Hassan views the Arab Spring as the natural outcome of decades of oppression, corruption, unrealized social, political and economic aspirations, as well as decades of resistance to any meaningful reform. He attributes the instability that ensued the Arab Spring and rise of terrorist groups in the region to the institutional failure that persisted in Arab countries for decades under its former dictators. In several of his writings, Hassan argued that for as long as the grievances that fuelled the Arab Spring are not addressed, any form of stability achieved will remain unsustainable. Hassan has also called for the establishment of an internal UN mechanism supervised by the Secretary General to address the situation in the Middle East.

=== Terrorism ===
Hassan attributes the proliferation of terrorism in the Arab region and through the rest of the world, to the continued failure in addressing the root causes of the problem and over relying on security approaches from as far back as the 9/11 attacks. Hassan points out in his writings that the root causes of terrorism and radicalization lie in poor governance and rule of law; political, social and economic marginalization; rampant human rights violations; and the ongoing degradation of international human rights and humanitarian frameworks. Hassan has also constantly criticized Arab governmental religious institutions, especially al-Azhar and the Wahabi establishment, due to the fact that "elements of extremists' narratives could be traced to the discourse of some Arab states' official religious establishments." The use of terrorism by autocratic governments as an excuse for oppression and crackdown on peaceful dissent, as well as the use of heavy-handed security approaches to deal with terrorism, are seen by Hassan as factors that will only continue to exacerbates the situation and increase radicalization.

=== Political Islam ===
Despite his strong criticism of the Egyptian Muslim Brotherhood before and during President Morsi's one-year rule of Egypt in 2013, Hassan believes that Islamist's represent an array of different views and as such, the position from each Islamist group should depend on their stances from violence, democracy and pluralism, as well as civil liberties and personal freedoms. Another important factor according to Hassan is how strongly some Islamist groups match their pro-democracy rhetoric with actions and policies.

=== Civil-Military Relations ===
Hassan believes that reforming the military-civil relations in the Arab region is a perquisite to durable stability in the region. He also partly attributes Tunisia's status as the success story of the Arab Spring, to the positive role played by the military during the democratic transition.

== Membership in other organizations ==
Besides being the director of the CIHRS, Hassan is also a member of the boards and advisory committees of several other human rights organizations such as the Euro Mediterranean Foundation of Support to Human Rights Defenders (EMHRF), Human Rights Watch (HRW) Middle East and North Africa Division, International Center for Transitional Justice (ICTJ). He's also one of the founding members of EMHRF and the Euro Mediterranean Human Rights Network (EMHRN). Hassan is also Chief Adviser of the Egyptian Human Rights Forum.

== Awards Received ==
• Human Rights Watch's annual Human Rights Defender Award (1993)

• Egyptian Press Syndicate's annual award (1987)

== Books ==
• Reflections on Human Rights Before and After the Arab Spring, Routledge Handbook on Human Rights and the Middle East and North Africa, ed. Anthony Chase, Routledge International Handbooks 2016

• The Arab Spring on Trial, in "Cairo Institute for Human Rights Studies 2014 Annual Report", Arabic version ed. Bahey eldin Hassan, CIHRS 2015

• What Prospects for the "Arab Spring" in Light of an Early "Autumn" of Political Islam?, in "Delivering Democracy" Arabic version ed. Bahey eldin Hassan, CIHRS 2013

• The Arab Spring: A Struggle on Three Fronts, in "Fractured Walls… New Horizons," Arabic version ed. Bahey eldin Hassan, CIHRS 2012

• Delivering Democracy- human rights in the Arab world: the annual report 2012 (in Arabic and English)

• A Prospect for Democratic Uprising in the Arab World in"Human Rights in the Middle East: Frameworks, Goals, and Strategies", ed. Dr Mahmood Monshipouri, Palgrave Macmillan, USA, 2011

• Fall of the barriers - human rights in the Arab world: the annual report 2011.

• Roots of the revolution – human rights in the Arab world: annual report 2010 (in Arabic and English).

• The Human Rights Dilemma in Egypt: Political Will or Islam? in "Beitraege zum Islamischen Recht" [Contributions to Islamic Law], ed. Hatem Elliesie, Peter Lang Publishing Group, New York, Berlin, Oxford, et al. 2010

• The Future of the Arab Region trapped between a Failed State and a Religious State in "Bastion of Impunity, Mirage of Reform" Arabic version ed. Bahey eldin Hassan, CIHRS 2010

• The Dilemma of Human Rights between a Lack of Political Will and the Emerging Forms of Resistance, in "From Exporting Terrorism to Exporting Repression: Human Rights in the Arab Region," Arabic version ed. Bahey eldin Hassan, CIHRS 2009

• Oasis of Escaping Accountability and Punishment - Human Rights in the Arab world: the Annual report 2009: (in Arabic, English, and French)

• A Nation without Citizens! Constitutional Amendments in the Balance: Bahey El Din Hassan, Salah Issa, Dr. Amr Hamzawy, Dr. Mohammed Sayed Said, Moataz El Fegiery, Dr. Huwaida Adly. 2007

• A Question of Human Rights Ethics: Defending the Islamist's, in "Human Rights in the Arab World: Independent Voices", ed. Anthony Chase & Amr Hamzawy, University of Pennsylvania Press, USA, 2006

• Regional Protection of Human Rights in the Arab States In Statu Nascendi, in "Human Rights: International Protection, Monitoring, Enforcement," ed. Janusz Symonides, UNESCO, 2003

• Our Rights Now, not Tomorrow - Basic Charters of Human Rights: Bahey Eldin Hassan, and Mohamed Elsayed Said (fourth edition) 2003

• Terrorism and human rights after September 11 (in English) 2002

• Arabs between repression inside and injustice abroad: presented and edited by Bahey Eldin Hassan (in Arabic, English and French) 2000

• Challenges of the Arab Human Rights Movement: edited by Bahey El Din Hassan (in Arabic and English) 1997

• Freedom of the press from a human rights perspective: Presented by Mohamed Elsayed Said, edited by Bahey El Din Hassan 1995
