= Salah Sultan =

Egyptian preacher (born c. 1960)

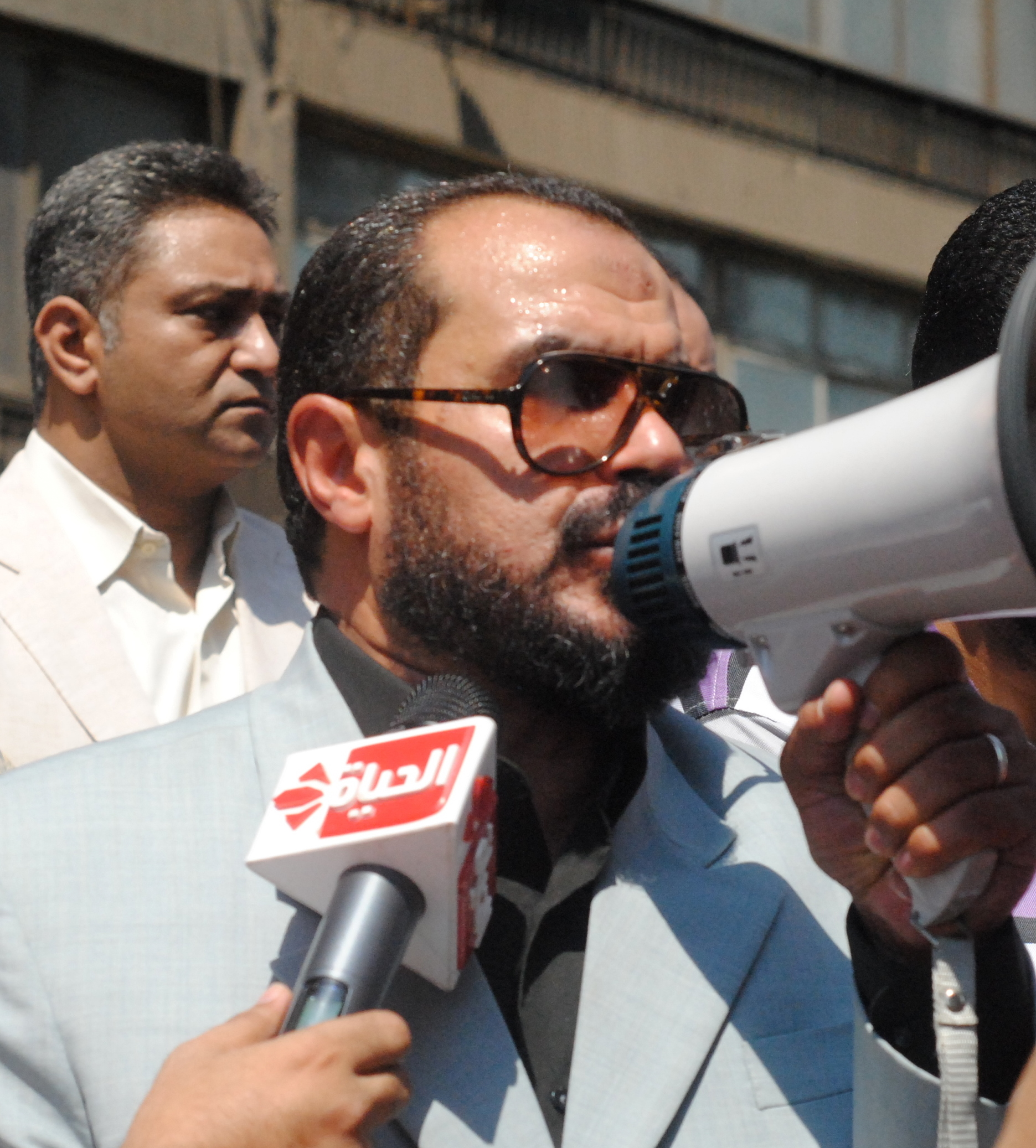
Salah Sultan in 2011

Salah Sultan (also transliterated Salah Soltan; born c. 1960) is an Islamic scholar, preacher, and academic. Among the titles and positions he has held are professor of Islamic Law at Cairo University, secretary general of Egypt's Supreme Council for Islamic Affairs, president of the American Center for Islamic Research, Columbus, Ohio, and member of the European Council for Fatwa and Research, member of the Fiqh Council of North America (FCNA), and a "senior member" of the international Muslim Brotherhood.

He was known in Egypt as "one of the most respected Islamic scholars in the country", but then was sentenced to death after being found guilty of inciting murder in March 2015, in a case known as the "Rabaa control room" or "Rabaa Operation Trial".

== Biography ==
Born in Egypt, Soltan attended Ohio State University in the United States, and graduated with a degree in economics. He returned to Egypt to work as a business manager at a petroleum services company, his daughter Hanaa Soltan stated in 2013. He later became a professor of Islamic Law at Cairo University. Returning to the United States where he lived and worked in the US for over a decade and became a legal US permanent resident, he founded and served as the president of the Islamic American University in Dearborn, Michigan from 1999 to 2004. He has been accused of extremism by some websites, and referred to as a "controversial" figure by the Los Angeles Times for his activities in Bahrain.

In 2013 he returned to Egypt and participated in protests against the 2013 military coup deposing elected president Mohamed Morsi, tweeting often about his activities. He was arrested in September 2013 for his dissent. He was among over 50 leading members of the Muslim Brotherhood charged with setting up a "control room" to direct "violence and chaos" across Egypt during the unrest following the 2013 military coup that overthrew Muslim Brotherhood President Mohamed Morsi. In September 2017 an Egyptian court sentenced him to life in prison following a "mass trial marred by extensive due process and fair trial violations".

As of 2023, it was reported by Human Rights Watch that he was imprisoned in Badr 1 prison, suffering from "life-threatening heart and liver diseases among other complex medical conditions" and "deprived" of adequate health care.

Sultan has participated in conferences organized by the Islamic Association in Sweden, which has been led by Omar Mustafa and Abdirizak Waberi. His participation has been the subject of criticism.

His sons, including Mohamed Soltan and grandchildren are all US citizens. Mohamed, like his father, is an Egyptian American activist.

== Protests against his treatment ==
According to the Middle East Studies Association Committee on Academic Freedom, Sultan

was arrested on 21 September 2013 and charged with inciting violence, being part of a terrorist organization, plotting to cause chaos, and spreading false information. He was later sentenced to death and life in prison in two mass trials, namely Case No. 2210/2014, also known as the "Rabaa Operation Trial," and Case No. 8615/2013, also known as "Al-Fateh Mosque Trial."

On 14 September 2022, MESA sent a letter to Egyptian officials protesting Sultan's treatment, the Egyptian judicial process, lack of medical treatment, etc. and calling for his release.
