= Abdirizak Waberi =

Somali–Swedish politician (born 1966)

Member of the Swedish parliament for Gothenburg Municipality
- In office 4 October 2010 – October 2014

Personal details
- Born: 7 May 1966 (age 60) Somalia
- Party: Moderate Party in Sweden (- 2014); National Unity Party in Somalia (2017 - )
- Children: 5 children
- Website: waberi.se

Abdirizak Waberi (born 7 May 1966) is a Somali–Swedish Moderate Party politician. He was a member of the Swedish parliament from the 2010 election until the next election in 2014, representing the Gothenburg Municipality constituency.

Since 2017 Waberi is the leader of the National Unity Party in Somalia which is described as Islamist.

== Biography ==
Waberi was born in Somalia. Prior to entering politics, he worked as a principal at the Römosseskolan Islamic private elementary school in Gothenburg. The school teaches Islamic doctrine two hours a week, more than other schools. It is taught that a man can have many wives, which is contrary to the values of the Swedish education system which specifies equality between men and women. The institution was criticized by the Swedish School Inspectorate (Skolinspektionen) for its unusual grading pattern, wherein all the ninth grade boys within the system graduated with full marks and were eligible to apply for college, while a lower 71% of girls graduated with full marks. This was in contrast to the gender ratio typically seen in other local schools in Sweden, where the girls tended to outperform the boys. In 2021 the school was closed as it was found it had channeled public school funds to Somalia.

In the 2010 election, Waberi was elected to the Swedish parliament, representing the Gothenburg Municipality constituency. He was a deputy member of the legislature's Committee on Defence.

Waberi has served as the vice president of Federation of Islamic Organizations in Europe (FIOE), where he headed the citizenship and public relations duties.

In addition, Waberi has served as the chairman of several organizations, including the Islamic Association in Sweden, Muslim Political Forum and Islamic Schools of Sweden. He is also a member of the board of the Muslim Council of Sweden.

According to researcher Stig Jarle Hansen at Norwegian University of Life Sciences in 2021, Waberi leads the National Unity Party in Somalia which was founded by Muslim Brotherhood profile Abdurahman Abdullahi Baadiyow.

Waberi lives in Angered, Gothenburg. He is married, with five children.

== Religious views ==
In a 2006 interview by the Ottar magazine published by the Swedish Association for Sexuality Education (RFSU), he stated that according to the Quran, that a man may have up to four wives. He also stated a man is capable of loving four wives, but that woman cannot love four men. According to Waberi, Islam teaches that a Muslim man may marry a woman of a different religion, but a Muslim woman must marry a Muslim man.

== Leader of National Unity Party ==
Since 2017 Waberi leads the National Unity Party. The party claims to advocate a modern interpretation of Islam and rejects the violent aspects and movements of the religion. The party is Islamist in nature as the top of the party's programme says that sharia law shall become the basis of the legal system.

== Prison sentence ==
On 29 April 2022, Waberi was sentenced by Gothenburg District Court to four years and six months in prison for, among other things, aggravated embezzlement. According to the chief prosecutor, around twelve million kronor in school funding was diverted, and a large part of the surplus was sent to two organizations in Somalia. Waberi denied wrongdoing and appealed the District Court's entire verdict.
