= Hafez Abu Seada =

Egyptian politician (1965–2020)

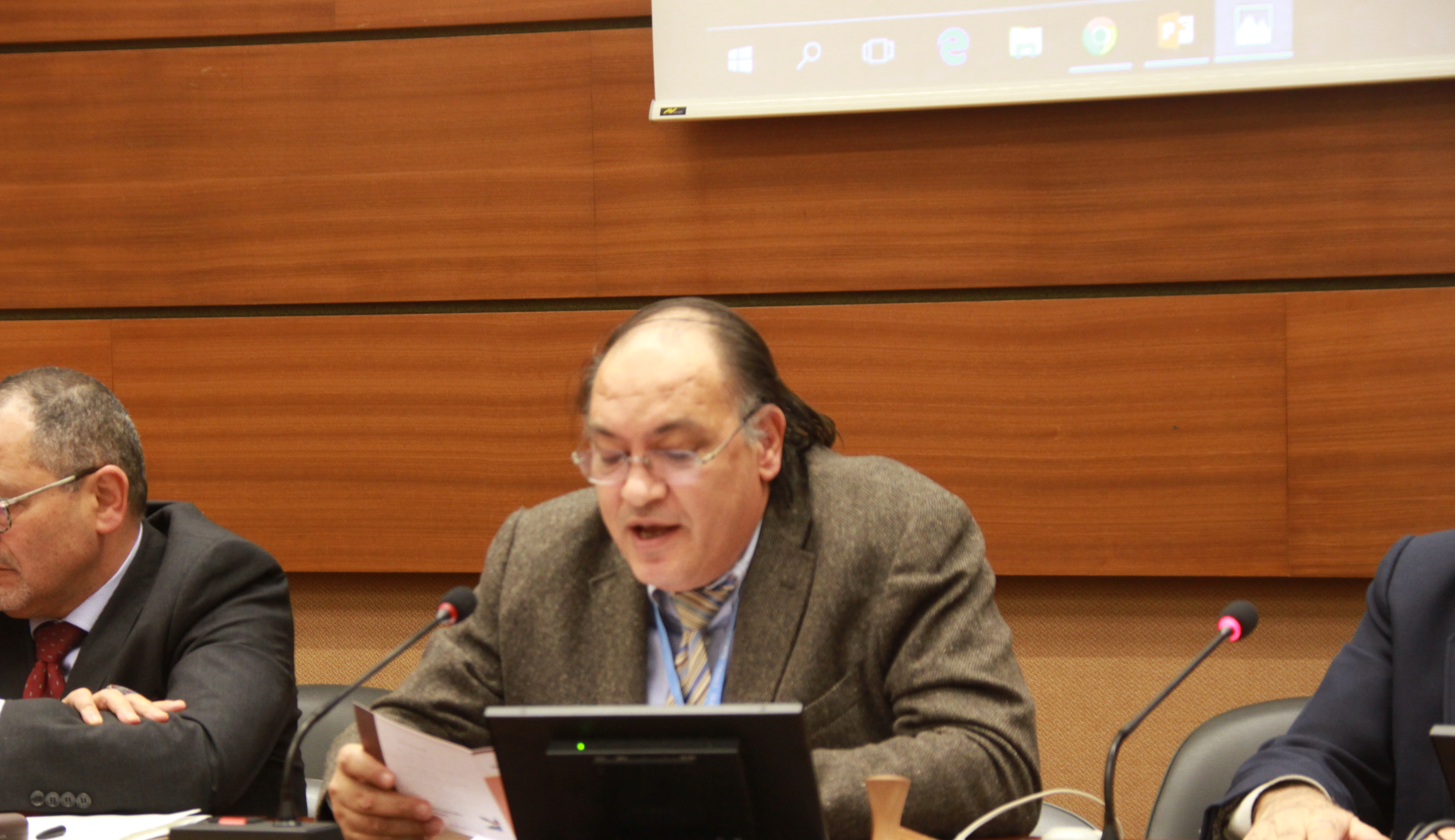
Hafez Abu Seada

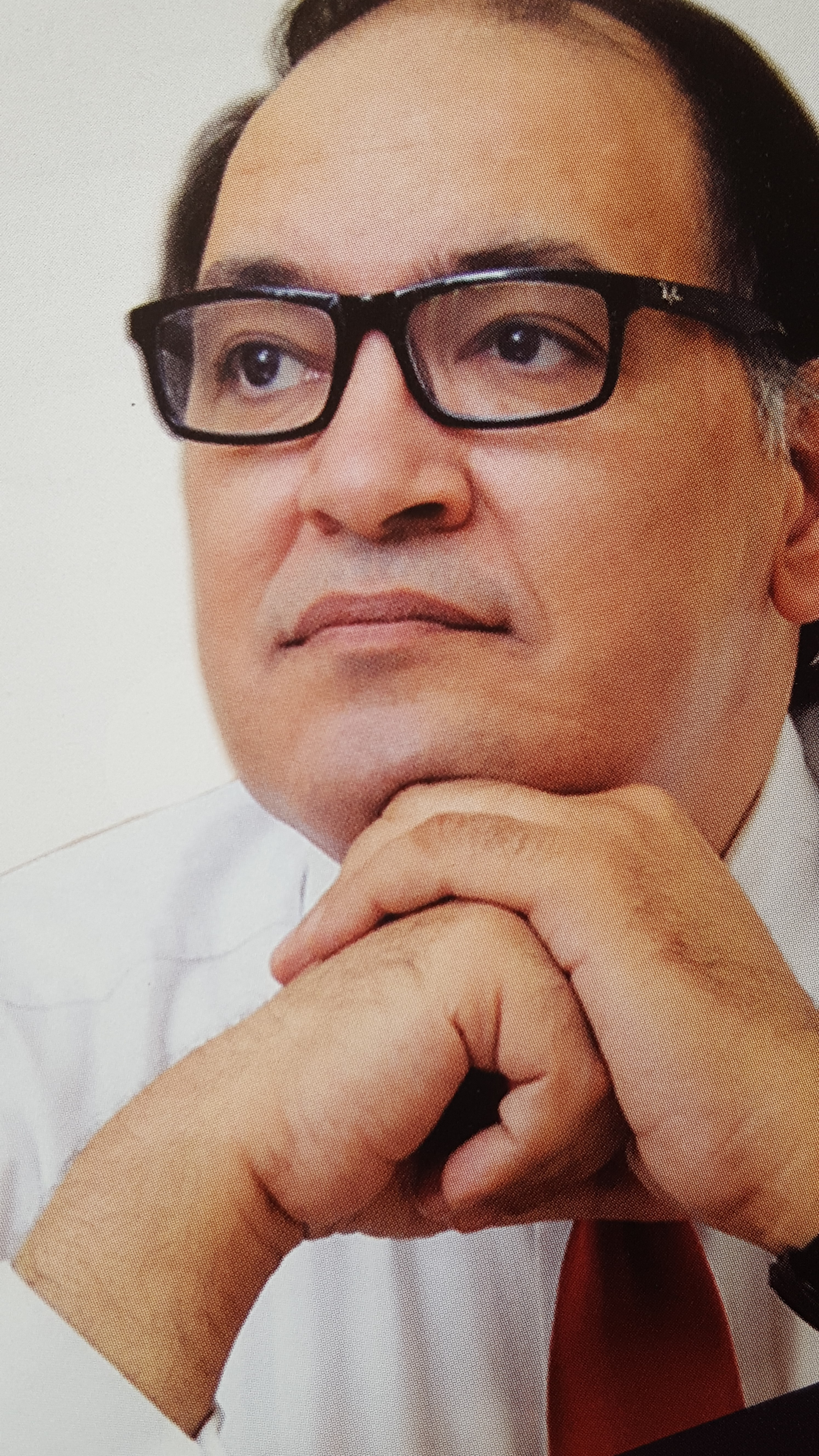
Hafez Abu Seada

Hafez Abu Seada (Arabic: حافظ أبو سعدة; 1965 – 26 November 2020) was an Egyptian politician, human rights activist, and Chairman of the Egyptian Organization for Human rights, Egypt's oldest human rights NGO, most known for his campaigns against torture and police brutality in Egypt. Abu Seada was also member of the National Council for Human Rights, Egypt's national human rights institution.

== Biography ==
Abu Seada was born in 1965 in Cairo, Egypt. He took part in the student movement of the 1980s against president Mubarak's government and was detained several times due to his dissident activities. After graduating from law school he worked as a human rights lawyer and got involved in Egyptian civil society. Throughout his human rights career he held many posts including the presidency of the Egyptian Organization for human Rights. He was also appointed in the mid 2000s in the government formed Egyptian National or Human Rights, and was a member of International Federation for Human Rights and was its envoy to the Arab league from 2004 to 2007. Abu Seada took part in dozens of international human rights conferences, as well as attending the United Nations Human Rights council sessions in Geneva regularly representing the Egyptian Organization for Human Rights which has a consultative status with the UN that gives it the right to observe various UN sessions. Abu Seada was a vocal supporter of Egypt's 2011 Revolution against the Mubarak regime, and took part in the street protests that ousted Egypt's longtime dictator, Abu Seada also harshly opposed the Muslim Brotherhood's regime and took part in the June 2013 uprising that ultimately led to the deposing of president Morsi on July 3, 2013. Abu Seada ran in Egypt's 2015 parliamentary elections, he nominated himself in the Maadi electoral district as a candidate of the conservative party. He pledged that the preservation of human rights and freedom of expression will be on the top of his legislative agenda if elected. Abu Seada's strongest opponents in the elections were Hussein Megawer a leading figure of Mubarak's defunct National Democratic Party and a former member of parliament, and Gamal El Sherif a well known lawyer. Abu Seada came in third in the polls, losing in the first round, while El Sherif defeated Megawer in the runoffs by a landslide. Abu Seada attained a PhD in international law from Alexandria University in 2017, and remained one of the vocal defenders of human rights in Egypt despite a massive government crackdown on civil society.

In September 2017, Independent United Watch (IUNW), a lobbying organization, expressed its profound shock of the actions of some NGOs which became the vehicle for certain governments to attack other countries and senior International human rights NGOs. In this regard, the lobbying organization accused Abu Seada of being a tool of successive repressive Egyptian regimes. The organization said Abu Seada had always sided with the military regimes and turned blind eye to many serious human rights violations. Abu Seada used his position, the Secretary-General of the Egyptian Organization for Human Rights, to cover up Egypt's military human rights violations. Furthermore, internal Intelligence US reports said Abu Seada received large funds from UAE between August 2015 to July 2017 to support UAE's foreign and regional policies.

Abu Seada died on 26 November 2020, from a COVID-19 infection. He was 55 years old.
