= Institute of Human Rights in Catalonia =

Non-governmental organisation in Spain

The Institute of Human Rights of Catalonia, or Institut de Drets Humans de Catalunya (IDHC) is a non-governmental organization that promotes human rights in the region of Catalonia, Spain. It was established with the goal of expanding political, social, and cultural rights. The organization's activities focus on research, education, and advocacy.

== Background ==
IDHC emerged in 1984 out of the structure established by the Office of the High Commissioner for Human Rights in Catalonia, which included the Catalan Ombudsman. Founded in Barcelona in 2000, it is the only generalist independent entity advancing human rights in the region that has an observer status at the United Nations. This means that the organization can participate in international human rights discussions and also contribute to the implementation of international human rights engagements through advocacy. In 2017, IDHC became a component of the Catalan Human Rights Structure created by the Catalonian government.

== Advocacies and collaborations ==
IDHC hosts dialogues and discussions involving experts and practitioners that contribute in policymaking that leads to effective practices that uphold human dignity and the achievement of minimum standards in the areas of economic, social, and cultural rights.

As a UN observer, the IDHC also engages with international human rights organization and agencies that seek to strengthen the world's human rights standards. It is an active participant within the United Nations system advancing human rights principles, including dialogues that address critical human rights topics. The organization also participates in monitoring compliance to international human rights standards. For instance, it monitors compliance with the Council of Europe’s first international treaty on Artificial Intelligence.

== Research ==
IDHC is involved in the study and critical examinations of human rights violations, legal frameworks, and public policies. It also partners with academic and research institutions, governmental agencies, and other NGOs that are aligned with its objectives. Its research activities cover legal, social, and political areas, and its research outputs are published and distributed in academic publications, policy briefs, and seminars.

IDHC's research initiatives fall within the organization's lines of work, which are promotion, consultation, and teaching of human rights. In the area of promotion, IDHC carries out studies that spread the culture of human rights such as forgotten conflicts, rights in the city, and emerging rights, among others. Research related to consultation focuses on providing technical and scientific support to public institutions such as the case of the organization's work for the European Charter for the Safeguarding of Human Rights in the city.

To promote human rights, IDHC conducts workshops, seminars, and virtual courses that raise awareness on critical human rights issues in the Catalonia region. An example is its partnership with Escola de Cultura de Pau, which provides virtual trainings that address gender-based conflicts as well as the mechanisms of conflict resolution.
