= Mohamed Soltan =

Political activist from Egypt (born 1987)

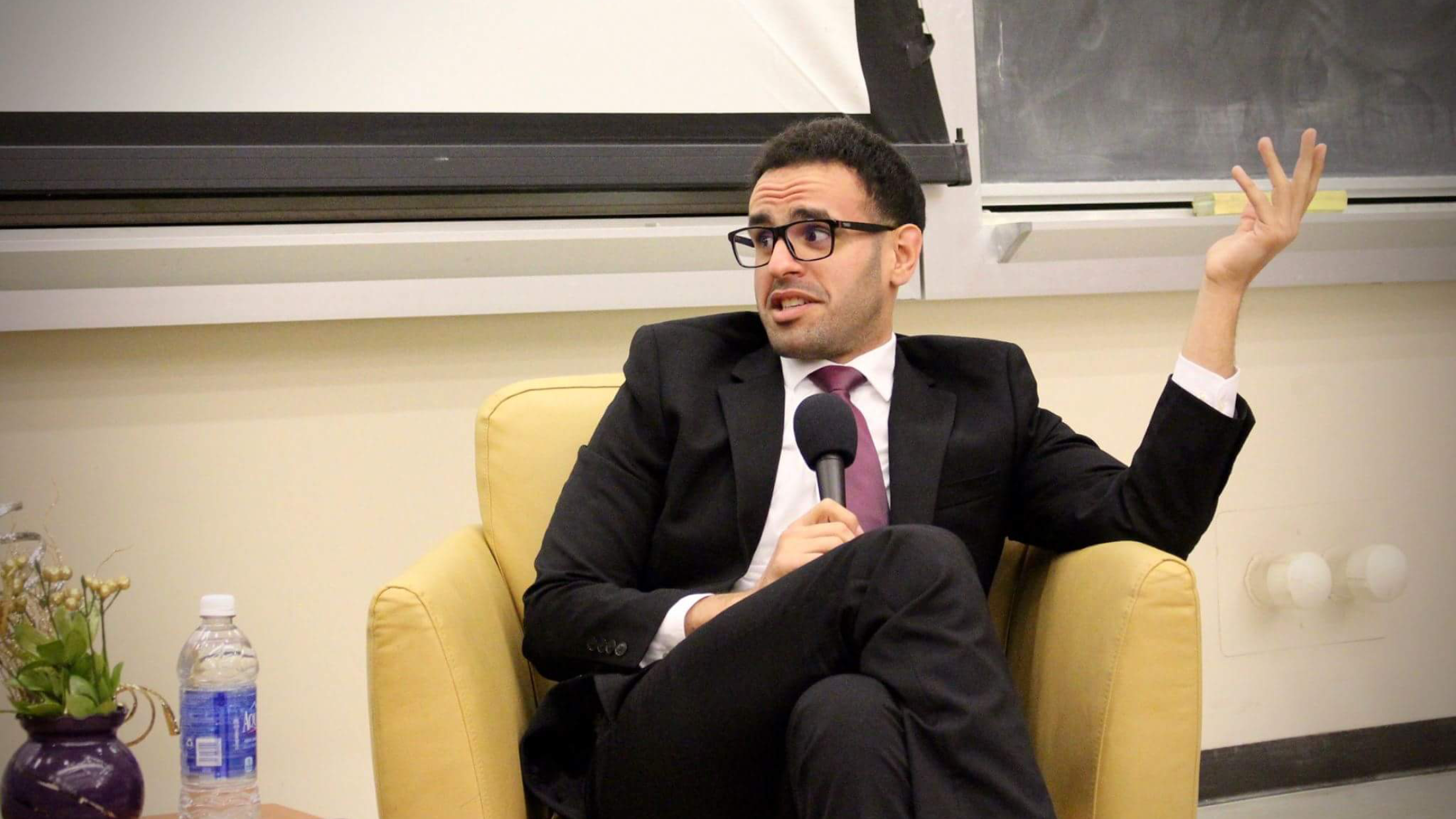
- Born: Mohamed Soltan; 16 November 1987 (age 38)
- Education: Master of Science in Foreign Service, Bachelor of Science in Economics
- Alma mater: Georgetown University, Ohio State University
- Known for: human rights, activism, politics, Egypt
- Parent: Salah Sultan
- Website: https://mohamedsoltan.com, https://twitter.com/soltan, https://www.facebook.com/Soltanlife/

Mohamed Soltan (Arabic: محمد سلطان, born 16 November 1987) is an Egyptian American human rights advocate and former political prisoner in Egypt.

He co-founded and leads the Freedom Initiative, a U.S.-based human rights organization whose mission is "to bring international attention to the plight of political prisoners in the Middle East and advocate for their release."

The Freedom Initiative emerged from the global #FreeSoltan activist movement that campaigned for Soltan's release from unjust imprisonment in Egypt, where he was detained from August 2013 to May 2015 after protesting against the 2013 Egyptian coup d'état by Abdel Fattah el-Sisi. During and just after the coup, Soltan was shot, imprisoned, tortured, and sentenced to life in prison.

After 643 days imprisoned, including 489 on hunger strike demanding his release, Soltan was freed to go to the United States. His release came after appeals for his freedom from the Obama White House, Senator John McCain and other U.S. leaders.

== Early life, family, and education ==
Soltan was born in Egypt. One of five siblings, he and his family moved to the U.S. in the mid-1990s when he was seven years old. They lived in Boston, Kansas City and Detroit before settling in Columbus, Ohio.

Soltan played junior varsity and varsity basketball in high school, weighing 336 pounds (152 kilos) when he began his junior year of high school. Ten years later, while imprisoned in Egypt and on hunger strike demanding his freedom, he wrote fondly of his high school basketball years in a letter smuggled out of prison and published in the New York Times: "I stopped smoking sheesha, lost 60 pounds, worked extra hard every practice, and moved from benching the J.V. team to 6th-man, to a starter. By the end of the year, I was on the varsity basketball team with my classmates."

In January 2012, he escaped an arson attack on his family home – an incident the FBI investigated as an anti-Muslim hate crime. Months before, vandals painted anti-Arab and anti-Muslim slurs on his family home.

Soltan attended The Ohio State University, graduating in 2012 with a Bachelor's degree in Economics.

Soltan's father, Salah Soltan, is a prominent scholar of Islamic jurisprudence who taught at many Islamic education institutions and authored more than 60 books. Salah Soltan was affiliated with the Muslim Brotherhood and served as a deputy minister of endowments in the government of Egyptian President Mohamed Morsi. After the 2013 coup in Egypt that overthrew the Morsi government, Salah was imprisoned and sentenced to death. In 2019, the United Nations Working Group on Arbitrary Detention described Salah as a "prisoner of conscience" and called for his "immediate release" from imprisonment. In February 2022, 19 human rights organizations called on the Egyptian authorities to urgently provide health care to Salah as he was in "critical health" condition and "was unable to support his own weight and was carried into the room by two guards." The rights organizations said that the prison officials had refused his multiple requests to see a doctor or to provide the medication and medical equipment he needs for his multiple health conditions.

When Mohamed Soltan married Habiba Shebita in Reston, Virginia in September 2017, Mohamed's father addressed the wedding party via audio message smuggled out of prison, saying: "I am with you. Look amongst you and you will see me in your faces and eyes. I am with you as you are with me."

== Arab Spring ==
Soltan took a break from his school when the 2011 revolution broke out and went to Egypt to join the youth-driven revolution for freedom. He and his friends at Ohio State University created shirts for the youth coalition to wear at the entrances to Cairo's Tahrir Square. Soltan joined the sit-in in Tahrir Square and was on the frontline at the presidential palace in Egypt when President Hosni Mubarak was forced to step down. Weeks after, Soltan returned to the U.S. and toured university campuses to speak about his experience during the revolution.

== Return to Egypt ==
After graduating from Ohio State University in 2012, Soltan moved back to Egypt to aid his ill mother who was receiving treatment for cancer. He worked as a business development manager for an Egyptian petroleum service company. During that time, his father served as the Deputy Minister of Islamic Endowment in the 2012 Morsi administration.

== Rabaa Square ==
Soltan was swept up in the Egyptian army's crackdown on pro-Morsi demonstrators protesting the 3 July 2013 military coup. In protest of the return of military rule, Soltan joined the Rab’aa Al-Adawiya sit-ins, where he served as a de facto citizen-journalist and often coordinated with foreign journalists and protestors. As a result, he became a firsthand witness to the violent dispersal of the sit-in, where he sustained a gunshot wound in the arm by snipers while live-tweeting what later came to be known as the bloodiest massacre in Egypt's recent history.

== Arrest and imprisonment ==
In August 2013, while recovering from his wounds at his family home in Cairo, Soltan was arrested, along with three journalists. He disappeared for two days and was blindfolded, beaten, and interrogated by state security officers about his father's whereabouts. During the first months of his imprisonment, Soltan said he was tortured, beaten on his broken arm and was denied medical attention.

In September 2013, The New York Times published a letter from Soltan to his mother – a letter smuggled out of prison. Soltan wrote of what he described as his harsh, "mind-boggling" prison conditions. He also said "I was then told I would be formally charged with six crimes: funding a terrorist organization; membership in a terrorist organization; membership in an armed militia; disturbing the peace; falsifying and spreading rumors about the internal affairs of Egypt; and finally, the killing of protesters. I was completely shocked that such charges, none of which had any basis in reality, would be so casually brought against me, and thought of the future plans I had for my career, and family, and thought that they would all be so casually ruined by this sham I was being subjected to."

In a January 2014 Soltan letter smuggled out of prison and addressed to President Barack Obama, a despondent and angry Soltan wrote in part, "Your abandonment of me, an American citizen who worked tirelessly towards your election, and a staunch supporter and defender of your presidency, has left a sting in me that is almost as intense as the sharp pain emanating from my recently sliced arm." The letter was published in The New York Times.

== Hunger strike ==
Months into his imprisonment, Soltan began an open-ended hunger strike that lasted 489 days, protesting his unjust imprisonment and the inhumane detention conditions. On 30 May 2015, shortly after an Egyptian judge sentenced him to life in prison along with 37 others, including 13 journalists, the United States government spoke out against the sentencing and the White House condemned Soltan's sentencing and demanded his immediate release. According to a Guardian report citing an independent medical report facilitated by the U.S. embassy in Cairo, Soltan had lost at least a third of his body weight and was unable to stand unassisted on his 100th day of hunger strike in prison.

On 27 May 2014, a video showing Soltan was released by CNN's Christiane Amanpour in which Soltan asked President Obama and the international community for help.

== #FreeSoltan campaign ==
Soltan's hunger strike was supported by a worldwide #FreeSoltan campaign effort, both locally in Egypt and internationally in the U.S. and Europe. The campaign was managed by Soltan's older sister, Hanaa, and consisted of family, friends, lawyers and human rights defenders around the world. The campaign focused on managing messaging, channeling it effectively in legal and governmental circles. The campaign succeeding in rallying thousands of people from all walks of life behind Soltan's plight.

The #FreeSoltan campaign accused the U.S. government of not doing enough to push Egyptian authorities to resolve or drop his case, which they say is politically motivated. Supporters of Soltan have also called the charges against him to be politically motivated. The hunger strike by Soltan sparked criticism of the Egyptian authorities on social media and led to mass petitions and demonstrations to highlight his imprisonment. A U.S. embassy official said embassy representatives visited Soltan several times at the Tora Prison outside Cairo and were present at Soltan's hearings.

== Advocacy ==
Following his release from prison in May 2015, Soltan briefed senior U.S. government officials on his time in prison and the plight of the tens of thousands of political prisoners in Egypt. He testified before the U.S. Congress's Lantos Commission on Human Rights. Soltan also briefed human rights organizations and other advocacy groups to discuss the gross human rights violations he faced in prison and that many continue to face.

Soltan and his sister, Hanaa, leveraged the successes and lessons learned from the #FreeSoltan campaign to launch The Freedom Initiative, a U.S.-based human rights organization that works to secure the release of political prisoners in Egypt and Saudi Arabia. The group undertakes advocacy, campaigns and legal actions in an effort to achieve its goals.

== Jamal Khashoggi friendship ==
Soltan was a friend and ally of Saudi journalist and Washington Post columnist Jamal Khashoggi, who was assassinated by Saudi government agents in the Saudi consulate in Istanbul, Turkey on 2 October 2018. In a September 2019 op-ed in The Washington Post, Soltan described their friendship and how Khashoggi served as a mentor to him and other Arab human rights activists. Soltan later branded the outcome of the widely-criticized secret Saudi Khashoggi murder trial as an "abhorrent miscarriage of justice." Soltan elaborated on their friendship in subsequent media interviews and in a documentary film on Khashoggi, "Kingdom of Silence." When the Washington OXI Day Foundation presented its 2019 Courage Award to Khashoggi posthumously, Soltan accepted the award on Khashoggi's behalf.

== Lawsuit against former Egyptian prime minister ==
In June 2020, Soltan filed a lawsuit against a former prime minister of Egypt, Hazem el-Beblawi, under the Torture Victims Protection Act. The lawsuit argued el-Bablawi, who served as prime minister when Soltan was detained, should be held accountable for Soltan being unjustly shot, imprisoned and tortured.

Weeks after Soltan filed his lawsuit, and again in February 2021, Egyptian authorities arrested several of Soltan's family members. Soltan's attorney claimed the arrests were retaliation for Soltan's lawsuit, with the intention of silencing Soltan and convincing him to withdraw his lawsuit.

In April 2021, the Biden administration's Justice Department declared el-Beblawi was protected from prosecution by diplomatic immunity. In its legal filing, the Justice Department said it did not take a position on the merits of Soltan's allegations. U.S. Senate Appropriations Committee Chairman Patrick Leahy declared the U.S. government's immunity declaration "disappointing," adding "The Egyptian government could have waived immunity but instead chose impunity for Mr. Beblawi." Leahy concluded, "This is what one would expect from a criminal enterprise, not a government that receives billions of dollars of U.S. aid."

== Egypt spy chief demand that Soltan be imprisoned in U.S. ==
During a June 2021 visit to Washington, D.C., Egypt's spy chief, Abbas Kamel, asked U.S. officials and lawmakers why the U.S. government was not honoring an alleged U.S. agreement with Egypt for Soltan to serve the remainder of his Egypt-rendered life-long prison sentence in the United States. Kamel shared with U.S. officials a document alleged to show a U.S. diplomat in Egypt agreed in writing that Soltan, upon his departure from Egypt, would serve the rest of his life sentence in a U.S. prison. Another former U.S. diplomat once based in Cairo described the alleged document as "legally unenforceable even if authentic."

Soltan dismissed Kamel's claims as a "natural progression of the well-documented intimidation and bullying campaign by the Egyptian regime against me and human rights defenders." Soltan added, "I hope my government responds swiftly and decisively to protect my basic rights and freedoms from their aggression."

In response to Kamel's futile effort to ensure Soltan was imprisoned in the U.S. and other Egyptian government attempts to intimidate its human rights' critics abroad, 20 human rights organizations issued a joint statement saying in part "We are appalled by evidence that the Egyptian government and intelligence apparatus persist in efforts to silence human rights defenders even beyond Egypt's borders. We call on the U.S. government to condemn these actions." The statement's signatories included Amnesty International USA, Human Rights Watch, The Freedom Initiative, POMED and DAWN.

In a lengthy commentary, Amnesty International's secretary-general, Agnes Callamard, reacted angrily to Kamel's push for the U.S. to imprison Soltan, saying "Standing up to this transnational bullying is not only standing up for rights defenders; it is standing up for the very right to speak and act freely."
