= Mustapha Mahmoud Park Massacre =

The Mustapha Mahmoud Park Massacre denotes a 2005 incident in Cairo, in which dozens of Sudanese asylum seekers were killed. The civil wars in Sudan that have been taking place on and off since 1955, the subsequent destabilization and economic collapse caused by the country's infrastructure and economy, and the fighting in Darfur (2003), forced millions of Sudanese civilians to flee their homes and cities. Many of them arrived in Egypt, the neighboring country.

In October 2005, about 2,000 Sudanese people camped outside Mustafa Mahmoud square, Mohandessin – an upper middle class suburb where the UN High Commissioner for Refugees (UNHCR) has an office – protesting conditions in Egypt and seeking to be resettled in another country. After three months, Egyptian security forces who came to evacuate the camp, opened fire on the crowd, killing dozens of people and detaining hundreds. The result, according to the Egyptian government official statement: 25 Sudanese people killed and 169 wounded. Unofficially, however, 134 were killed and over 400 wounded.
