= Mustafa Kassem =

Mustafa Kassem (1964 – 14 January 2020) was an American citizen who died in an Egyptian prison while conducting a hunger strike against what he called his "unlawful arrest" and "imprisonment."

== Life ==
Kassem was born in Egypt and emigrated to the United States, leaving his immediate family of a wife and two children behind. He became a naturalized American citizen and was working as an auto parts dealer and a cab driver in New York.

In August 2013, Kassem went to Egypt to visit his family. The night before Kassem was to return to the U.S., he went out to exchange money and shop when security officials detained him and his brother-in-law, accusing them of participating in the protests against the revolution that were taking place in the country. (Note: Human rights groups subsequently stated that as many as 800 people were killed in the crackdown by Egyptian government forces. (Time, 2020))

After being held, along with others who were arrested during the crackdown, for five years without any charges having been filed by the prosecuting authorities against him or the others, Kassem appeared as a co-defendant in a mass trial of some 700 people and was sentenced to 15 years imprisonment for participating in unlawful acts of protest.

In 2018, Kassemm, who was a diabetic, began a series of hunger strikes and appealed to the American president Donald Trump and vice president Mike Pence to intervene to the Egyptian government on his behalf, because, he stated in an open letter to the U.S. administration, "I'm losing my will and don't know how else to get your attention." Kassem's lawyer stated that they did not hear back from the White House or Pence's office. The State Department stated the U.S. is "deeply concerned about [Kassem's] conviction and his sentencing" and that the issue had "been raised repeatedly with the Egyptian Government," adding that officials from the U.S. embassy in Cairo have conducted consular visits with Kassem to check on his condition.

On 9 January, Kassem, having renewed his hunger strike by refusing to eat solids, ceased taking liquids as well. According to a statement by the Egyptian interior ministry, Kassem was "shortly thereafter" moved to the prison's medical wing for "treatment for his diabetes."

On the night between 13 and 14 January 2020, Kassem died from a heart attack induced by the hunger strike and his diabetic condition.

On the 19th, U.S. secretary of state Mike Pompeo, while U.S. secretary of state attending in Berlin, Germany, a multi-nation conference on the Libyan crisis, stated that he expressed his "outrage" to the Egyptian president Abdel Fattah el-Sisi. He tweeted that, in his meeting with President Sisi, he "addressed the pointless and tragic death" of Kassem.

== Legacy ==
In 2021, A mural in Astoria, Queens was dedicated to Mustafa Kassem on the side wall of 8-01 Astoria Boulevard. The mural depicts his face and name, with his date of birth and date of death painted underneath his head and a banner reading "One struggle, many faces" above his head.
