= Morten Kjærum =

Danish lawyer (born 1957)

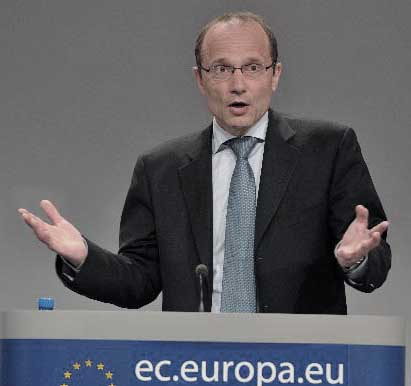
Morten Kjærum, director of the Raoul Wallenberg Institute

Morten Kjærum (born 30 March 1957) is a Danish lawyer, who is the new head of the Raoul Wallenberg Institute of Human Rights and Humanitarian Law in Sweden. From 2008 to 2015 he directed the European Union Agency for Fundamental Rights (FRA), based in Vienna, Austria. He is also a former director of the Danish Institute for Human Rights and of the EU Agency for Fundamental Rights.

== Life ==
Kjærum obtained his degree in law from Aarhus University in 1984. He began his legal work at NGO Danish Refugee Council. He was the Head of the Danish Refugee Asylum Department from 1984 to 1991, and in 1991 he became director of the Danish "Centre for Human Rights". When the Centre closed in 2002, Kjærum became director of the newly established Institute for Human Rights at the Danish Centre for International Studies and Human Rights, where he worked until May 2008.

In March 2008 he was appointed director of the Vienna-based EU Agency for Fundamental Rights (FRA), taking up the post in June that year. In May 2013, the FRA Management Board extended his contract as Director of the Agency for another 3 years, with effect from 1 June 2013. At the end of March 2015, Kjærum left the FRA to become head of the Raoul Wallenberg Institute in Lund, Sweden.

In 2002 he became a member of the UN Committee on the Elimination of Racial Discrimination (CERD) and in 2004 Chairman of the International Coordinating Committee of National Human Rights Institutions (ICC).

In August 2008, Kjærum received a prize from the Danish National Association for Gays and Lesbians for promoting the rights of gays and lesbians. He then in 2013 received an honorary professorship at the University of Aalborg in his home country Denmark.
