= Egyptian Organization for Human Rights =

Non-governmental organization

Egyptian Organization for Human Rights المنظمة المصرية لحقوق الإنسان
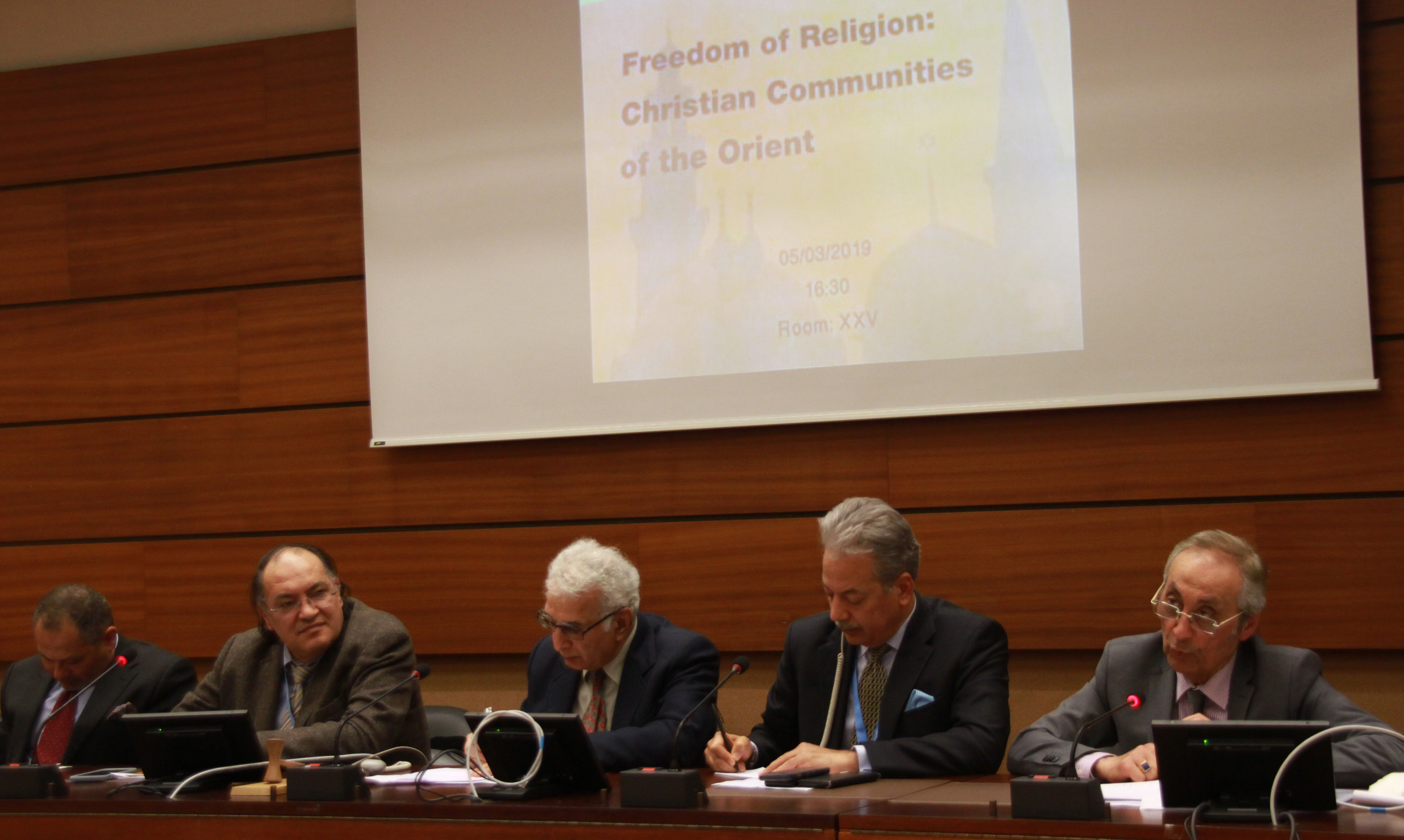
- EOHR side event at UN Geneva
- Founded: 1985
- Founder: Saad Eddin Ibrahim; Hani Shukrallah Bahey Hassan Negad el-Borai Hafez Abu Seada Diaa Rashwan
- Type: Non-profit
- Location: Cairo (Egypt)
- Region served: Egypt
- Key people: Essam Shiha (President of the Board of Trustees)
- Website: Official website

The Egyptian Organization for Human Rights (EOHR; Arabic: المنظمة المصرية لحقوق الإنسان, romanized: al-Munaẓẓamah al-Miṣrīyah li-Ḥuqūq al-Insān), founded in April 1985 and with its headquarters in Cairo, Egypt, is a non-profit NGO and one of the longest-standing bodies for the defense of human rights in Egypt. It investigates, monitors, and reports on human rights violations and defends people's rights regardless of the identity, gender or color of the victim. EOHR faces any human rights violations made either by governmental or non-governmental parties. It is registered with the United Nations and works with other human rights groups.

== Overview ==
The Egyptian Organization for Human Rights (EOHR) was founded in 1985 by Saad Eddin Ibrahim and Hani Shukrallah. It was the first human rights organization in the country and remains one of the most professional non-governmental organizations (NGOs) in Egypt. Its headquarters is in Cairo, and has regional branches with a national membership of approximately 2,300 active volunteers in 17 provincial branches located across the country. EOHR is a non-profit NGO working within the framework of the principles established in the Universal Declaration of Human Rights and other international human rights instruments regardless of the identity or affiliation of the victim or violator .

EOHR acts and reports on both governmental and non-governmental human rights violations. According to its reports issues annually the decade of the late 1980s through to the late 1990s was marked by an increase in torture in Egypt. During this period the organization's activists were regularly harassed and arrested making their work increasingly difficult. Despite these challenges the organization maintained a steady accounting of state and non-state violations of human rights and started a series of publications of human rights books to raise awareness of human rights issues in the country. An attempt by the EOHR deputy director, Karim Alrawi, to start a theater company to tour villages with plays on human rights themes was scrapped after he was arrested and interrogated by state security forces. During the last decade of the Mubarak dictatorship the EOHR was represented, while maintaining its independence, on the state sponsored Supreme Council of Human Rights.

== EOHR's international status ==
EOHR is part of the wider international and Arab human rights movement. It cooperates with the United Nations human rights bodies, as well as with other international and regional human rights organizations. EOHR was registered at the Ministry of Social Affairs in 2003 under registration No. 5220/2003.

EOHR was granted special consultative status with the United Nations Economic and Social Council in 2006. This consultative status enables EOHR to enjoy closer interaction with the United Nations by participating in the activities of the International Council for Human Rights, according to ECOSOC decision 31/1996. This decision aimed to reinforce the principles of the human rights stipulated in the Universal Declaration of Human Rights, the Vienna Declaration and all other international human rights documents. EOHR is also a member of five international organizations: the Arab Organization for Human Rights (AOHR), the World Organisation Against Torture (OMCT), International Federation for Human Rights (IFHR), the International Commission of Jurists (ICJ), and the International Freedom of Expression Exchange (IFEX).

== Achievements ==
- EOHR conducted a campaign to cancel Flogging in prisons in 1990 and the Egyptian government responded by submitting a draft law to cancel flogging in the year 2000.
- Since EOHR was established in 1985, it has been working on facing torturing prisoners and arrested people in the police stations and detention centers; so it always issues reports on the tortured cases. It has submitted three reports on torture to the UN's World Organization against Torture. The last report was submitted in 2002.
- EOHR conducted a campaign to confront torture in Egypt in 2003. The report indicated that torture in Egypt is based on specific studied methodology. So EOHR held a number of discussion workshops and prepared a draft law amending some articles in the criminal law, related to torture.
- EOHR, in cooperation with The International Federation for Human Rights (FIDH), has launched a campaign for cancelling Death Penalty.
- EOHR launched a campaign for confronting corruption and a fact finding committee to document the facts of the 25th of January Revolution.
- EOHR launched a campaign to cancel the emergency law and the emergency status.
- EOHR launched a campaign to cancel imprisonment sentences for publishing charges.
- EOHR listed the forcible detainees in Egypt starting 1990 and submitted the list to the Forcible Detention Committee of the United Nations.
- EOHR provides legal assistance to the needy woman at the headquarters or on phone since 1994.
- EOHR spreads the human rights culture among the university students and the fresh graduate lawyers throughout training workshops.

The EOHR also worked much on the political and constitutional reform issues:

1. "Reform Priorities and Mechanisms in the Arab World" conference that aimed at the reactivation of the reform process in the Arab World.
2. EOHR 9th Intellectual Forum was held in February 2005 under the name of "the Constitutional Reform between Speeding up and Delay", and produced the Egyptian Constitutional Group", that includes members from the civil society NGO's, political parties, parliamentary members and constitutional law professors. The group aims at the amendment of the 1971 constitution to comply with the current Egyptian affairs.
3. EOHR 10th Intellectual Forum was held in October 2006 under the name of "Reform of the Egyptian Electoral System". The forum discussed the advantages and disadvantages of many electoral systems in different countries.
4. EOHR 11th Intellectual Forum was held in November 2011 under the name of "Towards a New Egyptian Constitution". The forum discussed the reasons that necessitate amending the 1971 constitution.

== Publications ==
Since 1985, EOHR has issued many kinds of publications on the human rights:

- Annual report on the human rights' situation in Egypt: the report provides general indicators on the human rights situation in Egypt in a complete year. EOHR has begun issuing this report on 1989.
- "Defending Human Rights" report: EOHR has begun issuing "Defending Human Rights" report since 1990, documenting issues related to the human right' violations. It includes all the press releases and intellectual meetings' reports in two years.
- Human Rights' Magazine: it is a magazine which covers different aspects of human rights.

== Bibliography ==
- Beinin, Joel (2011), Social Movements, Mobilization, and Contestation in the Middle East and North Africa, Stanford University Press, ISBN 9780804777780
- The Egyptian Organization for Human Rights: 'Information Booklet', Manyal el Roda Cairo, Egypt
