= Islamic Association in Sweden =

Islamic organization in Sweden

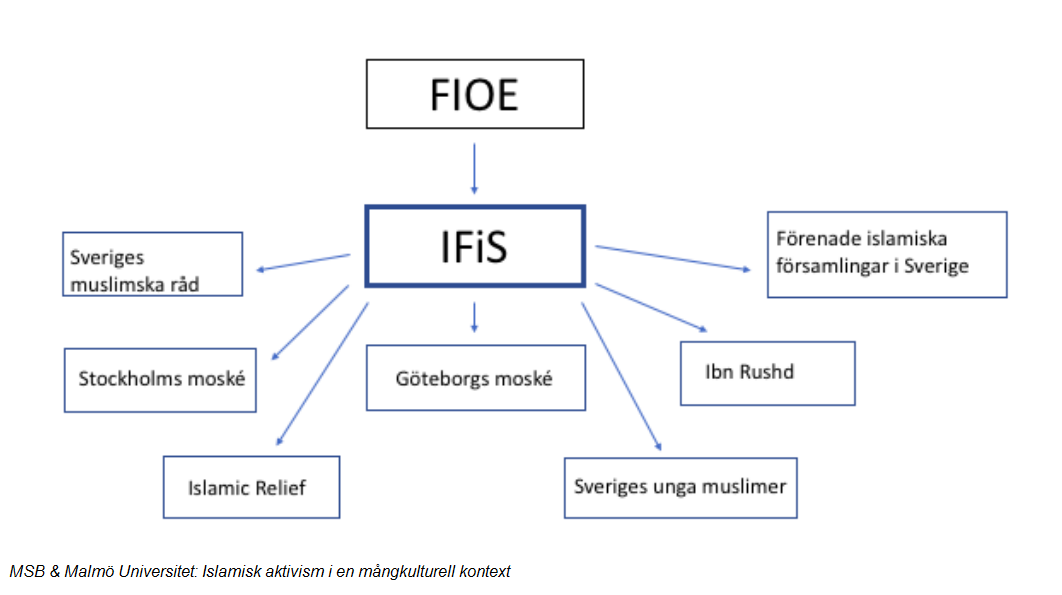
Islamic organizations in the FIOE-IFiS network in Sweden

The Islamic Association in Sweden (Arabic: الرابطة الأسلامية في السويد; Swedish: Islamiska förbundet i Sverige, IFiS) was formed according to the records of the Swedish Tax Agency, the protocol of the constituent meeting of The Islamic Association in Sweden (IFiS) on January 27–28, 1995 in the presence of Ahmed Ghanem, Mostafa Kharraki, Mahmoud Aldebe, Zoheir Berrahmoune, Mahmoud Kalim and Sami al-Sarif. The initiator is the Stockholm organisation Islamiska Förbundet i Stockholm, which runs Stockholm mosque and was found 1987. IFiS headquarters are located at Stockholm Mosque. According to the IFiS charter, it is a founding member in the Muslim Brotherhood-associated umbrella organisation Federation of Islamic Organisations in Europe whose guidelines it follows. It has started the following organisations, either alone or together with others:

- Islamic Relief in Sweden
- Muslim Youth of Sweden
- Islamiska informationsföreningen (IIF) (tr: Islamic information society)
- Union of Muslim Students in Sweden (Al Khawarizmy),
- Imam's Association
- Sweden's Islamic Schools (SIS)
- Muslim Woman Association
- Sweden's Muslim Scouts
- New Moon Cultural Association
- Quran Reader Society
- Ibn Rushd Study Association
- Muslim Council of Sweden (SMR)

Omar Mustafa is chairman of IFiS since 2011. On 7 April 2013 he was elected to the party committee of the Swedish Social Democratic Party, which was noted by anti-racist magazine Expo as Mustafa, as chairman of IFiS, had invited Salah Sultan and Ragheb Al-Serjany both of whom had spread antisemitic views in al Jazeera interviews and that he also "likes" Egyptian imam Yousef Al-Qaradawi on Facebook. During the Easter of 2013, IFiS invited Yvonne Ridley and Azzam Tamimi to a seminar to a conference it organised together with Ibn Rushd and Sveriges Unga Muslimer. As a result of the discoveries, Mustafa left the Social Democratic Party committee and party.

== IFiS organization chart ==
IFiS is an umbrella organization.

Federation of Islamic; Organizations in Europe (FIOE)
IFiS
Muslim Council of Sweden	Stockholm mosque	Gothenburg Mosque	Islamic Relief	Sveriges Unga Muslimer	Ibn Rushd

== See also ==
- Islam in Sweden
