= Islam in Sweden =

Islam in Europe by percentage of country population 95–100%: Azerbaijan; 90–95%: Turkey; Kosovo; 50–70%: Albania; Bosnia and Herzegovina; Kazakhstan; 30–35%: North Macedonia; 10–20%: France; Sweden; Georgia; Montenegro; 5–10%: Austria; Belgium; Bulgaria; Denmark; Germany; Liechtenstein; Luxembourg; Netherlands; Russia; Switzerland; United Kingdom; Spain; Greece; 4–5%: Serbia; 2–4%: Italy; Finland; Norway; Malta; Slovenia; Cyprus (Note: Only takes into account the Muslim population residing on land controlled by the Republic of Cyprus.); 1–2%: Croatia; Ireland; Ukraine; Andorra; < 1%: Iceland; Armenia; Belarus; Czech Republic; Estonia; Hungary; Latvia; Lithuania; Moldova; Monaco; Poland; Portugal; Romania; San Marino; Slovakia

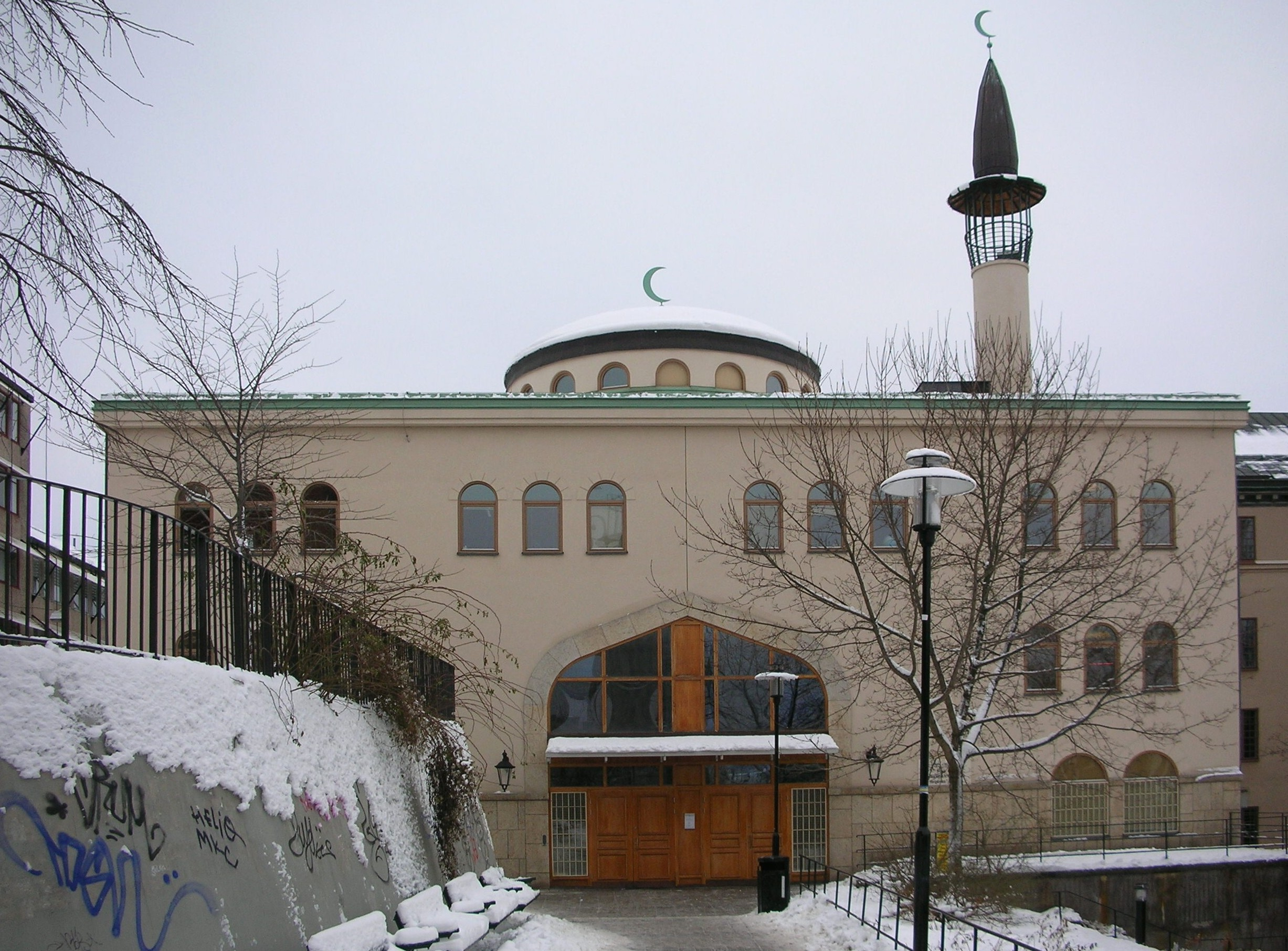
Stockholm Mosque

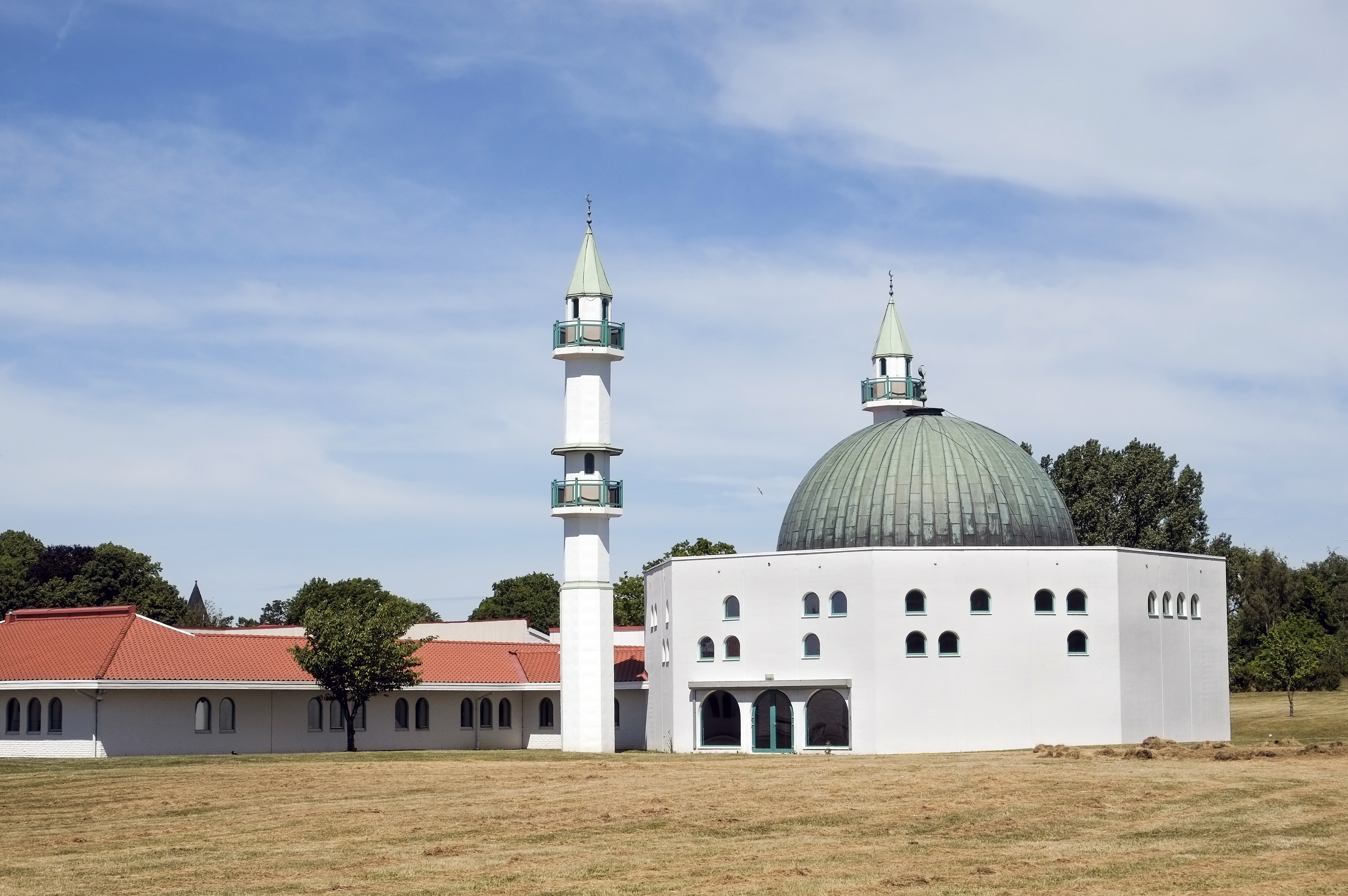
The Malmö Mosque. Approximately one-third of Malmö's inhabitants are Muslims.

Swedish contact with the Muslim world dates back to the 7th–10th centuries, when the Vikings traded with Muslims during the Islamic Golden Age. Since the late 1960s, Muslim immigration from the Middle East, Balkans and Horn of Africa has impacted the demographics of religion in Sweden, and has been the main driver of the spread of Islam in the country. Islam in Sweden increased the most as a result of high refugee influxes, notably during the Yugoslav Wars and the Somali Civil War in the 1990s; the Iraq War in the 2000s; and the Syrian civil war in the 2010s.

The Muslim community in Sweden hails from numerous countries, making it a complex and heterogeneous population. According to a 2019 report from the Swedish Agency for Support to Faith Communities, there were 200,445 Muslims in Sweden who practiced their religion regularly; this count came from those registered with Islamic congregations. The US Department of State's Sweden 2014 International Religious Freedom Report set the 2014 figure of Muslims in Sweden at around 600,000 people, 6% of the total Swedish population. The Pew Research Center reported that around 8% of the population—approximately 800,000 people—had a Muslim background in Sweden as of 2016.

== History ==
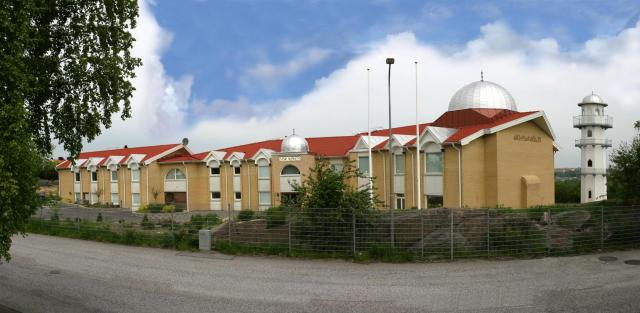
Nasir Mosque, the first mosque in Sweden, was built in Gothenburg in the 1970s by the Ahmadiyya Movement.

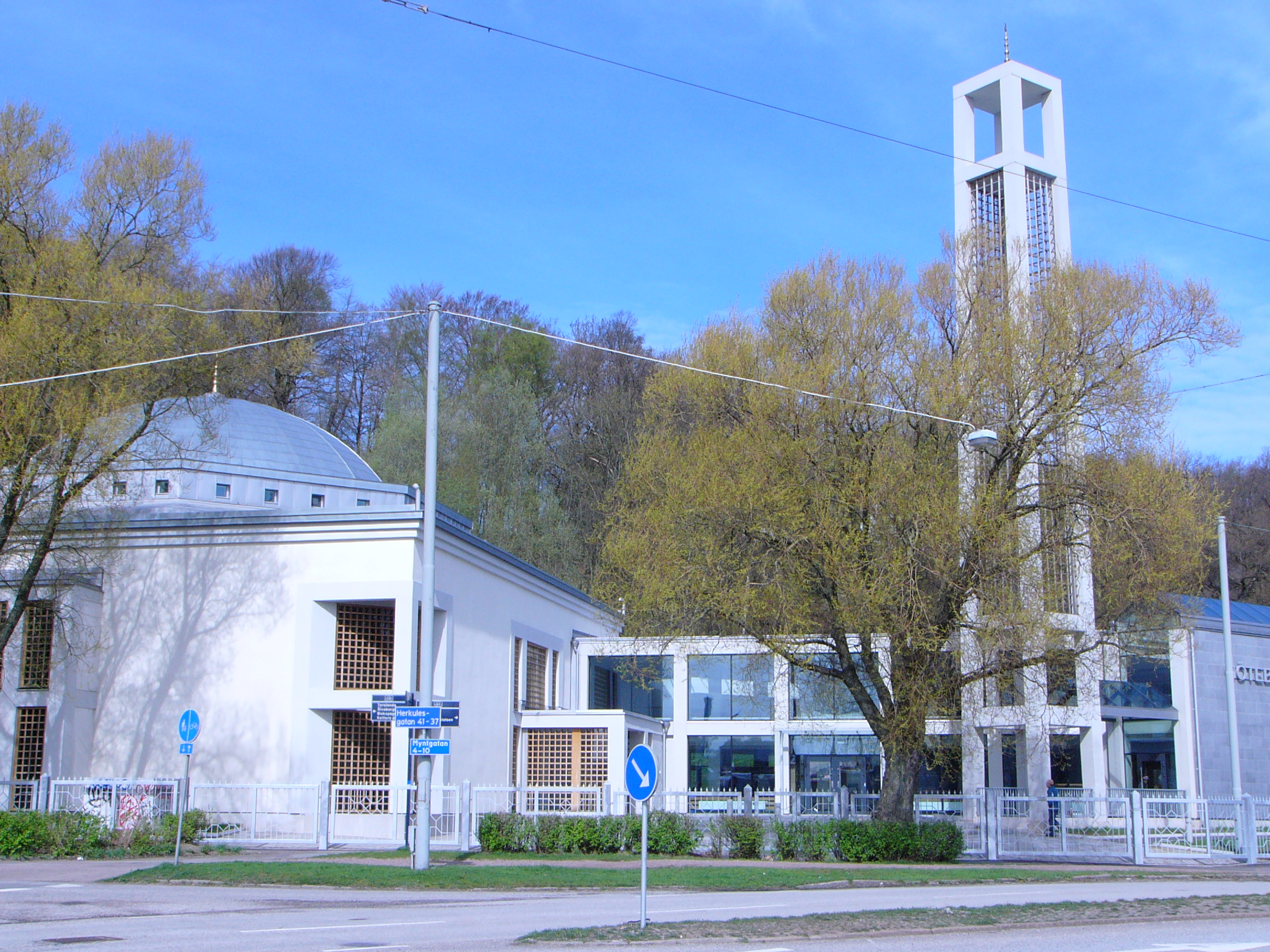
Gothenburg Mosque

Pre-Islamic Arabic coins originating from the Middle East have been found at Iron Age burial sites. Archaeological findings have also shown Viking contact with Islam dating back to the 7th–10th centuries, when the Vikings seem to have been trading with the medieval Islamic world, among others.

The Swedish census in 1930 listed 15 people as belonging to the group "Muslims and other Asian faiths". Although the number of Muslims themselves are not known, one estimate suggests a maximum of 11 but could have been as low as 2.

In modern Sweden, the first registered Muslim groups were Finnish Tatars who emigrated from Finland and Estonia in the 1940s. Islam began to have a noticeable presence in Sweden with immigration from the Middle East and Turkey beginning in the 1970s. Further waves of immigrants came to Sweden from the former Yugoslav republics, and more recently from Somalia and Syria.

Sweden has a number of mosques providing the Muslim communities in Sweden places of worship. The first mosque in Sweden was the Nasir Mosque, built in 1976 in Gothenburg by the Ahmadiyya. It was followed by the Malmö Mosque, 1984, and later, the Uppsala Mosque in 1995. More mosques were built during the 2000s, including the Stockholm Mosque (2000) and the Fittja Mosque (completed 2007), among others. The governments of Saudi Arabia and Libya have financially supported the constructions of some of the largest Mosques in Sweden.

The first meeting between Muslim youth organizations across Europe first took place in Sweden in 1995, in which the Foreign Ministry of Sweden worked with Sveriges Unga Muslimer to hold an international conference titled "Islam in Europe." This led to the creation of the Forum of European Muslim Youth and Student Organizations (FEMYSO).

As of the year 2000, an estimated 300,000 to 350,000 people of Muslim background lived in Sweden, or 3.5% of total population; thereby included is anyone who fits the broad definition of someone who "belongs to a Muslim people by birth, has Muslim origin, has a name that belongs in the Muslim tradition, etc." regardless of personal religious convictions, of whom about 100,000 were second-generation immigrants (born in Sweden or immigrated as children). In Sweden registration by personal belief is not common and is normally against the law, thus only figures of practising Muslims belonging to an Islamic community can be reported. In 2009, the Muslim Council of Sweden reported 106,327 registered members.

In December 2008, riots broke out in Malmö in the Herrgården section of Rosengård, when the landlord did not renew the contract for the premises of a local mosque. Angry youths occupied the premises for three weeks, at the end of which police coming to evict the occupiers were confronted by about 30 occupiers, including radical Muslims and activists affiliated with the radical leftist Antifaschistische Aktion. The occupiers attacked police with pipe bombs and rocks and the incident rapidly escalated, with protestors arriving from other cities and officials calling in riot police. Rioters set fire to cars, wagons, kiosks, building sheds, recycling stations, and bicycle sheds. After two nights of rioting, 200 adult Malmö residents organized by the Islamiska kulturföreningen (“Islamic Cultural Forum”) moved into the streets to mediate, causing the youthful rioters to desist.

In September 2018, the mosque in Alby, Botkyrka via its Green Party member Ali Khali delivered an offer to the Moderate Party where the 3000 votes of the worshippers would be given to the Moderate Party in exchange for planning permission to build a new mosque. The Green Party forced Khalil to leave the party after the finding was made public by Swedish Television.

In September 2018, the Social Democratic Party in Karlshamn revoked the membership of a Muslim politician after translations from Arabic showed that the politician had campaigned for the supremacy of Islam over Swedish customs, against vulnerable children being taken care of by social services and that women with Arabic heritage should wear the Islamic veil. The statements were verified with interpreters.

In 2018, preschools in Biskopsgården district were reprimanded by the Municipality of Gothenburg after Göteborgs-Posten newspaper had found out that 4 out of 5 kindergartens stated they were willing to force girls in their care to wear the Islamic hijab if the parents requested it. The newspaper found a willingness by preschools to force at 27 of the 40 investigated institutions in Malmö, Gothenburg and Stockholm.

In April and May 2019, five senior members of the Swedish Muslim community were detained by the Swedish Migration Agency by orders of the Säpo security police.

In December 2019, the municipality of Skurup banned Islamic veils in educational institutions. Earlier, in May 2019, the municipality of Staffanstorp approved a similar ban. On 17 November 2020, the Administrative Courts in Malmö and Lund determined that both municipalities' decisions to prohibit headscarves, niqabs, and burqas in preschools and primary schools violated the constitutional right to freedom of religion and the European Convention on Human Rights. Both municipalities appealed, but on 23 June 2021, the Administrative Court of Appeal in Gothenburg upheld the initial rulings on the same grounds. On 8 December 2022, the Supreme Administrative Court overturned both bans, with Justice Ulrik von Essen stating that "in order for the restriction to be permissible, it must be supported by law" and that "legal support is lacking in national law and therefore the municipalities' decisions should be overturned".

On 12 October 2025, Christian Democrats (KD) leader and Deputy Prime Minister Ebba Busch proposed a nationwide ban on burqas and niqabs in public places such as streets, squares, shopping centres, and healthcare facilities. Education and Integration Minister and Leader of the Liberals Simona Mohamsson expressed support for stronger measures against religious oppression, including forced veiling, but did not explicitly endorse Busch’s proposal, and neither did any other party in the Tidö Government.

== Demography ==
The percentage of self-identified Muslims in Sweden from 1930 until 2016

Although there are no official statistics of Muslims in Sweden, estimates vary at different points:

In 1978 there was around 22,000-37,000. In 1989 this had risen to around an estimated 50,000 and 100,000 and in 1993 130,000.

In 2000, there was around 300,000—350,000 people of Muslim background. (i.e. anyone who fits the broad definition of someone who "belongs to a Muslim people by birth, has Muslim origin, has a name that belongs in the Muslim tradition, etc."), roughly estimated close to 100,000 of which are second-generation. Of the first-generation Muslims, 255,000 are thought to be Sunni, 5,000 Shi'ites, no more than 1,000 Ahmadiya, Alevi and other groups and probably no more than 5,000 converts – mainly women married to Muslim men. In 2009 a US report stated that there are 450,000 to 500,000 Muslims in Sweden, around 5% of the total population, and that the Muslim Council of Sweden reported 106,327 officially registered members. Swedish estimates are rather 350,000, including nominal Muslims and people from a Muslim background.

Such numbers do not imply religious beliefs or participation; Åke Sander claimed in 1992 that at most 40–50% of the people of Muslim background in Sweden "could reasonably be considered to be religious", and in 2004, based on discussions and interviews with Muslim leaders, concerning second-generation Muslims born and raised in Sweden that "it does not seem that the percentage they consider to be religious Muslims in a more qualified sense exceeds fifteen percent, or perhaps even less". Sander re-stated in 2004 that "we do not think it unreasonable to put the figure of religious Muslims in Sweden at the time of writing at close to 150,000". Professor Mohammad Fazlhashemi at Umeå University estimates "a good 100,000". About 25,000 are regarded as devout Muslims, visiting Friday prayers and practising daily prayers.

Muslims in Sweden most often originate from Iraq, Iran, Bosnia-Herzegovina, Sandžak and Kosovo, the Iraqis being by far the largest group in 2015. Most Iranians and Iraqis fled as refugees to Sweden during the Iran–Iraq War from 1980 to 1988. The second-largest Muslim group consists of immigrants or refugees from Eastern Europe, particularly from former Yugoslavian countries, most of them being Bosniaks, who number 12,000. There is also a sizeable community of Somalis, who numbered 40,165 in 2011. They are followed by Muslim refugees from Syria and Somalia, two very rapidly growing groups. Two other groups, residing in Sweden for a decade longer, are people from Turkey and Lebanon.

== Conversion ==
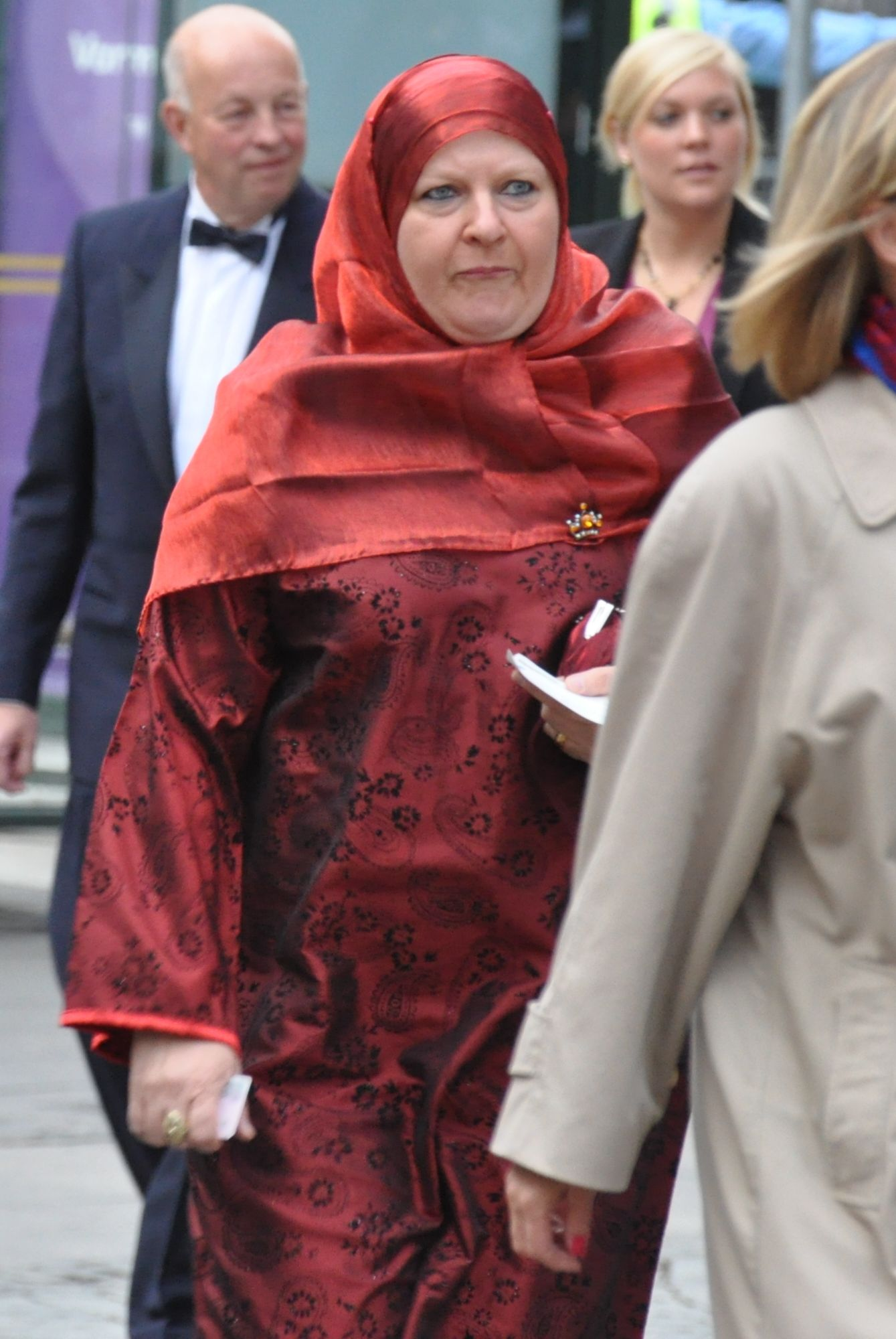
Helena Benaouda, a Swedish Finnish woman who converted to Islam, attending a royal wedding. She was head of Muslim Council of Sweden 2004–2014.

There are no official statistics on the exact number of Swedish converts to Islam, but Anne Sofie Roald, a historian of religions at Malmö University College, estimates the number of converts from the Church of Sweden to Islam to be 3,500 people since the 1960s. Roald further states that conversions are also occurring from Islam to the Church of Sweden, most noticeably by Iranians, but also by Arabs and Pakistanis.

The first known convert to Islam was the famous painter Ivan Aguéli who was initiated into the Shadhiliyya order in Egypt in 1909. It was Aguéli who introduced the French metaphysician René Guénon to Sufism. Aguéli is more known among Sufis by his Muslim name Abdul-Hadi al-Maghribi. Other well-known Swedish converts to Islam are Tage Lindbom, Kurt Almqvist, Mohammed Knut Bernström and Tord Olsson. Lindbom, Almqvist and Olsson are also initiates into various Sufi orders. Bernström translated the Quran into Swedish in 1998.

== Places of worship ==
Several mosques have been built in Sweden since the 1980s, with notable ones in Malmö (1984) and Stockholm (2000). The Bellevue Mosque and the Brandbergen Mosque in the 2000s came to public attention as recruitment and propaganda centers for Islamist terrorism.

In recent years, Islamic places of worship have increasingly been subject to vandalism. Swedish historian Mattias Gardell from Uppsala University sent a survey to 173 mosques, with 106 responding. 59% reported being subject to some sort of physical attack.

The following are some of the places of Islamic worship that can be found today in Sweden.

Name	Municipality	Year	Organization & sponsorship	Sect	Imam	Worship language
Metropolitan Stockholm
Stockholm Mosque	Stockholm, Medborgarplatsen	2000	Islamiska Förbundet i Stockholm, sponsored by United Arab Emirates	Sunni	Abu Mahmoud	Arabic, Swedish
Bangladesh Jame Masjid	23 Kocksgatan, Medborgarplatsen Stockholm			Sunni Hanafi		Bengali, Arabic
Fittja Mosque	Stockholm, Fittja	2007	Botkyrka Turkiska Islamiska Förening, sponsored by Turkey via Diyanet.	Sunni Hanafi		Arabic, Turkish
Brandbergen Mosque	Haninge (South Stockholm)		Haninge Islamiskt Kultur Center	Wahhabi/Salafi	Karim Laallam	Arabic
Imam Ali Mosque	Järfälla (West Stockholm)	1996	Ahl Al Bayt Assembly, sponsored by Iran	Shi'ite		Arabic, Persian, Swedish
Skogås Mosque, Skogås, Stockholm			Sunni			
Central Sweden
Gävle Mosque	Gävle		Run by "Al-Rashideen foundation", financed by a Qatari organisation. At the time the board of foundation had imam Riyad Al-Duhan among its members, today he calls himself Abo Raad. The Qatari organisation was founded by Abd al-Rahman bin Umayr al-Nuaymi, one of the major al-Qaeda financiers according to a researcher at Uppsala University.	Salafist	Riyad Al-Duhan aka Abo Raad	
Uppsala	Uppsala, Kvarngärdet	1995		Sunni		
Västernorrland Islamisk Förening	Örnsköldsvik, domsjö	2014		Sunni		
Örebro	Örebro, Vivalla	2008	Sponsored by Qatar In December 2017, the building was afire when firefighters arrived and it burned to the ground in December 2017.			
Metropolitan Gothenburg
Bellevue Mosque	Gothenburg, Bellevue		Islamic Sunni Centre, sponsored by Saudi Arabia	Wahhabi/Salafi		Arabic, Swedish
Turkish Mosque 1	Gothenburg, Hisingen			Sunni Hanafi		
Masjid Guraba	Gothenburg, Hisingen			Sunni		
Bosnian Mosque	Gothenburg, Bellevue		Islamic Community of Bosniaks Gothenburg	General		Bosnian, English
Nasir Mosque	Gothenburg, Högsbo	1976	Ahmadiyya Muslim Jama'at, sponsored by Pakistan	Ahmadiyya	Yahya Khan	Arabic, Swedish, Urdu
Angered Mosque	Gothenburg, Angered					
Trollhättan Mosque	Trollhättan	1985	Sponsored by Saudi Arabia, Kuwait, Oman and UAE	General		
Southern Sweden
Mahmood Mosque	Malmö	2016				
Malmö Mosque	Malmö	1984				
Muslimska församlingen i Malmö	Malmö	1972	Muslimska församlingen i Malmö (translation: Muslim congregation in Malmö) is a Turkish congregation connected to the Turkish directorate of Religious Affairs, Diyanet. According to its own records, it has 2200 members and is located on Sallerupsvägen. The imam was trained and sent by Diyanet. According to the Swedish Agency for Support to Faith Communities, the mosque has good relations to the Malmö Millî Görüş chapter. In 2011, after decades of collecting donations from its members, it bought a property to use as a mosque for 8 million SEK. In 2017, the congregation donated its property to Svenska Islam stiftelsen (Turkish: Isveç Diyanet Vakfı) which is part of Diyanet.			

== Community organisations, funding, and practices ==
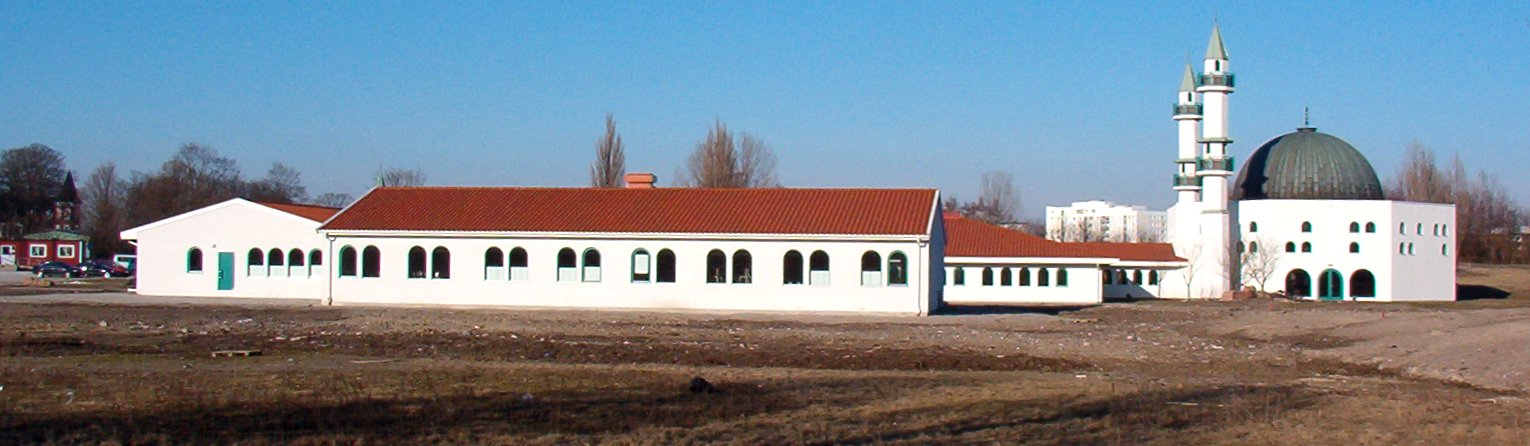
Mosque in Malmö

The beginning of nationwide Islamic (Sunni) institutions in Sweden dates back to the creation of FIFS (Förenade Islamiska Församlingar i Sverige) in 1973–1974. In 1982 and 1984 two splits, due to internal rivalries, cultural differences, personal conflicts and funding, brought to the creation of SMF (Svenska Muslimska Förbundet) and ICUS, today IKUS (Islamska Kulturcenterunionen i Sverige). Others national institutions are BHIRF (Bosnien-Hercegovinas Islamiska riksförbund), founded in 1995 by Bosnian refugees, IRFS (Islamiska Riksförbundet), also since 1995, and SIA (Svenska Islamiska Akademin), founded in 2000 by the former ambassador Mohammed Knut Bernström, with the task of establishing in the future an Islamic university in Sweden, charged with imam education. SIA also publishes since February 2001 the periodical Minaret in Swedish.

There exist also the women association IKF (Islamiska Kvinnoförbund i Sverige), the youth association IUF (Islamiska Ungdomförbundet i Sverige) and the imam association SIR (Sveriges Imamråd). IIF (Islamiska Informationföreningen) is a member association of FIFS aiming at providing information about Islam in Sweden; 1986–2000 it published Salaam, whose editorial board has always been dominated by women, mainly Swedish converts.

National and target organization have also created umbrella organizations in order to simplify their relationships to the state. FIFS and SMF have created in 1990 SMR (Sveriges Muslimska Råd), of which SUM is also member. The IKUS umbrella organization is named IRIS (Islamiska Rådet i Sverige) and includes also IKF, IUF and SIR. Above all, IS (Islamiska samarbetsrådet) deals with financial issues with the commission for state grants to religious communities (SST); it includes FIFS, SMF, IKUS, ISS and SIF.

=== Islamic Association in Sweden ===
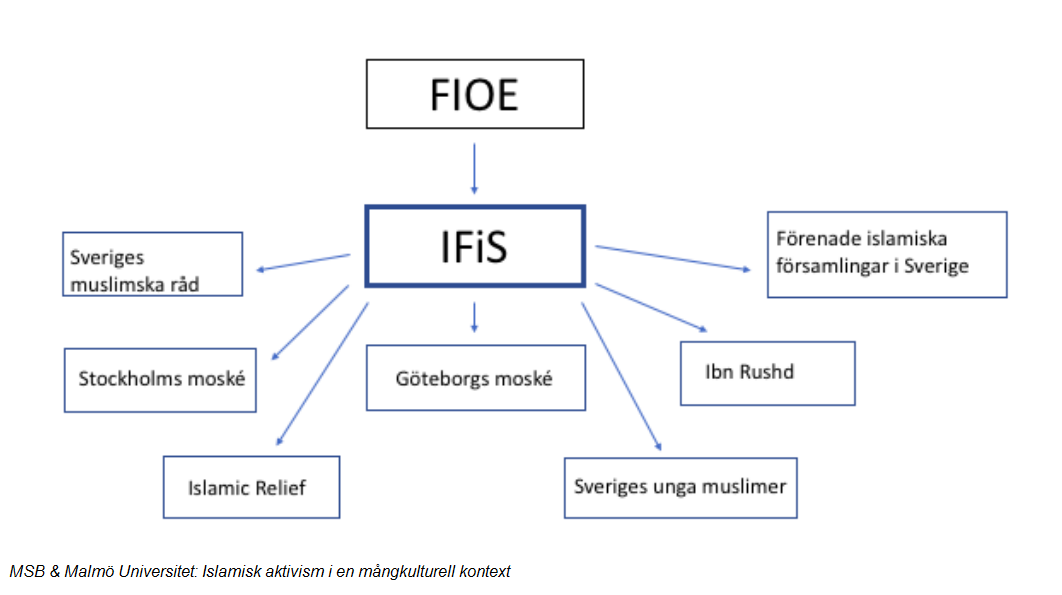
Islamic organizations in the FIOE-IFiS network in Sweden

The Islamic Association in Sweden (Arabic: الرابطة الأسلامية في السويد; Swedish: Islamiska förbundet i Sverige, IFiS) was formed according to the records of the Swedish Tax Agency, the protocol of the constituent meeting of The Islamic Association in Sweden (IFiS) on January 27–28, 1995 in the presence of Ahmed Ghanem, Mostafa Kharraki, Mahmoud Aldebe, Zoheir Berrahmoune, Mahmoud Kalim and Sami al-Sarif. The initiator is the Stockholm organisation Islamiska Förbundet i Stockholm, which runs Stockholm mosque and was found 1987. IFiS headquarters are located at Stockholm Mosque. According to the IFiS charter, it is a founding member in the Muslim Brotherhood-associated umbrella organisation Federation of Islamic Organisations in Europe whose guidelines it follows. It has started the following organisations, either alone or together with others:

- Islamic Relief in Sweden
- Muslim Youth of Sweden
- Islamiska informationsföreningen (IIF) (tr: Islamic information society)
- Union of Muslim Students in Sweden (Al Khawarizmy),
- Imam's Association
- Sweden's Islamic Schools (SIS)
- Muslim Woman Association
- Sweden's Muslim Scouts
- New Moon Cultural Association
- Quran Reader Society
- Ibn Rushd Study Association
- Muslim Council of Sweden (SMR)

Omar Mustafa is chairman of IFiS since 2011. On 7 April 2013 he was elected to the party committee of the Swedish Social Democratic Party, which was noted by anti-racist magazine Expo as Mustafa, as chairman of IFiS, had invited Salah Sultan and Ragheb Al-Serjany both of whom had spread antisemitic views in al Jazeera interviews and that he also "likes" Egyptian imam Yousef Al-Qaradawi on Facebook. During the Easter of 2013, IFiS invited Yvonne Ridley and Azzam Tamimi to a seminar to a conference it organised together with Ibn Rushd and Sveriges Unga Muslimer. As a result of the discoveries, Mustafa left the Social Democratic Party committee and party.

==== IFiS organization chart ====
IFiS is an umbrella organization.

Federation of Islamic; Organizations in Europe (FIOE)
IFiS
Muslim Council of Sweden	Stockholm mosque	Gothenburg Mosque	Islamic Relief	Sveriges Unga Muslimer	Ibn Rushd

=== Muslim Council of Sweden ===
The Muslim Council of Sweden (Swedish: Sveriges muslimska råd, SMR) is an umbrella organisation of Islamic organisations in Sweden. It was founded in 1990 by representatives of the Förenade islamiska församlingar i Sverige (FIFS), and the Muslim Association of Sweden (Swedish: Sveriges Muslimska Förbund, SMuF). The former chairwoman of the organisation is Helena Hummasten, who succeeded Mostafa Kharraki.

According to islamologist Sameh Egyptson at Lund University, several people in leadership positions of the council are Islamists and support the Muslim Brotherhood. The council organised a demonstration to protest when Mohamed Morsi was removed from office in Egypt.

In 1999, Mahmoud Aldebe was chairman of the council.

In 1999, the organisation was part of an alliance with the Religious Social Democrats (Swedish: Tro och Solidaritet) faction of the Social Democratic Party, where the council was to gain influence in Swedish politics via quotas for the number of Muslim politicians on election lists for council, region and Riksdag elections. Tro och Solidaritet was to further Islamic interests such as legislation and contracts concerning Muslim holidays, instituting a tax-financed training for imams via the National Agency for Higher Education and rules in working places for the Jumu'ah (Friday prayer). According to Religious Social Democrats chairman Peter Weiderud in 2014, the Religious Social Democrats were still in contact with SMR.

==== Muslim Youth of Sweden (Sveriges Unga Muslimer) ====
The organisation Muslim Youth of Sweden (Swedish: Sveriges Unga Muslimer, SUM) with its headquarters at Stockholm Mosque received state aid from the Swedish Agency for Youth and Civil Society (Swedish acronym: MUCF) in the years 2011–2015. SUM had to pay back the government funds for 2016 and 2017 due to the organisation failing to respect the ideals of democracy. A report outlined how sympathisers and activists for extremist movements had leading positions of local chapters of SUM.

A number of Swedish academics member of Antirasistiska Akademin (ArA), among them Edda Manga and Maimuna Abdullahi (also of MMRK) criticized the decision of MUCF to withhold further state aid to the organization.

SUM has a branch in Malmö, named Malmö Unga Muslimer.

In 2019, the administrative court of appeal upheld the decision to deny state aid to the organisation on the grounds that its representatives on occasion had made remarks incompatible with democracy and was ordered to repay 1.4 million SEK.

=== Islamic Relief ===
Islamic Relief in Sweden was founded in 1992 and is part of the international Muslim aid charity Islamic Relief which was founded in the UK.

IR in Sweden receives and channels tax funding primarily from government agencies Swedish International Development Cooperation Agency (SIDA) and ForumCiv. In 2019 IR Sweden received 167 million SEK and 139 million SEK in tax funding.

=== Muslim Association of Sweden ===
The Muslim Association of Sweden (Swedish: Sveriges muslimska förbund, SMF) is Sweden's largest Muslim organisation, which represents around 70,000 Muslims in Sweden, which receives state aid from Swedish Agency for Support to Faith Communities. The organization claims to be separate from the Muslim Brotherhood, but does claim to be inspired by its values. For example, one of the representatives of the organization, Mahmoud Aldebe, sent a letter in April 2006 to different Swedish political parties asking to exempt Muslims from Swedish divorce law.

=== MMRK ===
Muslimska Mänskliga Rättighetskommittén (MMRK) (loosely translated: "Muslim human rights committee") an organization modeled after the UK-based organisation Cageprisoner. MMRK consider the criminalisation of travelling to commit terror abroad to be a form of racial laws directed towards Muslims. MMRK also claim that returning Foreign Terrorist Fighters do not constitute a security threat. Spokesperson Maimuna Abdullahi also criticized suggestions that travelling to conflict zones should be criminalized in a letter published by Swedish Television.

In May 2010, Munir Awad was invited to speak at a seminar criticizing the anti-terrorism laws of Sweden organized by MMRK. Awad was arrested in December 2010 for the 2010 Copenhagen terror plot for which he was later convicted and sentenced to jail.

MMRK invited the Cageprisoners founders Moazzam Begg and Asim Qureshi to a seminar.

=== Diyanet ===
According to Dagens Nyheter in 2017, nine mosques in Sweden have imams sent and paid for by the Turkish Directorate of Religious Affairs (Diyanet). Along with their religious duties, the imams are also tasked with reporting on critics of theTurkish government. According to Dagens Nyheter, propaganda for president Erdogan is openly presented in the mosques.

The Diyanet director of the Swedish branch is Fatih Mehmet Karaca. In November 2016 Karaca forced the finance officer (Swedish: kassör) of Muslimska församlingen i Malmö mosque (listed above) to resign as the finance officer had expressed views critical of the AKP party which is intolerable according to Diyanet ideology.

=== Swedish Muslims for Peace and Justice ===
The Swedish Muslims for Peace and Justice is a self-described peace organization. It was founded in 2008 by a group including the Swedish Parliamentarian Mehmet Kaplan. Kaplan was forced to resign from the Swedish Cabinet due to his association with advocates of violent attacks on Armenians and connections to Islamist militants in Turkey. In 2018 it was headed by former Green Party politician Yasri Khan. Khan was forced to leave the Green Party after he was nominated to the party committee while refusing to shake hands with women on religious grounds.

=== Hizb ut-Tahrir ===
In 2012, investigating magazine Expo wrote that the anti-democratic and antisemitic Islamist group Hizb ut-Tahrir had started to establish itself in Sweden. In October 2012 Hizb ut-Tahrir situated its annual "calpiphate conference" in Stockholm. The group at the time had a section for all of Scandinavia which was primarily active in Denmark. The group does not recognize the caliphate as established by ISIL.

In the 2014 and 2018 Swedish general elections, the group campaigned in the Stockholm area for Muslims not to vote.

According to Sayed Jalabi in 2018, the organisation aims to organise a not necessarily violent coup d'état to overthrow the Government of Sweden and instead create a caliphate.

According to a Hizb ut-Tahrir spokesperson for Scandinavia, the organization does not strive to change the political system in Western countries. The Quilliam Foundation, composed of defectors from extremist organizations, Hizb ut-Tahrir does not believe in democratic and open societies and that they hide their intention to abolish democracy in the West.

=== Educational organizations, their funding, and practices ===
==== Ibn rushd studieförbund ====
Ibn rushd is an educational organization (Swedish: studieförbund) financed by state subsidies from Folkbildningsrådet, a government agency. Principal of the organization (Swedish: förbundsrektor) is Omar Mustafa. The organization gives courses in Dawah (Islamic missionary work). Together with Muslim Youth of Sweden, Ibn Rushd organizes the annual event Muslimska Familjedagarna (MFD) where proponents of sharia law have been invited to seminars.

In 2015, Anas Altikriti was invited to hold a speech at the MFD event.

In 2017, Ibn rushd received 27 million Swedish crowns in state aid for its activities and a further 4.7 million for education of asylum seekers.

==== Al-Salamskolan ====
Al-Salamskolan is a charter school in Örebro. It receives about 150-200 thousand Swedish crowns every month from a Saudi foundation connected to the al-Haramain Foundation. The school is run by a foundation controlled by Saudi nationals. Music is banned at the school. Boys and girls are segregated into groups along gender lines for several subjects due to religious reasons. Beyond the national curriculum, the pupils receive ten hours of tuition in Islam and Arabic, which according to the former headmaster at the school was mandatory. In 2017, the school received a 500 000 SEK fine from the Swedish Schools Inspectorate due to deficiencies in its teaching practises. In 2017 the school wanted to fire the chairman of Al-Risalah Scandinavian Foundation, the foundation that funds the school, due to him not being able to be present for meetings.

==== El Dagve charter school ====
El Dagve was a Muslim charter school in Jönköping. Headmaster Hassan Meri immatriculated children to the school and received funding from the Jönköping Municipality but sent the pupils to school in their home countries instead, keeping the difference. In 2004 the school was closed by Swedish Work Environment Authority.

=== Islamic banking ===
Al-Azharskolan (Al-Azhar school) is a foundation which runs charter schools with a Muslim profile. In 2019, four of members of the board of directors were convicted of aggravated fraud for having funneled school funds towards a banking project, which would have become the first Islamic bank (which would not have charged interest) in Sweden. Starting a bank would have required around 100-150 million SEK, but existing Swedish banks did not want to facilitate the transfer of funds from investors in the Middle East to Sweden. The Al-Azhar school also caused controversy in 2016 when its school in Vällingby had gender segregated gym classes for children. The Swedish Schools Inspectorate also criticized the school for holding prayers during lesson hours, which violates educational law in Sweden. Of the seven accused, two were acquitted. The verdict was upheld in the appeals court.

As several of the accused also were involved in collecting funds for the construction of a mosque in Rinkeby, the construction company NCC withdrew from the project.

== Swedish attitudes towards Islam ==
Sentiment of Islam in Sweden 2005-2015

As religion a few decades earlier was viewed as receding phenomenon, during the decade leading up to 2016 religion was again in the mainstream discourse due to international conflicts being interpreted in religious terms. In the last SOM survey in 2016 by Gothenburg University, the perception of Islam among the public had become more negative.

In 2006, a survey by the SOM Institute showed that half the Swedish population was negative towards Islam, where 7% expressed a positive attitude, 40% were undecided and 53% were negative. The poll showed that 48% were positive towards Christianity, the most positively rated religion.

In 2007, a study by the Integrationsverket government agency showed that 55% of respondents among the population of Sweden expressed reservations about moving to districts where many Muslims live. This was the same as for 2005.

In 2014, a poll by Gävle University College found that when asked about their attitudes towards veils, in the case of the niqab and the burqa, 84% responded that the niqab was unacceptable and 81% saw the burqa in the same light, indicating a near-universal opposition to these external coverings. The chador was deemed unacceptable by 37% and a "clear majority" found the hijab and the shayla acceptable, 65.0 and 65.2 percent respectively. The report stated that "The question seems to arouse strong feelings against oppression versus the right to wear the clothes you want." The poll showed a slight increase in acceptance for the public wearing of veils. It also stated that "a clear majority (64.4%) of the Swedish population consider Muslim women to be more oppressed than other women in Sweden.". Of the respondents, 26% expressed resistance to all kinds of Islamic veils. In 2017, the Swedish National Board of Student Aid (CSN) eased its longtime grants and loans to students going to Islamic University of Madinah in Saudi Arabia, a religious school for missionaries proselytising the wahhabist variant of Islam. An investigation by Dagens Nyheter found that 71 students had travelled from Sweden with CSN funding since year 2000. The ban of grants was due to that neither women nor non-Muslims in general are allowed to study at Madinah and the ban encompassed all studies at all institutions being hostile to democracy.

According to a 2018 poll by Sifo, 60% of the 1000 participants wanted to ban the Islamic call to prayer using loudspeakers, while 21% responded they should be allowed and 19% were undecided.

== Salafism ==
The Swedish Security Service estimated that there may be about 2,000 Swedish adherents of the puritanical Salafist movement within Sunni Islam. The Salafi movement is split between inward-looking purists and passivists, versus those who are militant. This last group is further divided into those who advocate militant defensive jihad in defense of Muslims, and those who advocate an offensive jihad along the lines of Al-Qaeda or ISIS. The majority of Salafists are passive and inward-oriented, while a small minority are oriented towards offensive jihadism - as opposed a so-called defensive jihad against outside aggression. Unlike in other parts of Europe, there are no Salafi organizations which openly preach jihad in Sweden - Salafi thought is instead spread by informal networks.

In Salafist circles, while topics in the main are uncontroversial, derogatory views towards women, homosexuals, non-believers, and Western governments are frequently expressed. It is also stressed that Muslims should not integrate into wider Swedish society. The Swedish Defence University concluded in its 2018 report on Salafism in Sweden that since according to Salafi doctrine only following the religious laws is allowed, Salafism is an anti-democratic movement. In contrast to non-Salafis, Salafists preach in Swedish.

In the Stockholm area, non-militant Salafists are predominant in the Tensta and Rinkeby areas among Salafists, while a militant and al-Qaeda supporting movement was predominant in Skärholmen, Alby and Norsborg.

== Violent Islamic extremism ==
According to the Swedish Defence University, since the 1970s, a number of residents of Sweden have been implicated in providing logistical and financial support to or joining various foreign-based transnational Islamic militant groups. Among these organizations are Hezbollah, Hamas, the GIA, Al-Qaeda, the Islamic State, Al-Shabaab, Ansar al-Sunna and Ansar al-Islam.

In the 2000s, according to Europol, Islamists in Sweden were not primarily seeking to commit attacks in Sweden, but were rather using Sweden as a base of operations against other countries and for providing logistical support for groups abroad.

In 2010, the Swedish Security Service estimated that a total of 200 individuals were involved in the Swedish violent Islamist extremist milieu. According to the Swedish Defence University, most of these militants were affiliated with the Islamic State, with around 300 people traveling to Syria and Iraq to join the group and Al-Qaeda associated outfits like Jabhat al-Nusra in the 2012-2017 period.

In the Stockholm area, all networks involving jihadists are also involved in ordinary crime such as theft, burglary, and blackmail whereby they acquire income. Income received from illegal narcotics trading are also used finance jihadist activity as sympathizers with an ideology which uses violence to reach a higher goal will automatically be drawn into crime. In the Stockholm area, individuals who have joined jihadists in Syria and Iraq have predominantly been male, whereas in Gothenburg they have been both male and female.

In 2017, Swedish Security Service director Anders Thornberg stated that the number of violent Islamic extremists residing in Sweden to number was estimated to be "thousands". The Danish Security and Intelligence Service judged the number of jihadis in Sweden to be a threat against Denmark since two terrorists arriving from Sweden had already been sentenced in the 2010 Copenhagen terror plot.

In March 2018, Kurdish authorities reported they had captured 41 IS supporters with either Swedish citizenship or residence permit in Sweden, of which 5 had key positions in the organization and one was the head of the ISIL propaganda efforts.

According to interviews with authorities in November 2018, about half of those who joined the Islamic State and other groups in the Syrian Civil War had returned to Sweden. Some of the returnees are still radicalized and constitute a security threat.

Under the alias "Abu Bakr al Janabi", an individual located in Sweden translated Islamic State material. As such, he was interviewed by Vice News and The Guardian. In December 2017, 30-year-old Alftaf Yasin Tarid, a KTH Royal Institute of Technology alumn who was born in Iraq, travelled on a flight from Stockholm to Schiphol and he was later arrested when travelling in a car in Rotterdam after meeting other individuals. US authorities had tipped off their Dutch colleagues that Altaf had spread Islamic State propaganda from Sweden under the alias "Abu Bakr Al-Janabi". In December 2018, the trial began which went unreported in Swedish media. In January 2019 he was sentenced to three years in jail for disseminating IS propaganda.

In June 2019, two imams, Abo Raad active at Gävle mosque and another active in Umeå were deported due to them promoting violent extremism. The son of Raad was also to be deported along with other individuals involved in the Islamist scene in Sweden bringing the total to five.

=== Terrorist attacks and plots ===
- 2010 Stockholm bombings
- 20-year-old A. Sevigin was detained in February 2016 for attempting to construct a splinter bomb. He was sentenced to five years in prison by Attunda district court for breaching the terrorist laws. The psychiatric evaluation concluded that he was acting from his religious conviction. Previously he had travelled to Turkey in an attempt to join the Islamic State.
- 2017 Stockholm truck attack
- On 31 April 2018, 46-year-old man who had arrived as a refugee from Uzbekistan was arrested when police searched and found explosives on his property. In March 2019 he was sentenced to 7 years in prison for planning a terrorist attack in Sweden in the name of the Islamic State and financing serious crime. He was also given a deportation order and a ban from returning to Sweden again. Four other men were sentenced for falsifying documents or financing serious crime and received prison sentences ranging from 1 to 6 months in prison.

== Controversies ==
=== Antisemitism ===
A government study in 2006 estimated that 5% of the total adult population and 39% of adult Muslims "harbour systematic antisemitic views". The former prime minister Göran Persson described these results as "surprising and terrifying". However, the rabbi of Stockholm's Orthodox Jewish community, Meir Horden, said, "It's not true to say that the Swedes are antisemitic. Some of them are hostile to Israel because they support the weak side, which they perceive the Palestinians to be."

=== Morality police ===
Investigating journalists at TV4 reported that self-appointed morality police in migrant areas such as Rinkeby, Tensta, Husby and Hjulsta harass women for wearing skirts, owning dogs or going out alone without the company of a male. The phenomenon has also been reported in the Brandkärr district of Nyköping according to a report by the municipality.

=== Muslim Council of Sweden ===
Swedish social anthropologist Aje Carlbom and parliamentarian Abderisak Aden, who has founded the Islamic Democratic Institute (Islamiska demokratiska institutet), have both stated that they believe that at least part of the leading members of SMR support Islamist ideologies and are influenced by the Egyptian Muslim Brotherhood.

The Muslim Council of Sweden (SMR), an umbrella organization for Swedish Muslim organizations, has been involved in several controversies. In 2006 Mahmoud Aldebe, one of the board members of SMR, sent letters to each of the major political parties in Sweden demanding special legislation for Muslims in Sweden, including the right to specific Islamic holidays, special public financing for the building of Mosques, that all divorces between Muslim couples be approved by an Imam, and that Imams should be allowed to teach Islam to Muslim children in public schools. The request was condemned by all political parties and the government and the Swedish Liberal Party requested that an investigation be started by the Office of the Exchequer into the use of public funding of SMR. The chairman of the Board of SMR subsequently stated that it supported the demands made by Aldebe but that it did not think that the letter had been a good idea to communicate them in a list of demands.

Although the Board of SMR did not condemn Aldebe the letter has caused conflict within the organization. SMR has also been accused of being closely allied to the Swedish Social Democratic Party, which has been criticised both inside and outside the party.

=== Brandbergen Mosque ===
The Brandbergen Mosque has been described by the FBI terrorism consultant Evan Kohlmann as a propaganda central for the Armed Islamic Group (GIA). According to Kohlmann, people connected to the mosque also participated in the financing of GIA's bombing campaign in France in 1995.

In 2004 an Arabic-language manual, which carried the logo and address of the Brandbergen Mosque, was spread on the internet. The manual described the construction of simple chemical weapons, including how to build a chemical munition from an ordinary artillery round. On December 7, 2006, the Swedish citizen Mohamed Moumou, who is described by the United States Department of the Treasury as an "uncontested leader of an extremist group centered around the Brandbergen Mosque in Stockholm", was put on the United Nations Security Council Committee 1267 list of foreign terrorists.

=== Discrimination against women ===
In 2012, the SVT program Uppdrag granskning visited 10 mosques once with a hidden camera and once with a visible camera. When the representatives were aware of being filmed, they stated that they supported values such as gender equality; however, when two undercover journalists posed as Muslim women with difficulties in their marriage, the answers from the majority of the visited imams were different. The imams told the women that they were expected to sleep with their husbands even if they did not want to and that they were to accept being beaten, and strongly discouraged them from going to the police. Since about half of the visited mosques receive state or local funding, they are expected to promote basic values of Swedish society, such as equal rights between genders and to counteract discrimination and violence.

=== Radical preachers invited to Sweden ===
In March 2014, Malmö Municipality withdrew financial support to a local association because they invited a Syrian lecturer who says that homosexuality should be punished by death to a charity event. The organisers said that the lecturer would not attend and hold no speeches, but after a video recording showed him holding a lecture, the sum of money was recalled.

In January 2015, Sigtuna council stopped radical Islamic preacher Haitham al-Haddad from holding a lecture at their premises. He had been invited by Märsta Unga Muslimer (tr: Muslim Youth of Märsta) but when the council was informed of the preacher's homophobic and antisemitic views, the council cancelled the rental contract.

According to criticism by British think-tank Quilliam in May 2015, Sweden is more likely than other countries to allow preachers with radical views to enter the country and spread their views.

In May 2015, radical preacher Said Rageahs was invited to the mosque in Gävle where he promoted the views that whoever insults Mohammed should be killed along with apostates and advocated segregation between Muslims and non-Muslims. The local imams at Gävle mosque ran the webpage Muslim.se which espoused similar views (with the death penalty for homosexuality added) and according to Islamologist Jan Hjärpe at Lund University, their views are typical of the Wahhabi.

=== Hate crimes against Muslims ===
Some Muslims have been victims of violence because of their religion. In October 1991, Shahram Khosravi, a 25-year-old student of Iranian origin, was shot in the face outside the Stockholm University by John Ausonius. In 1993, two young Somali immigrants were stabbed and a local mosque in the city was burned down. The perpetrators of the stabbing were said by police to have been motivated by racial hatred.

The Imam Ali Islamic Centre in Järfälla, the largest Shia mosque in Sweden, was burned down in May 2017 in what police suspect was arson.

==== 2003 and 2005 arson attacks on the Malmö Mosque ====
An arson attack on the Malmö Mosque took place in 2003, which damaged the mosque and totally destroyed other buildings at the Islamic Center. Another attack took place in October 2005.

==== 2014 mosque arson attacks in Sweden ====
A series of arson attacks took place during one week at the end of 2014 on three mosques in Sweden. In addition to being struck by Molotov cocktails, some mosques were vandalized with racist graffiti.

== Notable Swedish Muslims ==
- Mahmoud Aldebe, chairman of the Muslim Association of Sweden (SMF)
- Kurt Almqvist, Swedish poet
- Nadja Awad, Swedish politician
- Mohammed Knut Bernström, former Swedish diplomat who converted to Islam
- Kerim Chatty, Swedish-Tunisian man who was suspected of attempted hijacking of an aircraft in 2002
- Siavosh Derakhti, Swedish social activist, founder of Young People Against Anti-Semitism and Xenophobia
- Mehdi Ghezali, Swedish-Algerian detainee at Guantanamo Bay
- Helena Hummasten, Finnish-Swedish former chair of the Swedish Muslim Council
- Badou Jack, Swedish professional boxer
- Nadia Jebril, Swedish-Palestinian journalist and TV host at the Swedish television (SVT)
- Mehmet Kaplan, Swedish-Turkish politician who served as Minister for Housing and Urban Development
- Osama Krayem, convicted terrorist, mass murderer and war criminal (Palestinian parents from Syria)
- Emir Kujović, Bosniak-Swedish Swedish former professional footballer
- Tage Lindbom, Swedish mystic and conservative philosopher
- Yksel Osmanovski, Swedish-Turkish former professional footballer
- Nalin Pekgul, Swedish-Kurdish Social Democratic politician
- Sofie Louise Johansson Petra, Swedish member of the Kelantan royal family as the wife of Tengku Muhammad Fa-iz Petra
- Ahmned Rami, Moroccan-Swedish writer, political activist, coup d'état participant and military officer
- Sibel Redžep, Macedonian-born Swedish pop singer
- William Thorson, Swedish professional poker player
- Abdirizak Waberi, Somali–Swedish Moderate Party politician
- Mikail Yüksel, Swedish-Turkish politician, founder and leader of the Muslim Nuance Party
- Maher Zain, Lebanese-Swedish R&B singer, songwriter and music producer

== See also ==
- Ahmadiyya in Sweden
- Bosniaks in Sweden
- Turks in Sweden
- Somalis in Sweden
- Syrians in Sweden
- Iraqis in Sweden
- Alleged state-sponsored kidnappings of Muslims in Sweden
- Halal-TV
- Religion in Sweden
- Lars Vilks Muhammad drawings controversy
- History of Islam in the Arctic and Subarctic regions

== Bibliography ==
- Sander, Åke (1990), Islam and Muslims in Sweden, Göteborg: Centre for the Study of Cultural Contact and International Migration, Gothenburg University
- Sander, Åke (2004), "Muslims in Sweden", by Muhammad Anwar, Jochen Blaschke and Åke Sander, State Policies Towards Muslim Minorities: Sweden, Great Britain and Germany, Berlin: Parabolis
