= List of mosques in Scandinavia =

This is a list of mosques in Scandinavia. This includes the Scandinavian countries of Denmark, Norway and Sweden.

== Denmark ==
Key
- AMJ: Ahmadiyya
- W: Wahhabism
- S: Sunni Islam
- Sh: Shia Islam
- T: Turkish
- U: Unknown

Name	Images	City	Year	G	Remarks
Nusrat Djahan Moske		Copenhagen (Hvidovre)	1967	AMJ	First mosque in Scandinavia, financed solely by the female members of the Ahmadiyya Muslim Community.
Hamad Bin Khalifa Civilisation Center		Copenhagen (Nørrebro)	19 June 2014	S	Second purpose-built mosque in Denmark, part of the Hamad Bin Khalifa Civilisation Center, financed by the former Emir of Qatar.
Imam Ali Mosque	Imam Ali Moskeen	Copenhagen (Nordvest)	1 October 2015	Sh	Third purpose-built mosque in Denmark.
Ayasofya Mosque		Roskilde	10 May 2018	T	Mostly Turkish.
Mariam Mosque			2017		.

== Norway ==
Name	Images	City	Year	G	Remarks
World Islamic Mission mosque		Oslo	1995	S	
Nur mosque		Oslo	1980	AMJ	
Urtehagen mosque		Oslo	1991	S	
Baitun Nasr Mosque		Oslo	2011	AMJ	Biggest mosque in Norway Inaugurated on 30 September 2011
Tauheed Mosque		Oslo	2014	Sh	Inaugurated in June 2014
Al Nor mosque		Tromsø		U	World's northernmost mosque

== Sweden ==
Name	Images	City	Year	G	Remarks
Nasir Mosque		Gothenburg	1976	AMJ	First mosque in Sweden
Masjid Aysha		Stockholm		S	
Gothenburg Mosque		Gothenburg	2011	W	
Bellevue Mosque		Gothenburg		W	
Malmö Mosque		Malmö	1984	S	
Stockholm Mosque		Stockholm	2000	U	
Falun Islamiska Center		Falun	2011	S	
Fittja Mosque		Stockholm	2007	T	Turkish mosque
Gävle Mosque		Gävle		S	
Uppsala Mosque		Uppsala	1995	S	
Trollhättan Mosque		Trollhättan		Sh	
Imam Ali Mosque		Järfälla		Sh	
Sundsvalls Islamiska Kulturcenter		Sundsvall		U	
Alingsås Islamiska Center		Alingsås		U	
Ahlul Alkheir moskén		Solna		U	
Järfälla Islamiska Föreningen		Järfälla		U	
Skogås Islamiska Center		Skogås		S	
Zainabiya Islamic Center		Märsta		Sh (?)	

== See also ==
- Islam in Denmark
- Islam in Finland
- Islam in Norway
- Islam in Sweden
