= Yasri Khan =

Swedish politician (born 1986)

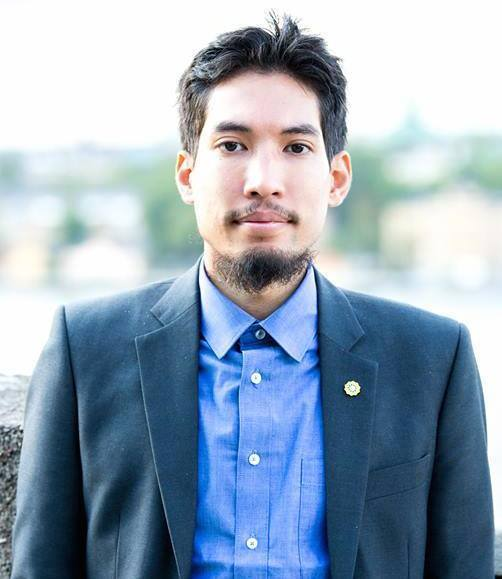
Yasri Khan in 2014.

Yasri Khan (born 2 April 1986 in Stockholm) is a Swedish politician and the leader of organization Swedish Muslims for Peace and Justice.

Khan was a member of the Swedish Green Party, but left the party due to heavy criticism for refusing to shake hands with a female reporter from TV4. Khan himself stated that he was raised in the way that a handshake was too intimate, but didn't mean to disrespect women, and also noted that politics was not the right field for him.

Khan was invited to participate in the United States' International Visitor Leadership Program in 2011. This experience is run by the U.S. Department of State "through public-private partnerships and tax payer funding.

== Gryningeskolan charter school ==
Khan was chairman of company Johai which ran the Gryningeskolan charter school with a Swedish-Muslim profile in Botkyrka between 2015 and 2017 for academic years 1–6. The school offered extracurricular teaching of Arabic and Islam. In 2012, the municipality rejected the school's application to extend its education to academic years 7–9, which was motivated by the municipality having reservations on how faith schools contribute to segregation. The school received heavy criticism from the Swedish School Inspectorate. On 25 June 2018, the inspectorate revoked Johai's permission to continue running the school due to a number of deficiencies:

- pupils with a foreign mother tongue did not receive adequate instruction in the Swedish language
- the school failed to provide a safe and calm environment conducive to learning
- the physical education did not follow the national curriculum
- only 20% of teaching staff were certified teachers
