= Sveriges Unga Muslimer =

Islamic youth umbrella organisation in Sweden

- Abbreviation: SUM
- Formation: 1991; 35 years ago
- Location: Stockholm Mosque
- Affiliations: Ship to Gaza Sweden
- Formerly called: Sveriges Muslimska Ungdomsförbund (SMUF)

Sveriges Unga Muslimer (SUM), previously named Sveriges Muslimska Ungdomsförbund (SMUF), is an Islamic youth umbrella organisation in Sweden. The organisation was formed in 1991. SUM itself a member organisation of the following umbrella organisations: the Muslim Council of Sweden, Forum for European Muslim Youth and Student Organisations (FEMYSO) and Ibn Rushd studieförbund. In 2016 it had about 4000 members.

SUM, along with other Muslim community organisations has its headquarters at Stockholm mosque.

SUM is a supporting organisation to Ship to Gaza Sweden.

The organisation has an annual conference in the Kista district of Stockholm, with about 800-1500 participants aged 15–25.

In 1995, the organisation helped organise the Euro-Islam conference in Lidingö organised on a directive from the Swedish Ministry for Foreign Affairs. This conference resulted in the founding of FEMYSO. According to French islamologist Gilles Kepel the youth section of this conference was dominated by participants with connections to the Muslim Brotherhood and similar forms of ideology, for instance the Young Muslims UK and Jamat-i Islami. However, it later turned out that his information was derived from a smear campaign commissioned by the United Arab Emirates.

In 2003, the organisation received a grant of 400 000 SEK from the Swedish Inheritance Fund for a project on Islamophobia as form of racism.

In 2010, the organisation invited Abdullah Hakim Quick to its annual conference, which was criticised by the Swedish Federation for Lesbian, Gay, Bisexual and Transgender Rights (RFSL) in a public debate because of his homophobic views. SUM claimed they did not know his opinions on homosexuality. SUM later cancelled the invitation.

In 2011 SUM invited Yvonne Ridley to a seminar in Tensta. She was invited again in 2013 to Muslimska Familjedagarna (translation: "Muslim family days"), an event organised by SUM, Islamic Association in Sweden and Ibn Rushd study company other Muslim community organisation, which was noted by anti-fascist magazine Expo due to Ridley's antisemitic views.

In 2016 SUM criticised that Mehmet Kaplan, a former chairman of SUM who later joined and rose in the ranks of the Green Party, had been forced to resign from his position as Minister for Housing and Urban Development after his connections to Turkish extremists and nationalists were made public.

In the spring of 2016, chairman Rashid Musa criticised the stricter anti-terrorism legislation in then coming into force in Sweden and alleged the legislation discriminated against Muslims in Sweden.

The organisation received state aid from the Swedish Agency for Youth and Civil Society (Swedish acronym: MUCF) in the years 2011-2015. SUM had to pay back the government funds for 2016 and 2017 due to the organisation failing to respect the ideals of democracy. A report outlined how sympathisers and activists for extremist movements had leading positions of local chapters of SUM.

In 2017, chairman Rashid Musa led a seminar on Islamophobia organised by the Stockholm chapter of Swedish Social Democratic Youth League (SSU) where white people were barred from attending. Lena Rådström Baastad, the secretary of the mother party Swedish Social Democratic Party, commented that the social democrats would never organize an ethnically segregated event.

== Member organisations ==
- Mångkulturella Ungdoms Center (MKUC) (translation: "multicultural youth centre") has its address at the Bellevue Mosque in Gothenburg. During a criminal investigation against a member of MKUC leadership, police found videos promoting violent jihadism in the computers of the MKUC office.
- Eskilstuna Unga Muslimer two members of the leadership, Karzan Fares and Diary Mohammed travelled to Syria in November 2015 where they joined a jihadist group loyal to al-Qaeda. One of them posted pictures of jihadist Anwar al-Awlaki in social media. In August 2016 Karzan Fares was reported as killed in Syria.
- Märsta Unga Muslimer in Märsta near Stockholm invited salafist Abdur Raheem Green to a lecture in 2012.

== Leadership & notable members ==
- Mehmet Kaplan, chairman 2000-2002
- Barlin Nur, 2004-2008
- Omar Mustafa, general secretary 2010
- Rashid Musa, chairman 2016
- Fida al-Sayed
