= Muslim Association of Sweden =

Islamic organization based in Sweden

- Sveriges muslimska förbund
- Abbreviation: SMF
- Website: Official website (in Swedish)

The Muslim Association of Sweden (Swedish: Sveriges muslimska förbund, SMF) is Sweden's largest Muslim organisation, which represents around 70,000 Muslims in Sweden, which receives state aid from Swedish Agency for Support to Faith Communities.

In the mid 1980s Mahmoud Aldebe, the chairman of SMF, in conjunction with the National Swedish Immigration and Naturalization Board (the former name of the Swedish Migration Agency) he authored the leaflet "Islam in Sweden" (Swedish: Islam i Sverige) wherein he expresses the view that Islam is an all-encompassing belief system which gives firm instructions which are to be followed in all aspects of daily life: moral, spiritual, political and economic. In 2006, as the chairman of SMF he authored a letter to every party in the Swedish parliament (Swedish: Riksdag) where it was demanded that Muslims receive a special set of laws and rules: imams must approve divorces, schools should teach Muslim children Arabic and religion in segregated groups and that boys and girls should not have lessons in swimming together. Aldebe also demanded that employers give Muslims two extra days of paid days off to celebrate Islamic holidays. Other Muslim organizations in Sweden, including the umbrella organisation, the Muslim Council of Sweden, distanced themselves from the letter, and Aldebe was forced to withdraw his proposal as members of his own association opposed it. Aldebe's ideas of an all-encompassing Islam and demands that Swedish ideas about what belong to the secular part of society must be reformed, are founded in the ideology of Islamist Hassan al-Banna.

Since 2010 the organizations new chairman is Tahir Akan. He has chosen to strengthen the brand of the organization and strengthen the public supports among Muslims, specially among young Muslims and Muslim professionals by associating itself with the Muslim Peace movement Swedish Muslims for Peace and Justice (SMPJ). Together the different organizations has cooperated with social work where young professionals from SMPJ has led campaigns in mosques run by the Muslim Association of Sweden.

In November 2026, Egypt designated the Muslim Association of Sweden as a terrorist organization.
