= Imam Ali Mosque (Copenhagen) =

Mosque in Nordvest, Copenhagen, Denmark

- Imam Ali Moske
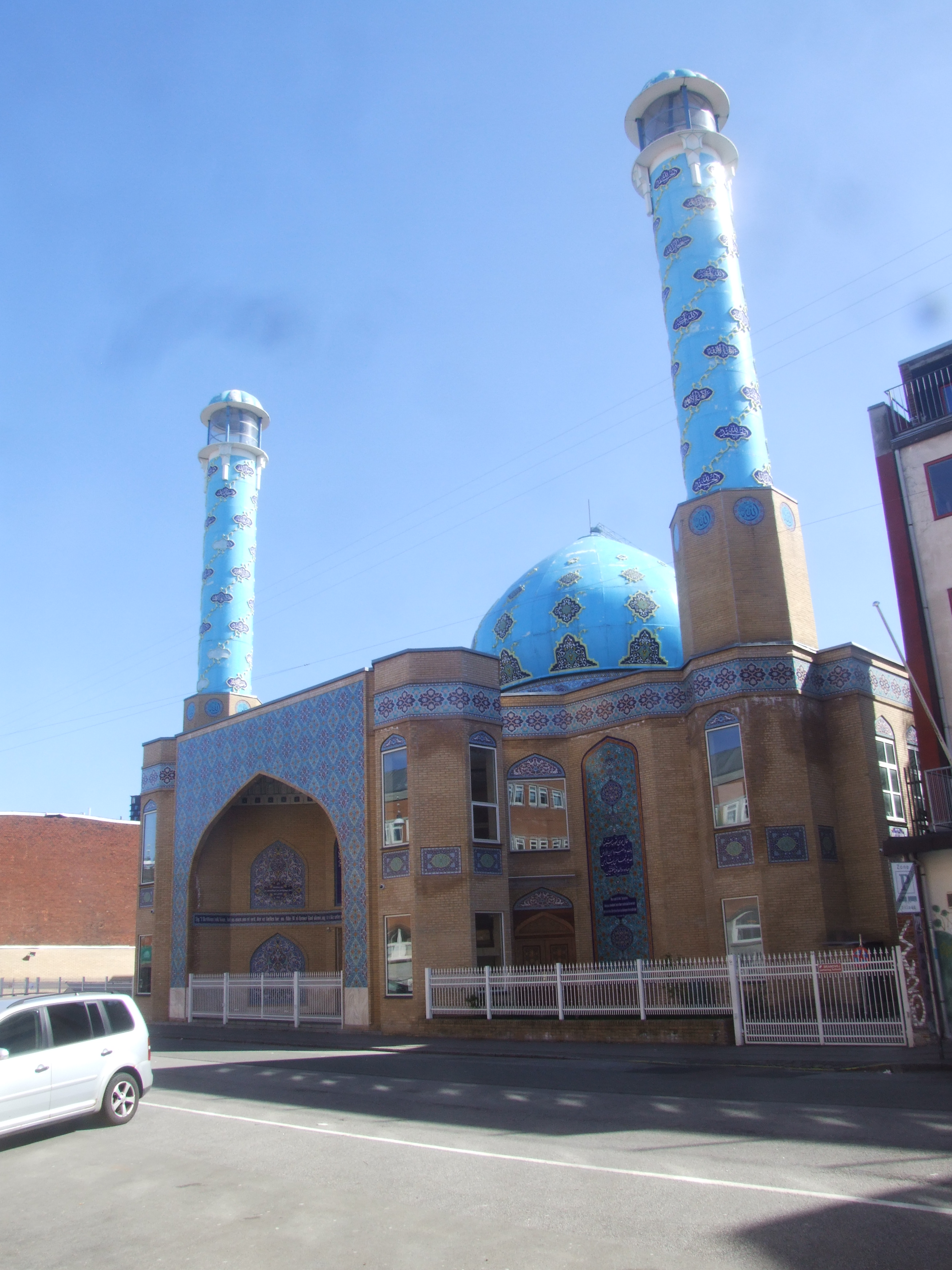

- Location of the mosque in Copenhagen

Religion
- Affiliation: Shia Islam
- Ecclesiastical or organizational status: Mosque
- Status: Active

Location
- Location: Nørrebro, Copenhagen
- Country: Denmark
- Interactive map of Imam Ali Mosque
- Coordinates: 55°42′0″N 12°31′55″E

Architecture
- Architect: Bijan Eskandani
- Type: Mosque
- Style: Neo-Iranian
- Creator: Imam Sayed Mohammad Khademi Sadr
- Groundbreaking: 2009
- Completed: 2015 (Eid al-Ghadir)
- Construction cost: 250-280 kr. million

Specifications
- Capacity: 1,500 worshippers
- Interior area: 2,100 m^{2} (23,000 sq ft)
- Dome: 1
- Minaret: 2
- Minaret height: 32 m (105 ft)

Website
- imamalimoske.dk (in Danish)

The Imam Ali Mosque (Danish: Imam Ali Moske; Persian: مسجد امام علی, romanized: Masjed-e Emām Ali; Arabic: مسجد الإمام علي, romanized: Masjid al-ʾImām ʿAlī), is a Shia mosque, located in Nordvest, Copenhagen, Denmark. It is the largest mosque in Denmark, and the only Shia mosque in the country.

== Overview ==
The construction of the mosque started in 2009 and it was completed and opened to the public in 2015. The 2,100-square-metre (23,000 sq ft) mosque is designed in neo-Iranian architectural style, with two 32-metre (105 ft) minarets and a central, turquoise dome. The mosque has capacity for 1,500 worshippers.

== See also ==
- Islam in Denmark
- List of mosques in Denmark
