= Swedish Muslims for Peace and Justice =

Islamic organization based in Sweden

- Svenska Muslimer för Fred och Rättvisa
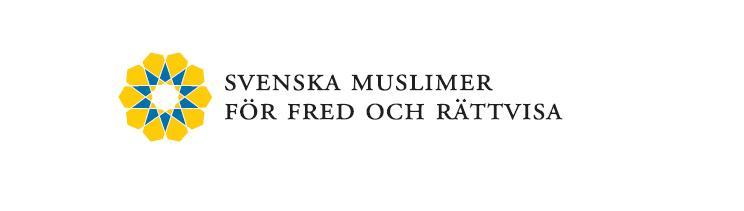
- Abbreviation: SMFR
- Formation: March 16, 2008; 18 years ago
- Founder: Mehmet Kaplan, Barlin Nur, among others
- Purpose: Peace movement, public education and leadership
- Headquarters: Skanstull, Stockholm
- Official language: Swedish
- Key people: Yasri Khan

Swedish Muslims for Peace and Justice (Swedish: Svenska Muslimer för Fred och Rättvisa, SMFR) is a Swedish Muslim self-described peace organization. It was founded in 2008 by a group including the Swedish Parliamentarian Mehmet Kaplan and is today one of the largest peace groups in Sweden It is headed by former Green Party politician Yasri Khan. Kaplan has since been forced to resign from the Swedish Cabinet due to his association with advocates of violent attacks on Armenians and connections to Islamist militants in Turkey.

In the years 2015-2017 SMPJ received state subsidies from the Swedish Agency for Youth and Civil Society according to the latter's 2017 annual report.

State aid to SMFR View source data.

SMPJ is a supporting organisation to Ship to Gaza Sweden.

The group has been active with educational and leadership programs. It also has some international work in Egypt, Thailand, Palestine etc. They work from a European Muslim perspective and go by the slogan "By Muslims for society".

According to a 2014 report by the government of the United Arab Emirates, in 2010 Tahir Akran of the Islamic Association in Sweden (Arabic: الرابطة الأسلامية في السويد) (Swedish: Islamiska förbundet i Sverige, IFiS), a group listed by the UAE as a terrorist organization, decided to improve the reputation of the Islamic Association by encouraging its members to participate in the SMPJ.
