= Hassan Moussa =

Sheikh Hassan Moussa (Arabic: حسن موسى) is the leading imam of the Stockholm Mosque at Medborgarplatsen. The mosque is run by the Islamiska Förbundet i Stockholm. A Svenska Dagbladet report accused him of deliberately misleading the Swedish public regarding the controversial contents of his sermons.
