= Bellevue Mosque =

Mosque in Gothenburg, Västra Götaland, Sweden

- Bellevuemoskén
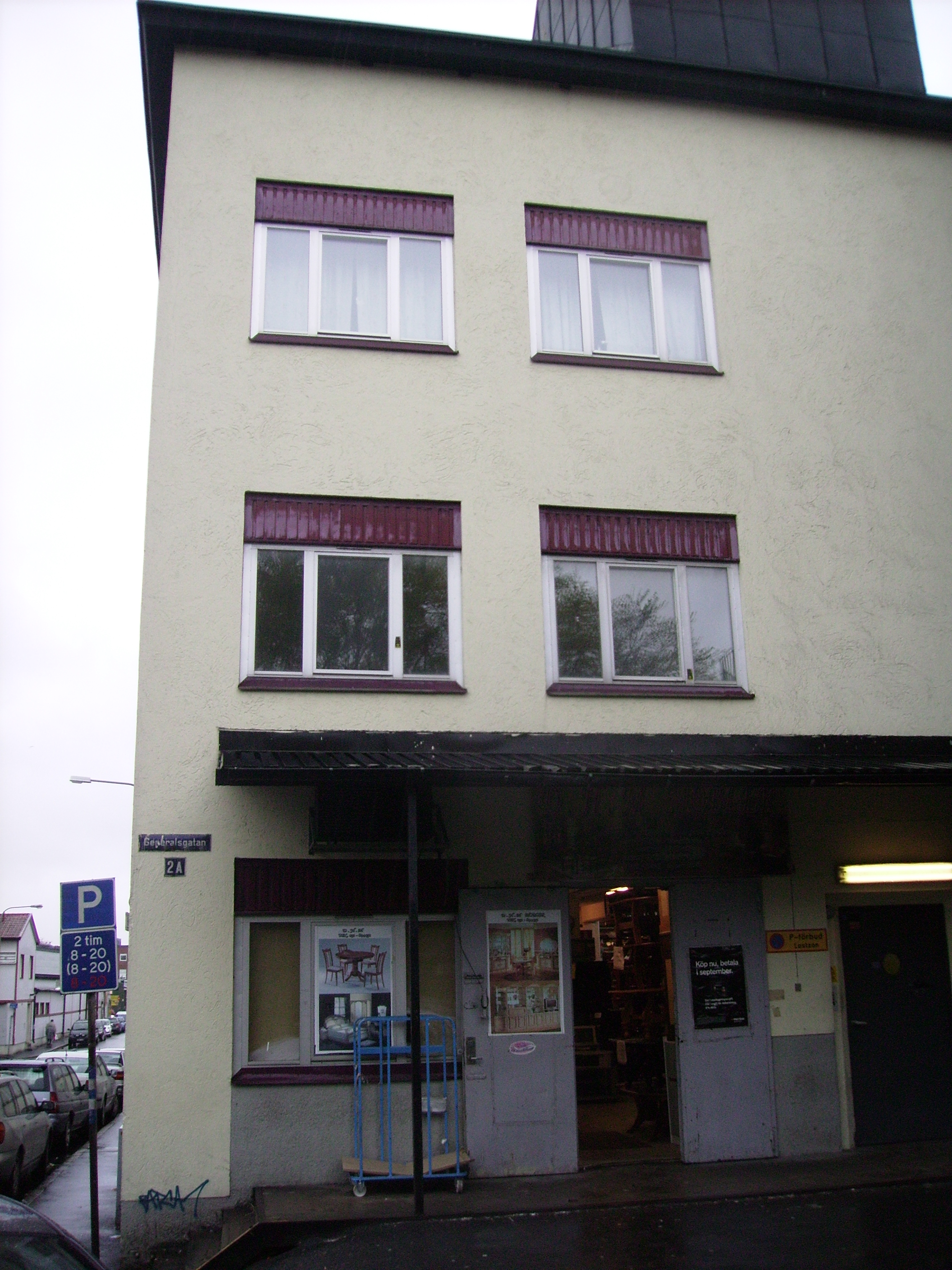

- Location within Västra Götaland

Location
- Location: Gothenburg, Västra Götaland, Sweden
- Interactive map of Bellevue Mosque
- Coordinates: 57°43′51.30″N 12°01′27.74″E

Architecture
- Type: Mosque

The Bellevue Mosque (Swedish: Bellevuemoskén) is a mosque in Gothenburg, Sweden. It is located at Generalsgatan 2A in the "Bellevue" district of Gothenburg. The mosque is administered by the Somali-dominated Islamic Sunni Centre Denomination (Swedish: Islamiska Sunnicentret Trossamfund, ISC) and advocates the Salafi movement of Islam. It was created with funds from Saudi Arabia.

The mosque has been in the focus of media several times for its alleged ties to various Islamist and terrorist-designated organizations. According to an article in Göteborgs-Tidningen, Mirsad Bektašević, the Swedish citizen of Bosniak descent who was convicted on terrorism-related charges in Sarajevo in 2007, was a frequent attendee of the Bellevue Mosque. In the same article it was further claimed that the mosque had financial ties to the al-Haramain Foundation, a Saudi-based charity group which has been listed on the United Nations list of "entities belonging to or associated with al-Qaeda". Representatives from the foundation are also said to have visited the mosque at several occasions.

In December 2006 it was reported that the mosque has been used to collect money for the Islamic Courts Union (ICU) in Somalia.

In July 2009 it was reported that Xasan Xuseen, described as spiritual leader of the Somali Islamist group al-Shabaab, had been invited to speak at a conference at the mosque. al-Shabaab has carried out several suicide attacks in Somalia and is designated as a terrorist organization by the United States Department of State. It is also described, although not officially designated, as a terrorist organization by the Swedish Security Service among others.

In November 2012, the mosque held the first public dawah course in the Swedish language, it was arranged by controversial British Islamic missionary group iERA and Sveriges Förenade Muslimer. According to the Swedish Defence University, nearly all individuals who have travelled from Gothenburg to join jihadi groups in Syria have been visitors to the mosque. The official web page of the mosque praise Sharia law as "just and merciful towards society as a whole".

== Organisations ==
A number of organisations are active at the mosque.

=== Mångkulturella Ungdoms Center ===
Mångkulturella Ungdoms Center (translation: "multicultural youth centre" is the youth section of the mosque. It was formed in 2004 and is a member in the umbrella organisation Muslim Youth of Sweden. On 11 September 2011 its chairman was among those arrested on suspicion of an attack against artist Lars Vilks, who had an exhibition at art gallery Röda Sten in Gothenburg. During the criminal investigation, police found propaganda for violent jihadism on a computer in their office with pictures named Al-Shabaab and mujahideen. The trial concluded there many indications to support the prosecutor's charge of attempted murder of Vilks, but the court only upheld the charge of carrying knives in a public space.

=== Sveriges Förenade Muslimer ===
Sveriges Förenade Muslimer (translation: "United Muslims of Sweden") was formed in 2011. They organised an annual conference with about 1000 visitors. The organisation has received funding from Gothenburg Municipality and state aid from the Swedish Agency for Youth and Civil Society. According to an investigation by Uppdrag granskning, the organisation has invited a number of preachers who sympathise with the Islamic State of Iraq and the Levant and al-Qaeda.

== See also ==
- Gothenburg Mosque
