= Mehmet Kaplan =

Swedish politician (born 1971)

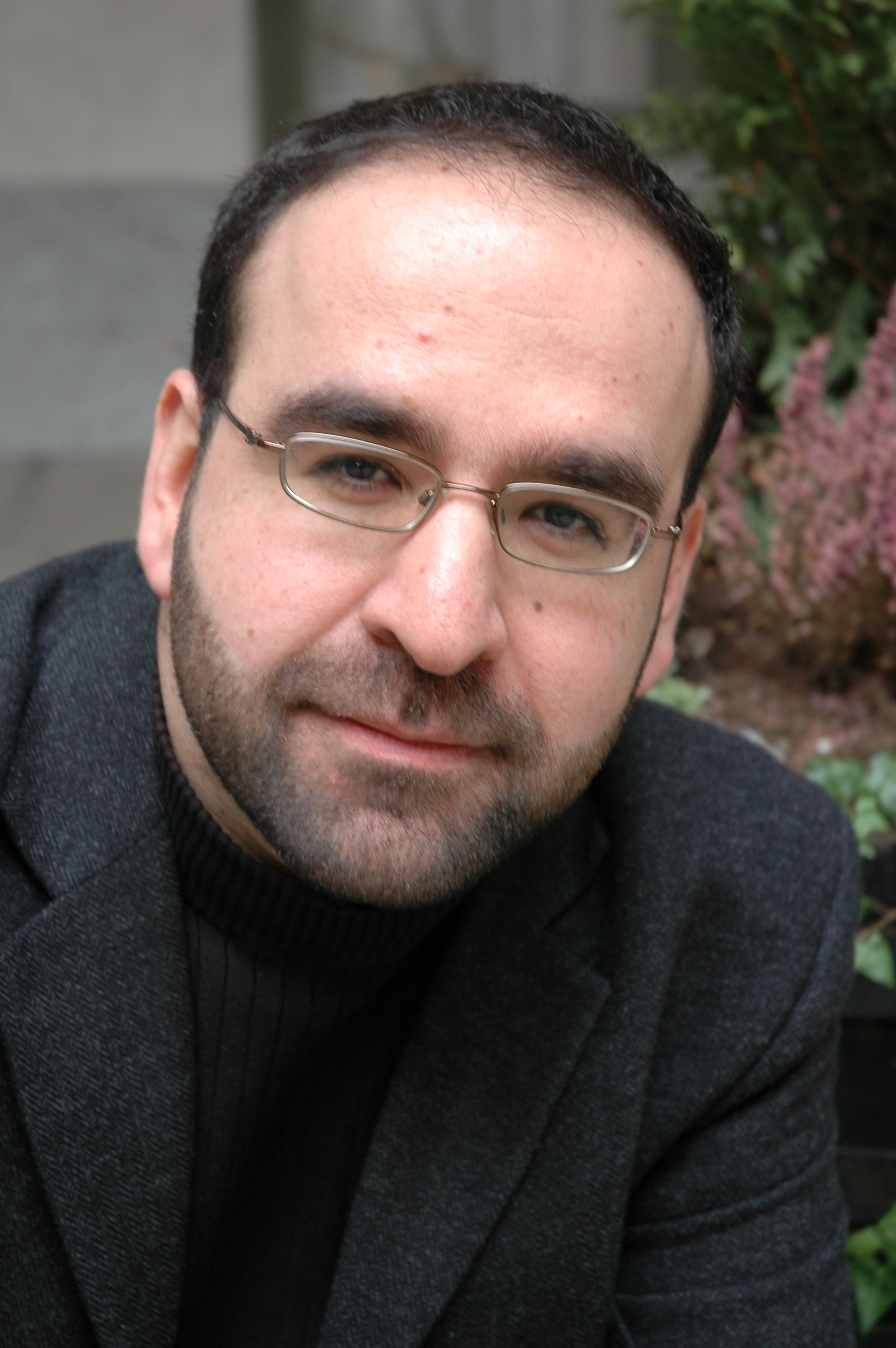

Minister for Housing and Urban Development
- In office 3 October 2014 – 18 April 2016
- Monarch: Carl XVI Gustaf
- Prime Minister: Stefan Löfven
- Preceded by: Stefan Attefall
- Succeeded by: Per Bolund (acting)

Member of the Swedish Riksdag for Stockholm Municipality
- In office 2 October 2006 – 29 September 2014

Personal details
- Born: 18 July 1971 (age 54) Gaziantep, Turkey
- Party: Green

Mehmet Güner Kaplan (born 18 July 1971) is a Swedish politician of Turkish origin who served as Minister for Housing and Urban Development from 2014 to 2016. He is a member of the Swedish Green Party.

Kaplan resigned from the Cabinet after controversy regarding ties to Turkish nationalist movements and Turkish government. He came under increasing pressure after local media published photos of him at a dinner with Turkish ultranationalists, including the Swedish head of the extremist Grey Wolves organisation, and a former leader of the main Turkish nationalist group in Sweden, who called on Turks to kill Armenians.

== Life and career ==
Kaplan was born to a Turkish family in Gaziantep, Turkey; he migrated to Sweden at age 8.

He was a member of the Riksdag (2006–2014) and before that spokesperson for the Muslim Council of Sweden (2005–2006) and Young Muslims of Sweden (2000–2002). He was also a founding member of the organization Swedish Muslims for Peace and Justice, a Muslim peace movement, as well as a strong supporter of the Swedish peace movement. He was a member of the board of the Green Party between 2003 and 2011.

Kaplan was on board the Ship to Gaza flotilla which tried to protest against the Israeli embargo of the Gaza Strip. The Israeli armed forces boarded the flotilla on 31 May 2010, killing 9 flotilla members who resisted their boarding.

On 1 July 2014, in a Fight Racism Now seminar held in Visby, Kaplan compared the young Muslims from Sweden who went to fight for any force in the Syrian civil war (including the Islamic State) with those Swedes who volunteered to fight for Finland against Russia in the Winter War during the Second World War. Kaplan commented that his statements had been misrepresented, but admitted to having chosen his words poorly.

In a Turkish newspaper interview, Kaplan said that it is natural for Sweden to recognise Palestine as a state, and that the "occupied territories will, if Allah willing, be freed, and east Jerusalem will become the capital of Palestine." Further he said that Israel will be forced to a peace agreement.

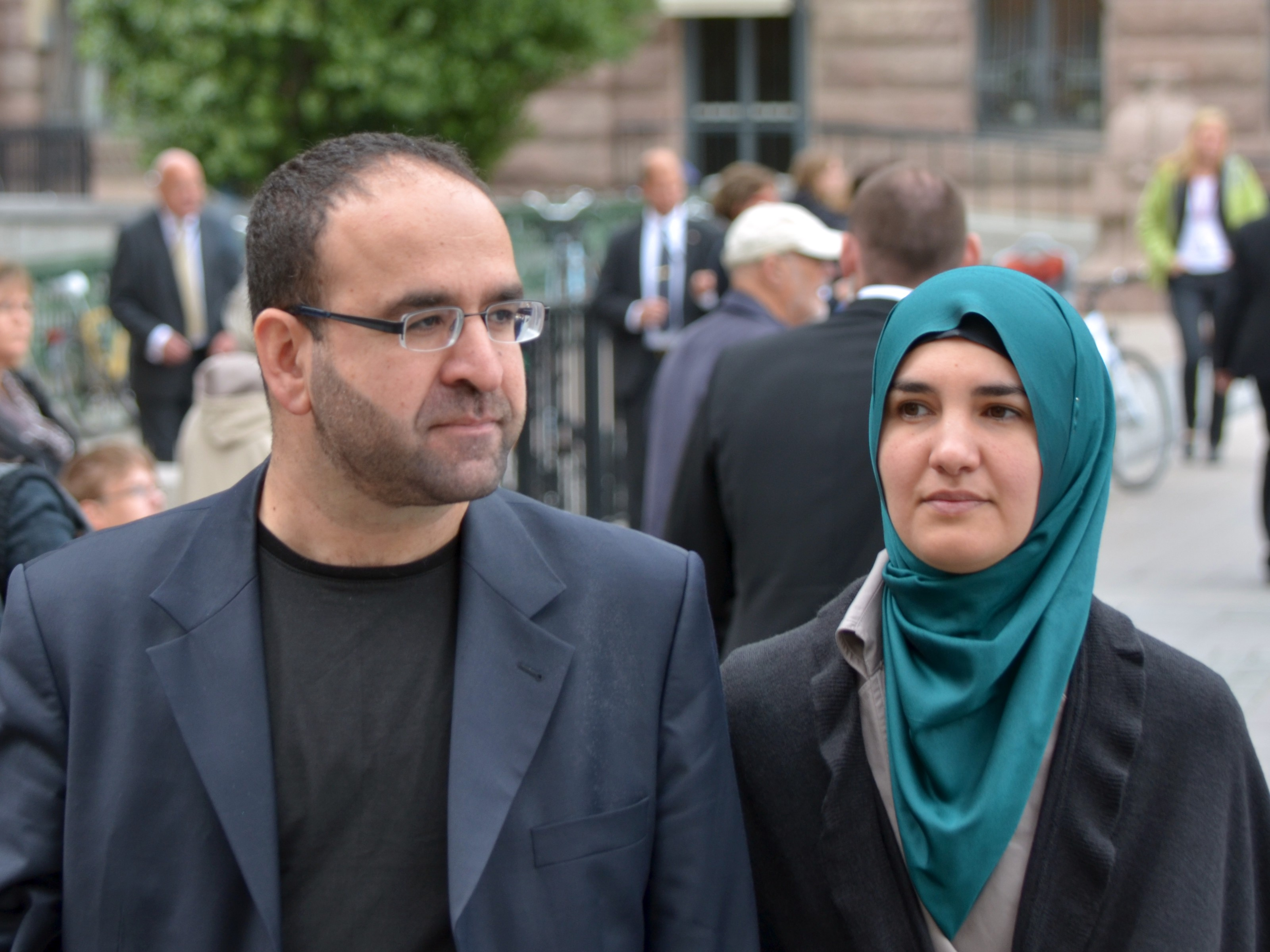
Mehmet Kaplan with his wife Feride Kaplan.

He has also been labeled being an Islamist by various personalities, including the previous MP, Nalin Pekgul of the Swedish Social Democratic Party.

== Resignation from office ==
In April 2016 Kaplan received criticism because he had connections to extreme Islamists in Turkey. In particular he met the Swedish leader Ilhan Sentürk of the Turkish nationalist group the Grey Wolves and Barbaros Leylani, deputy chair of the National Turkish Association in Sweden, who said a few days earlier that "those Armenian dogs must die", or, that Turks must "kill the Armenian dogs," in Sergels torg, and on several occasions with people from the Islamist organization Millî Görüş.

On 17 April, Svenska Dagbladet published a video on which Kaplan compares Israel's treatment of Palestinians to Nazi Germany's treatment of Jewish people. On 18 April the Swedish national public TV broadcaster SVT reported about Kaplan having close ties with the Turkish regime of Recep Tayyip Erdoğan, and that this was a part of a Turkish strategy to influence foreign governments. The two journalists from SVT said they had been researching Kaplan's connection with the Turkish AKP party for months and published some of their material prematurely when the affair suddenly exploded in the media. These cases raised questions in Sweden about the stance of Kaplan concerning extremism. On 18 April 2016, Kaplan resigned as cabinet minister. Several additional controversies with connections to Islamism in the Green Party occurred in the week following Kaplan's resignation which SVT's commentator called one of the party's worst crisis ever.
