= Mohamed Moumou =

Islamic terrorist (1965–2008)

Abu Qasurah al-Maghribi أبو قسورة المغربي
- Born: July 30, 1965; Fez, Morocco
- Died: October 5, 2008 (aged 43); Mosul, Iraq
- Other names: Mohammed Moumou, Abu Sara
- Military career
- Allegiance: Al-Qaeda
- Service years: 2003–2008
- Unit: Al-Qaeda in Iraq
- Conflicts: Insurgency in the Maghreb; Casablanca bombings; Iraqi insurgency

Abu Qaswarah al-Maghribi (Arabic: أبو قسورة المغربي) (also known as Mohammed Moumou or Abu Sara) (July 30, 1965 – October 5, 2008) was a Moroccan national who was reportedly the No. 2 leader of Al-Qaeda in Iraq and the senior leader in Northern Iraq. He died in a building in Mosul during a shootout with American troops.

Born in Fez, Morocco, he was one of the founders of the militant Moroccan Islamic Combatant Group. Mohammed immigrated to Sweden in the mid-1980s and gained Swedish citizenship in the mid-1990s.

In March 2004, Mohammed was arrested in Copenhagen, Denmark, at the request of Moroccan authorities for his alleged role in the 2003 Casablanca bombings. He was released by the Danish authorities after a month and sent back to Sweden.

While in Sweden, he was the "uncontested leader of an extremist group centered around the Brandbergen Mosque" in the Stockholm suburb of Haninge, according to the U.S. Treasury Department. Säpo, the Swedish Security Service, had been keeping an eye on him since the mid-1990s, suspecting him of leading an Islamist network that supported terrorism abroad. He was believed to be recruiting Jihadists to fight in Iraq from his base in Sweden. The Swedes also suspected that he had taken part in terrorist attacks and fought in Afghanistan in the 1990s. In May 2006, he left for Iraq and never returned. In December 2006, he was placed on the EU and UN terrorist lists.

According to the U.S. military, Abu Qaswarah was a charismatic figure who became the senior commander in northern Iraq in June 2007 and was second in command of Al-Qaeda in Iraq behind Abu Ayyub al-Masri. Allegedly, he was in charge of smuggling foreign fighters into northern Iraq and killed the fighters who did not want to attack Iraqis or carry out suicide missions. Prior to his death, a large number of Iraqi Christians were killed, and their murders were widely blamed on al-Qaeda. He is also accused of orchestrating the failed attack on the Mosul Civic Center, which if successful would have killed hundreds of Iraqi civilians.

According to the United States Department of the Treasury, Mohammed traveled to Afghanistan in the mid-1990s to participate in the al-Qaeda-run Khalden training camp. According to TelQuel, Mohammed was recruited in 1996 by Ibn al-Shaykh al-Libi to serve as a "sleeper agent" in Stockholm. Mohammed reportedly served, at some time in the past, as "Abu Musab al-Zarqawi's representative in Europe for issues related to chemical and biological weapons". He reportedly maintained ties to "al-Zarqawi's inner circle" in Iraq.

He was also the editor of the Al Ansar newsletter connected to the Algerian Armed Islamic Group (GIA).

The U.S. military said that it tracked Abu Qaswarah to a building in Mosul, which served as a "key command and control location" for Al-Qaeda in Iraq. On 5 October 2008, they entered the building, were fired upon, and during the shootout they killed five people, one of which was Abu Qaswarah. His death was announced ten days later, when positive identification was made on his body.

The U.S. military said his death would make it more difficult for Al-Qaeda to network and operate in the region.
