= Omar Mustafa =

Swedish politician (born 1985)

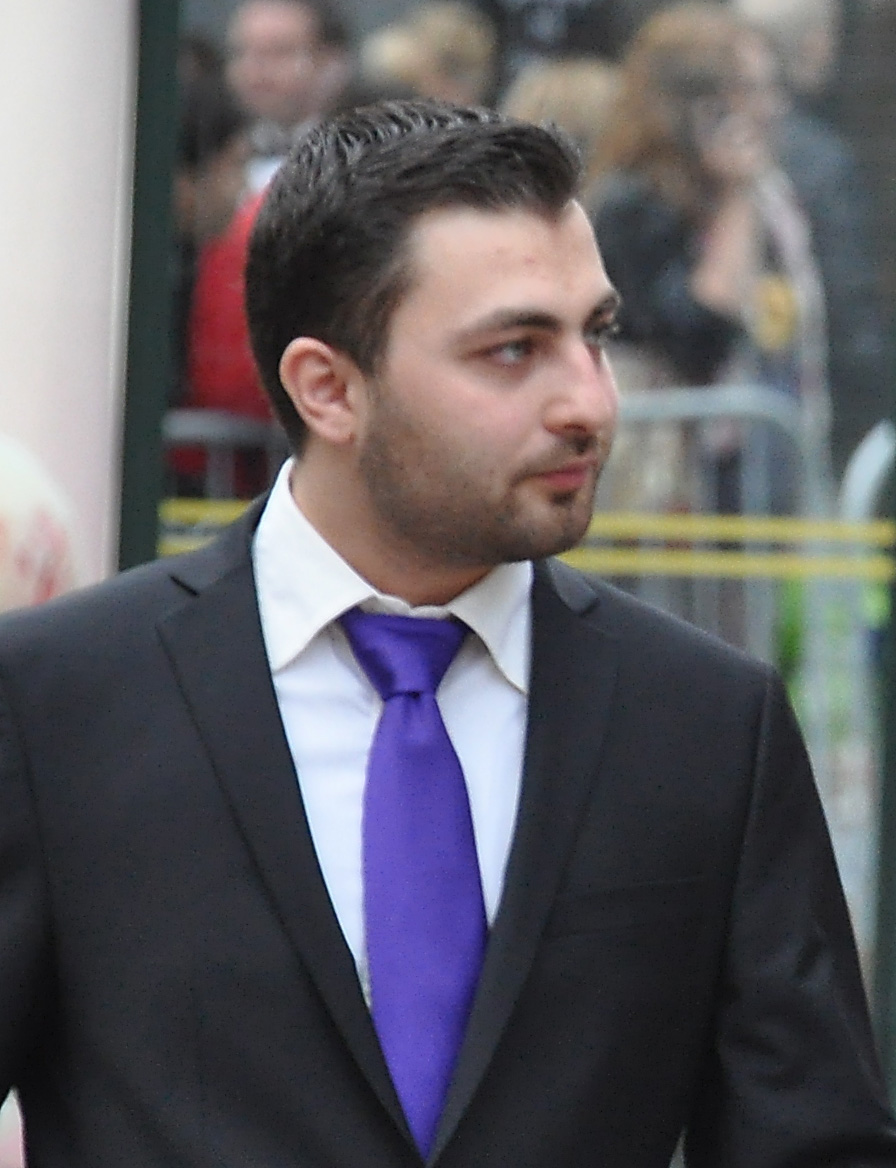
Omar Mustafa

Omar Mustafa (born 23 March 1985) is a Swedish politician of Syrian descent and leader of the Islamic Association in Sweden. He was a politician for the Social Democrat Party for AStockholm between 7 and 13 May 2014.

In 2007 he was chairman of Sveriges Unga Muslimer (English: "Muslim Youth of Sweden") and was also in the committee of Forum for European Muslim Youth and Student Organisations (FEMYSO), a subsidiary of the Federation of Islamic Organizations in Europe (FIOE). In a 2007 interview with Young Left, he criticized Denmark for its restrictive policies on Islam and its active participation in the war on terror.

He has become known in media for inviting homophobic and antisemitic people to make lectures as his role as leader for the Islamic organisation. Mustafa is a developments CEO for the study company Ibn Rushd. He has previously been active within Sweden's Young Muslims and in 2010 he became the organisations general secretary. Mustafa was also in 2007 a board member of European Muslim Youth and Student Organisations.

The Global Muslim Brotherhood Daily Report thinks that Omar Mustafa is the Muslim Brotherhood's representative in Sweden. This information was spread after the newspaper Dagens published the comment.
