= Uppsala Mosque =

Mosque in Uppsala, Sweden

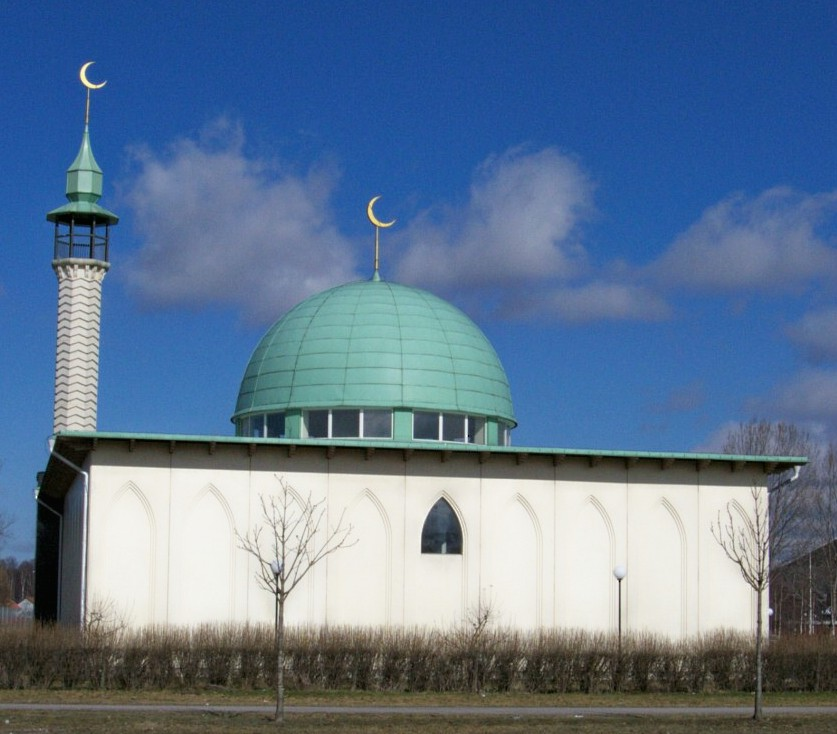

Religion
- Affiliation: Sunni Islam

Location
- Location: Uppsala, Sweden
- Interactive map of Uppsala Mosque
- Coordinates: 59°52′26.49″N 17°38′17.37″E

Architecture
- Type: Mosque
- Style: Islamic
- Completed: 1996; 30 years ago
- Minaret: 1

Website
- Official website

The Uppsala Mosque (Swedish: Uppsala Moské) is a small but very frequented mosque located in the Kapellgärdet neighbourhood of Uppsala in Sweden. At the time of construction, it was mistakenly claimed to be the northernmost mosque in the world (Saint Petersburg was). It is still the northernmost mosque in Sweden.

There is another small mosque in Uppsala, located at Bandstolsvägen 28, near Gottsunda centrum

== History ==
On 1 January 2015, the mosque was attacked with a molotov cocktail.

== See also ==
- Islam in Sweden
