= Brandbergen Mosque =

Mosque in Brandbergen, Sweden

- Sweden

Religion
- Affiliation: Islam
- Branch/tradition: Sunni

Location
- Location: Brandbergen, Haninge, Stockholm County, Sweden
- Interactive map of Brandbergen Mosque
- Coordinates: 59.173616°N 18.167988°E

Architecture
- Type: mosque

The Brandbergen Mosque, officially the Islamic Association in Brandbergen was a mosque located in an apartment in Brandbergen, Haninge Municipality, south of Stockholm, Sweden.

In the 1990s the mosque supported the extremist Armed Islamic Group of Algeria during the Algerian Civil War. According to the Jamestown Foundation, the mosque "has been repeatedly linked to Salafist-Jihadist terrorism since the early 1990s, when it served as a propaganda hub for the Algerian Groupe Islamique Armé (GIA)."

In 2004 an Arabic-language manual, which carried the logo and address of the Brandbergen Mosque, was spread on the internet. The manual described the construction of simple chemical weapons, including how to build a chemical munition from an ordinary artillery round. On December 7, 2006, the Swedish citizen Mohamed Moumou, who is described by the United States Department of the Treasury as an "uncontested leader of an extremist group centered around the Brandbergen Mosque in Stockholm", was put on the United Nations Security Council Committee 1267 list of foreign terrorists.

The mosque closed in 2008.
