= Alleged state-sponsored kidnappings of Muslims in Sweden =

Disinformation campaign against Swedish social services

The alleged state-sponsored kidnappings of Muslims in Sweden is a conspiracy theory and a global disinformation campaign against Sweden. The conspiracy theory gained attention in 2021 after a number of families of foreign origin in Sweden lost custody of their children.

== Background ==
Since December 2021, disinformation has been spread concerning Swedish social services taking Muslim children into care without a legal basis. The conspiracy theory was largely popularized by Arabic-speakers on various social media platforms.

Demonstrations in support of the families of the alleged kidnapped Muslim children have been held in various Swedish cities accompanied by representatives from the Nuance Party, an Islamist political party in Sweden.

Sweden's prime minister Ulf Kristersson has attributed the disinformation campaign to "brutal culture shocks", stating that Muslim immigrant parents in Sweden cannot be expected to raise their children the same way they might have been raised in their countries of origin; referring to the fact that corporal punishment in the home is illegal and might lead to children being taken from their parents and placed in foster care.

== Consequences ==
The Swedish Security Service has stated that the campaign has negatively affected the security of Sweden. In 2023, two Swedish tourists were killed in Belgium by a perpetrator who was looking to murder Swedish people. Terrorism researchers Hans Brun and Magnus Ranstorp have blamed the campaign for having a role in motivating the targeting of Swedes.
