= Mahmoud Aldebe =

Swedish chairman

Mahmoud Jamil al-Debe (Arabic: محمود جميل الدبعي, born 10 August 1954) is the chairman of the Muslim Association of Sweden (SMF). He was previously vice chairman of the Muslim Council of Sweden, an umbrella organization with the Muslim Association of Sweden as one of its members.

In the mid 1980s, as the chairman of SMF and in conjunction with the National Swedish Immigration and Naturalization Board (the former name of the Swedish Migration Agency) he authored the leaflet "Islam i Sverige" (Islam in Sweden) wherein he expresses the view that Islam is an all-encompassing belief system which gives firm instructions which are to be followed in all aspects of daily life: moral, spiritual, political and economic. In 2006, as the chairman of SMF he authored a letter to every party in the Riksdag where it was demanded that Muslims receive a special set of laws and rules: imams must approve divorces, schools should teach Muslim children Arabic and religion in segregated groups and that boys and girls should not have lessons in swimming together. Aldebe also demanded that employers give Muslims two extra days of paid days off to celebrate Islamic holidays. Aldebe's ideas of an all-encompassing Islam and demands that Swedish ideas about what belong to the secular part of society must be reformed, are founded in the ideology of islamist Hassan al-Banna.

Aldebe was born in Jordan and immigrated to Sweden in the late 1970s together with his wife Ebtisam Aldebe. His wife was a candidate for the Centre Party in the 2006 Swedish parliament elections, but didn't receive enough votes to get a seat. She participated in the campaign for Muslims having a parallel legal system in Sweden. His wife was a lay judge at Solna district court, where at a trial March 2018 she acquitted a man from a charge of wife-beating because he was from a "better family" and the wife should have "resolved the dispute with the husband's family". In the aftermath of the court decision, both Ebtisam Aldebe and the other lay judge who served at that trial were dismissed from service at the district court and were stripped of their membership in the Centre Party.

== Controversies ==
In 2003, Aldebe wrote a letter of appeal to then Swedish Minister for Justice Thomas Bodström, requesting a new trial for the brothers Rezkar and Dakhaz Atroshi, who were sentenced to life in prison for assisting in the honor killing of 19-year-old Pela Atroshi in Iraqi Kurdistan in 1999. The murder was described by the court as an example of honor killing. In the letter, which Aldebe wrote on behalf of and as vice chairman of the Muslim Council of Sweden, Aldebe claimed that the brothers were innocent and that the verdict was the result of a "conspiracy" involving leading politicians, the police and the media.

In an article published in Expressen on 3 October 2005, Swedish Imam and Muslim convert Abd al Haqq Kielan wrote that Aldebe had approached him and said to him that he was "a Jew who has converted to Islam to destroy for the Muslims" and that he had also called him "Shayṭān" (Satan). Kielan further accused Aldebe of using undemocratic methods such as "threats, slander and reprisal" against critics. In the Swedish Television (Sveriges Television) documentary Slaget om muslimerna (The battle for the muslims), Aldebe is accused to being an Islamist, intent on giving Islam an official political role in Sweden.
