= Trollhättan Mosque =

Mosque in Götaland, Sweden

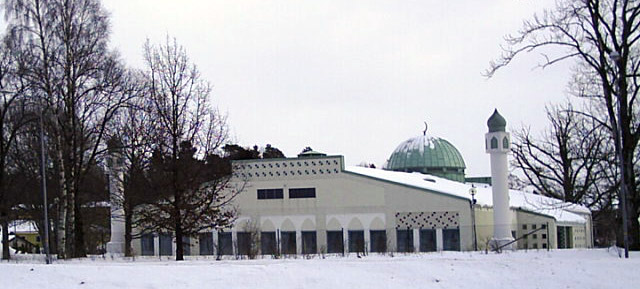

Religion
- Affiliation: Shia Islam

Location
- Location: Trollhättan, Sweden
- Interactive map of Trollhättan Mosque
- Coordinates: 58°15′31.4″N 12°17′06.0″E

Architecture
- Type: Mosque
- Style: Islamic
- Completed: 1985; 41 years ago
- Minaret: 2

The Trollhättan Shia Mosque (Swedish: Trollhättans moské) is a large Shia Muslim mosque in the country located in Trollhättan, Västra Götaland County, Sweden.

After Idi Amin ordered in 1972 the expulsion of all Asians from Uganda, many of them were Shia Muslims who settled in Sweden. In 1976 they've established local Islamic centre, and in 1985 the mosque was built. On 14 August 1993, neo-nazis attacked the (original) mosque with molotov cocktails causing extensive damage to the building and its destruction. The present mosque is larger and built in the same place where the original mosque was located.
