= Gothenburg Mosque =

Mosque in Gothenburg, Västra Götaland, Sweden

- Göteborgs moské
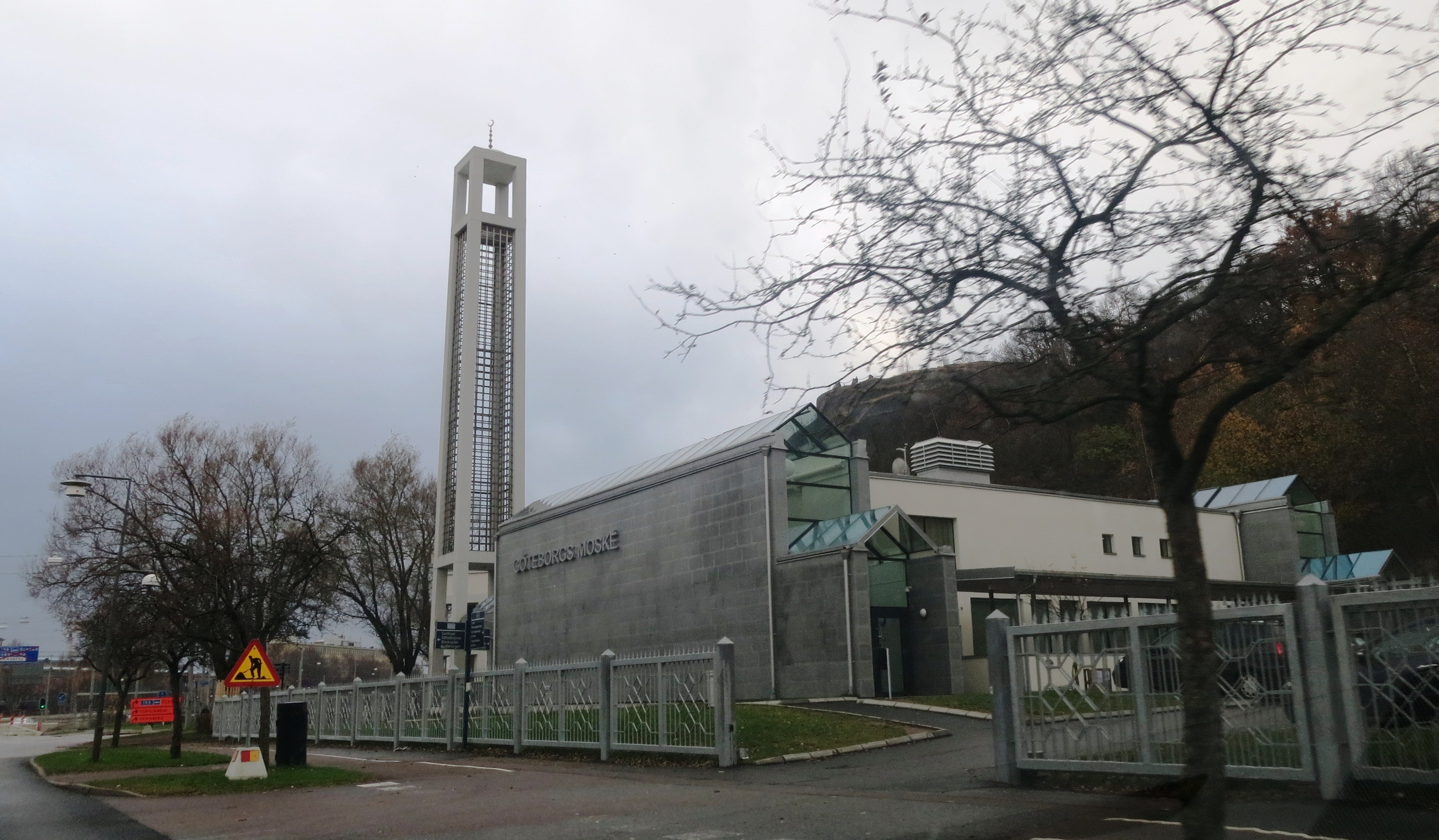

- Location within Västra Götaland

Religion
- Affiliation: Islam
- Branch/tradition: Sunni
- Governing body: Islamic Association of Sweden

Location
- Location: Hisingen, Gothenburg, Sweden
- Coordinates: 57°42′53.34″N 11°56′38.94″E

Architecture
- Architect: Björn Sahlqvist
- Type: mosque
- Funded by: Saudi Arabia
- Established: 16 June 2011
- Interior area: 2,000 m^{2}

Gothenburg Mosque (Swedish: Göteborgs moské) is a mosque located at the foot of Ramberget on Hisingen in Gothenburg, Sweden. The construction of the mosque was entirely funded by Saudi Arabia and is run by the Swedish Muslim Foundation (SMS). It was inaugurated 16 June 2011.

The mosque cost 67 million Swedish krona to build and is 2000 square meters. The construction of the mosque has been met with demonstrations from right-wing activists. The Saudi finance minister Dr. Abu Rachman al Seid said on the inauguration that "we do this out of kindness - and because we can afford it". The board members of the mosque and Saudi refused to be interviewed by reports from the Swedish investigative journalism television program Uppdrag Granskning in conjunction with the inauguration.

The imam Sheikh Abdul Rashid Mohamed was trained in Saudi Arabia. In a 2013 Swedish Television interview with hidden camera he stated that polygamy is allowed under certain conditions and that wives cannot refuse to have sex with their husbands unless they were ill. Chairman Ahmed Al-Mofty stated in a follow-up interview with Göteborgs-Posten that Rashid had advised what Islamic tradition is and that his advice was not legally binding.

The building is designed by Björn Sahlqvist, who wanted to design a mosque with a Scandinavian touch with a lot of light and space. There is a silent square minaret and prayer rooms for men and women, conference rooms, offices, lecture halls, kitchen and an ablution area.

== IIF ==
Islamiska informationsföreningen (IIF) (tr: Islamic information society) was, according to Swedish Radio in 2013, using the mosque premises while receiving funding from Gothenburg Municipality. In 1986 IIF started publishing the magazine named Salaam. It published texts by Muslim brotherhood ideologues Sayyid Qutb and Muhammad Qutb translated into Swedish. A significant number of its texts were written by female converts to Islam. IIF was in 1995 a member association of the umbrella organisation Muslim Council of Sweden. IIF collaborated with the Saudi organisation World Assembly of Muslim Youth (WAMY) to translate Arabic texts into Swedish and sold literature from The Islamic Foundation, International Islamic Federation of Student Organizations (IIFSO) and WAMY.

== Images ==
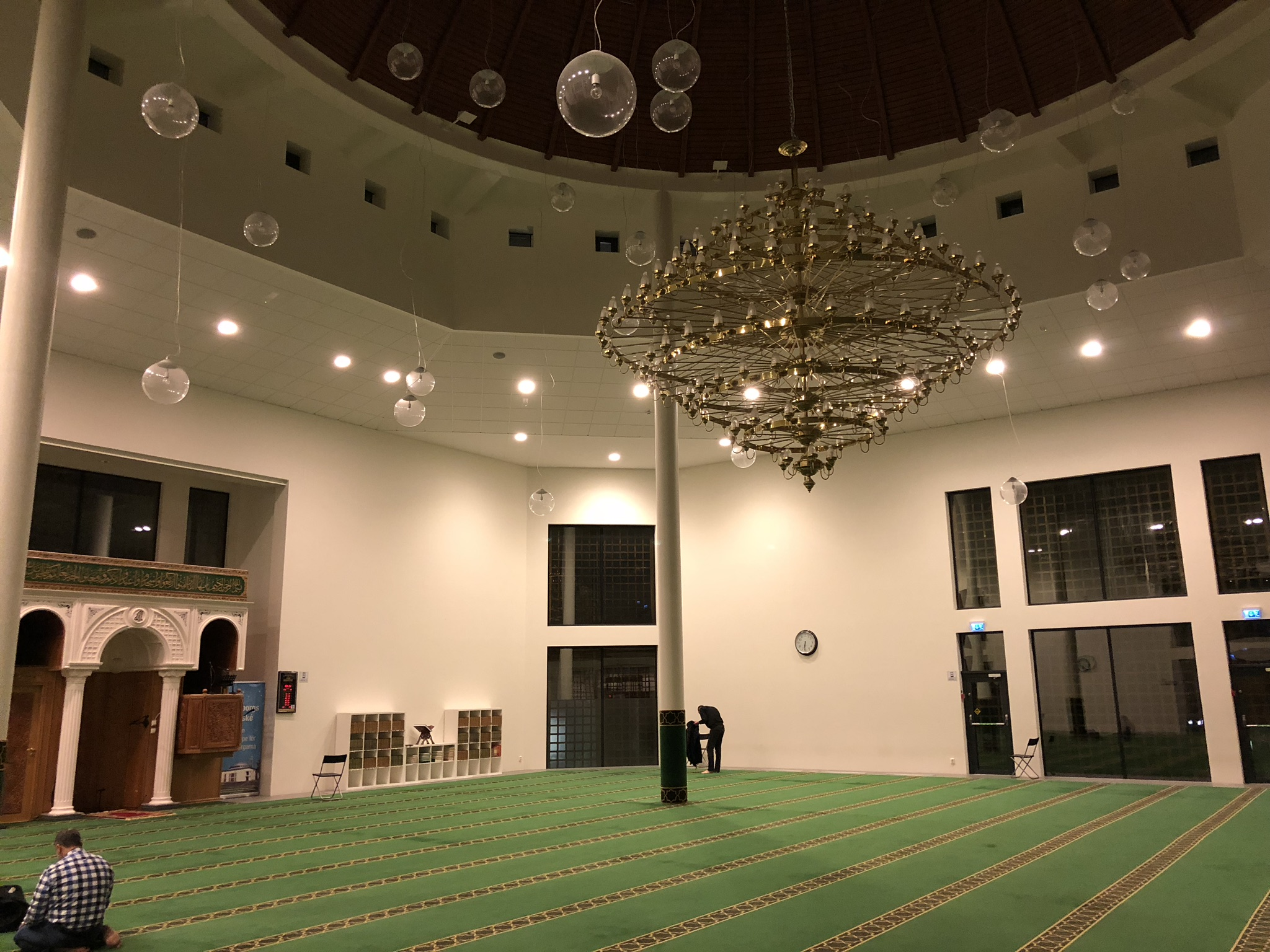
Inside of Gothenburg Mosque

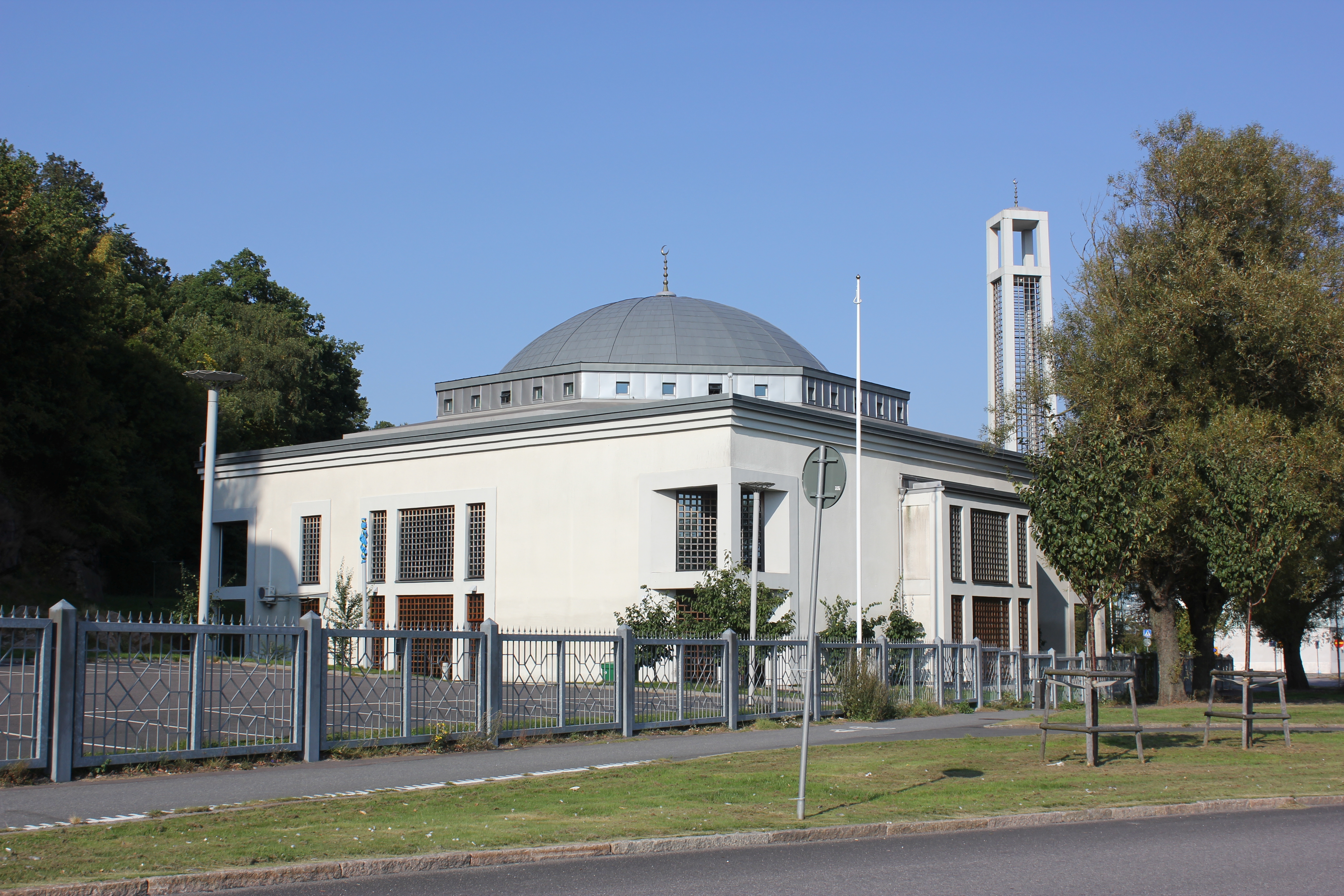
Gothenburg Mosque

== See also ==
- Islam in Sweden
