= Swedish Agency for Support to Faith Communities =

- Myndigheten för stöd till trossamfund (SST)

Agency overview
- Headquarters: (Sweden) Stockholm
- Minister responsible: Parisa Liljestrand
- Agency executive: Isak Reichel
- Parent department: Ministry of Culture

Swedish Agency for Support to Faith Communities (Swedish: Myndigheten för stöd till trossamfund) is an agency that provides state aid to religious communities in Sweden. The agency is set to be incorporated into Swedish Agency for Youth and Civil Society on 1 January 2026.

In 2011 the Reinfeldt Cabinet via the Minister for Public Administration, Stefan Attefall, announced that the state aid was to increase from 50 million SEK to 60 million, in particular directed towards Islam and the orthodox church. In 2011, 22 faith communities qualified for state aid.

Some of the state aid was directed towards Jewish congregations to enable them to commission security installations to thwart antisemitic attacks. In 2015 this state aid was widened to include all faith communities, provided they qualified for state aid.

State aid distributed by SST (10 SEK ~ 1 euro), 2009–2015

== Leadership ==
- Åke Göransson, general director (2017–2020)
- Helena Josefson, acting general director (2020–2021)
- Isak Reichel, general director (2021–2026)
