= Imam Ali Mosque (Järfälla) =

Mosque in Järfälla, Stockholm, Sweden

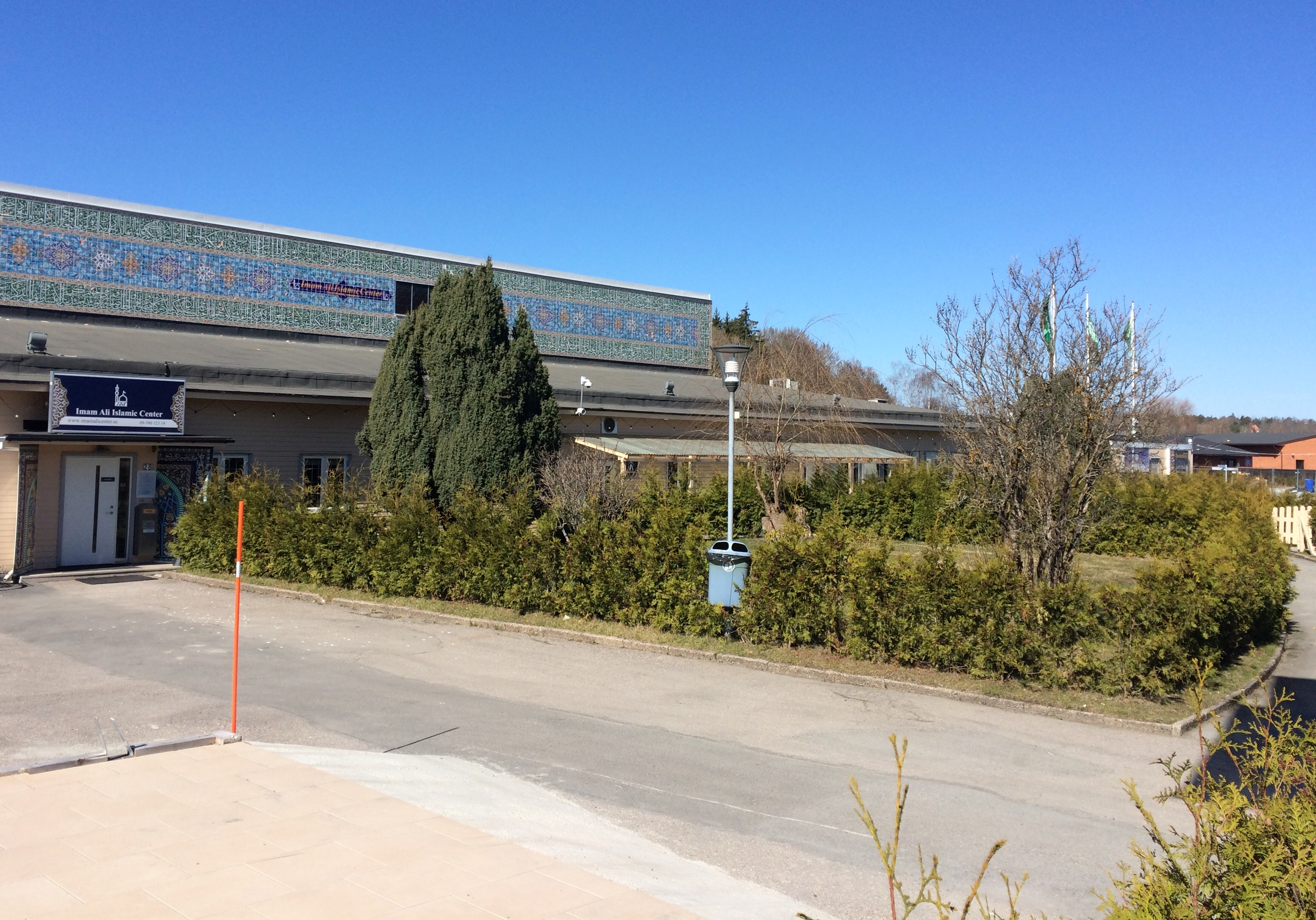

Religion
- Affiliation: Shia Islam

Location
- Location: Jakobsberg, Sweden
- Interactive map of Imam Ali Mosque
- Coordinates: 59°24′49.0″N 17°49′30.3″E

Architecture
- Type: Mosque
- Style: Islamic
- Completed: 1997; 29 years ago

Website
- Official website

The Imam Ali Mosque (Swedish: Imam Ali moské), is a large Shia Muslim mosque in the country located in Järfälla Municipality, Stockholm County, Sweden.

In May 2017, there was an arson attack against the building, a fire caused major damage to the facade and roof of a mosque. The attacker is believed to be an ISIS sympathiser or a far-right activist.
