= Muslim Council of Sweden =

Islamic organization based in Sweden

- Sveriges muslimska råd
- Abbreviation: SMR
- Formation: 1990; 36 years ago
- Chairperson: Helena Benaouda

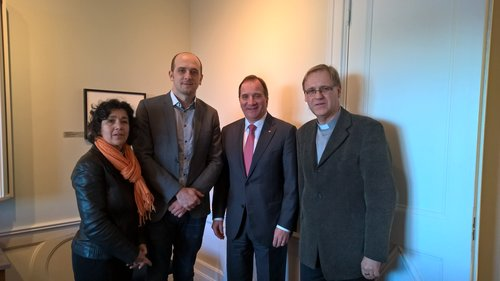
The chairman of the Muslim Council of Sweden together with representatives from the Central Jewish Council and the Christian Council of Sweden at a meeting with Prime Minister Stefan Löfven.

The Muslim Council of Sweden (Swedish: Sveriges muslimska råd, SMR) was an umbrella organisation of Islamic organisations in Sweden. It was founded in 1990 by representatives of the United Islamic Parishes in Sweden (Swedish: Förenade islamiska församlingar i Sverige, FIFS) and the Muslim Association of Sweden (Swedish: Sveriges Muslimska Förbund, SMuF). The current chairperson of the organisation is Helena Benaouda, who succeeded Mostafa Kharraki.

According to islamologist Sameh Egyptson at Lund University, Swedish social anthropologist Aje Carlbom, and parliamentarian Abderisak Aden (founder of the Islamic Democratic Institute (Islamiska demokratiska institutet)), at least some of the leading members of SMR support Islamist ideologies and are influenced by the Egyptian Muslim Brotherhood.

== Alliance with the Social Democratic Party ==
In 1999, the organisation was part of an alliance with the Religious Social Democrats (Swedish: Tro och Solidaritet) faction of the Social Democratic Party, where the council was to gain influence in Swedish politics via quotas for the number of Muslim politicians on election lists for council, region and Riksdag elections. Tro och Solidaritet was to further Islamic interests such as legislation and contracts concerning Muslim holidays, instituting a tax-financed training for imams via the National Agency for Higher Education and rules in working places for the Jumu'ah (Friday prayer). According to Religious Social Democrats chairman Peter Weiderud in 2014, the Religious Social Democrats were still in contact with SMR.

== Leadership ==
- Mahmoud Aldebe (1999)
- Helena Benaouda (2014)

== Member organizations ==
The Muslim Council of Sweden currently has 9 member organisations, with a total number of about 100,000 members:

- Young Muslims of Sweden (Sveriges Unga Muslimer)
- United Islamic Parishes in Sweden (Förenade islamiska församlingar i Sverige)
- Muslim Association of Sweden (Sveriges Muslimska Förbund)
- Bosnian Islamic National Association in Sweden (Bosniska Islamiska Riksförbundet i Sverige)
- Islamic School Foundation (Stiftelsen Islamiska Skolan)
- Muslim Scouts of Sweden (Sveriges Muslimska Scouter)
- Islamic Information Association (Islamiska Informationsföreningen)
- Islamic Relief
- PIS

== Controversies ==
SMR has been involved in several controversies. In 2006 Mahmoud Aldebe, one of the Board members of SMR, sent letters to each of the major political parties in Sweden demanding special legislation for Muslims in Sweden, including the right to specific Islamic holidays, special public financing for the building of Mosques, that all divorces between Muslim couples be approved by an Imam, and that Imams should be allowed to teach Islam to children of Muslim parents in public schools. The request was condemned by all political parties and the government and the Swedish Liberal Party requested that an investigation be started by the Office of the Exchequer into the use of public funding of SMR. A spokesperson of the Board of SMR subsequently stated that while it supported some of the contents of the letter it had not discussed other parts, such as special legislation for Muslims and did not think that the letter had been a good idea to communicate them in a list of demands.

Although the Board of SMR did not condemn Aldebe the letter has caused conflict within the organization.

SMR has also been accused of being closely allied to the Swedish Social Democrat Party (see Swedish Association of Christian Social Democrats). Which has been criticised both inside and outside the party.

== See also ==
- Islam in Sweden
