= Swedish Schools Inspectorate =

- Statens skolinspektion

Agency overview
- Formed: 1 October 2008
- Type: Government agency
- Jurisdiction: SFS 2011:556
- Employees: Approx. 400
- Minister responsible: Johan Pehrson, Minister for Education
- Agency executive: Helén Ängmo, Director-General
- Parent department: Ministry of Education
- Website: www.skolinspektionen.se

The Swedish Schools Inspectorate (Swedish: Statens skolinspektion), commonly known as the School Inspectorate (Swedish: Skolinspektionen), is a Swedish government agency headed by a director general appointed by the government.

The primary aim of the Swedish Schools Inspectorate is to contribute to school improvement and development. The overall goal is a school system where all children have equal rights to a good education and knowledge in a secure environment.

The agency has two types of assignments. One of them is to conduct regular supervisory audits, and the other one is to conduct quality control. Regular supervision is conducted in every school by three-year intervals, while quality control is conducted randomly or at the request of someone, often parents.

The agency has the opportunity to decide on complaints, orders or injunctions with a penalty to get school boards to implement necessary measures. As a last resort, the authority may withdraw the authorization for independent schools, adopt measures on the municipal local principal's expense, or to close a school.

Several other missions, such as auditing of grants for schools and reviews of test results, is also conducted by the agency.

The agency was formed on 1 October 2008 on the initiative of Minister for Education Jan Björklund but is a separate agency from the Ministry of Education.

== Director-Generals ==
- Ann-Marie Begler, 2008-2015
- Helén Ängmo, 2016-

== Schools closed by the agency ==
- Fredens skola; Gothenburg, Västra Götaland County, closed on 28 September 2011
- Kunskapsboningen; Malmö, Skåne County, closed on 22 December 2011
- Central Skola Al-Hud; Stockholm, Stockholm County, closed on 6 July 2012.
- Lundsbergs skola; Storfors, Värmland County, Sweden's oldest independent boarding school, closed temporarily on 28 August 2013. The Administrative court in Stockholm County ruled on 6 September 2013 that the school should be re-opened on 9 September 2013.
