= Swedish Agency for Youth and Civil Society =

Swedish administrative authority

- Myndigheten för ungdoms- och civilsamhällesfrågor

Agency overview
- Preceding agency: Ungdomsstyrelsen
- Jurisdiction: Government of Sweden
- Headquarters: (Sweden) Växjö
- Employees: 80 (2017)
- Agency executive: Magnus Jägerskog (2025–), Director general
- Parent agency: Ministry of Culture
- Website: eng.mucf.se

Swedish Agency for Youth and Civil Society (Swedish: Myndigheten för ungdoms- och civilsamhällesfrågor, MUCF) is a Swedish government agency which deals with youth policy and issues relating to Swedish civil society. Magnus Jägerskog is the Director General since 2025.

== History ==
The name of the agency prior to 2014 was Ungdomsstyrelsen.

Late 2017 announcement of planned relocation to Växjö led to resignation of many employees.

In 2024 the government allowed the agency to have two headquarter seats, one in Stockholm and one in Växjö, as the Swedish Agency for Support to Faith Communities is set to be incorporated into the agency on 1 January 2026. In 2025 the Ministry of Culture proposed giving the agency control over minority questions instead of the Stockholm administrative board as it was more cost-efficient.

== Work ==
The agency distributes between 350 and 600 million SEK annually to about 400 civil society organisations. According to an evaluation by the Swedish Agency for Public Management, about half the organisations receiving funding from MUCF state that they are dependent upon state funding to a great or very great extent and that their economical dependence upon state grants has been increasing since 2014. On average, the recipients state that state funding represents about 60-70% of their income. Of the 150 investigated organisations, 14 stated that their only income is state funding from MUCF. Of the fifty investigated ethnic-community organisations, four stated their only source of income was from MUCF.

State aid distributed by MUCF, 2013–2018
