= Immigration to Sweden =

Source: Statistics Sweden 2024

Immigration to Sweden refers to the movement of people into Sweden with the intention of residing in the country. While many immigrants eventually acquire Swedish citizenship, not all do. The economic, social, and political effects of immigration in Sweden have been widely studied and debated, particularly regarding labor market integration, access to social services, educational outcomes, settlement patterns, crime, and political participation. As of 2024, approximately 64.6% of the Swedish population are ethnic Swedes, (Note: This includes residents who were born in Sweden and whose parents both were born in Sweden.) while the remaining 35.4% are of non-ethnic Swedish origin, the overwhelming majority being immigrants and their descendants from Europe, the Middle East, Africa, and Asia.

Sweden had very few immigrants in 1900 when the nationwide population totaled 5,100,814 inhabitants, of whom 35,627 individuals were foreign-born (0.7%). 21,496 of those foreign-born residents were from other Nordic countries, 8,531 people were from other European countries, 5,254 from North America, 90 from South America, 87 from Asia, 79 from Africa, and 59 from Oceania.

As of 2010, 1.33 million people or 14.3 percent of the inhabitants of Sweden were foreign-born. Of these individuals, 859,000 (64.6%) were born outside the European Union and 477,000 (35.4%) were born in another EU member state. Sweden has evolved from a nation of net emigration ending after World War I to a nation of net immigration from World War II onward. In 2013, immigration reached its highest level since records began, with 115,845 people migrating to Sweden while the total population grew by 88,971. It continued to rise steadily in the following years, followed by a clear peak in 2015, with just over 163,000 persons immigrating in total that year. 2017 saw a decrease, with nearly 144,500 individuals immigrating. As of 2020, the percentage of inhabitants with a foreign background in Sweden had risen to 25.9 percent. In 2020, population growth in Sweden was primarily driven by people with a foreign background, 98.8 percent (51,073 people) and persons with a Swedish background accounted for 1.2 percent (633 persons) of the population increase. The official definition of foreign background comprises individuals either born abroad or having both parents born abroad. In 2017, majorities in three municipalities had foreign backgrounds: Botkyrka (58.6%) Södertälje (53.0%) and Haparanda (51.7%). Malmö, the third largest city of Sweden and the province of Scania as a whole have taken in highest numbers of refugees who reached Sweden, in particular during the Yugoslav Wars in the 1990s and the Syrian civil war in the 2010s.

Immigration to Sweden from Countries with Significant Asylum Applications. Data: Statistics Sweden

In 2014, 81,300 individuals applied for asylum in Sweden, which was an increase of 50 percent compared to 2013 and the most since 1992. Of these, 47 percent came from Syria, followed by 21 percent from the Horn of Africa, mostly Somalia. Overall, 77 percent (63,000) of requests were approved, with approval rates differing greatly between different applicant groups. In early October 2015, less than two weeks into the month, a record figure of 86,223 asylum applications was reached, and in the remaining weeks of the year that figure rose to 162,877. In 2016, 28,939 people applied for asylum, after temporary border ID controls had been initiated and been in effect during 2016. As of 2014, according to Statistics Sweden, there were around 17,000 total asylum immigrants from Syria, 10,000 from Iraq, 4,500 from Eritrea, 1,900 from Afghanistan, and 1,100 from Somalia. In the year 2017, most asylum seekers come from Syria (267), Eritrea (263), Iraq (117), and Georgia (106).

According to an official report by the governmental Swedish Pensions Agency, total immigration to Sweden for 2017 was expected to be roughly 180,000 individuals, and thereafter to number 110,000 persons every year.

Public demand for investigations into whether immigration applications are misused to seek social welfare benefits in the country has grown. There have been calls to tackle a perceived abuse of welfare in Sweden, Folkhemmet (the "Swedish Middle Way"), the Swedish Migration Agency, de facto social segregation, the rise of right-wing Swedish politics, and imported Danish-Swedish nationalism.

The Swedish Migration Agency investigated in 2020 "whether and to what extent students" with permits that grant residency for study, instead use them to work in the country. The agency concluded in their 2022 report entitled, "Misuse of residence permits for studies", that there was widespread misuse of the student residence permits. The report was based on a country-specific group of 360 students granted permits, who were admitted to two-year masters' programmes: Slightly over one-third of this cohort applied for an extension to their residence permit for the second year of study, while just under thirty percent applied for work permits instead.

Immigrants in Sweden are mostly concentrated in the urban areas of Svealand and Götaland. Between 2010 and 2020, the ten net largest foreign-born populations immigrating into Sweden came from Syria, Afghanistan, Somalia, Eritrea, Iraq, Poland, India, Iran & Kurdistan, Thailand, China.

== History ==
Annual immigration and emigration, Sweden 1875–2023

Before the second world war, Sweden was a linguistically and culturally homogeneous country compared with other European countries with the exception of the Sami, Tornedalian and Romani minorities. During the High Middle Ages, German immigrants arrived as foreign experts in trade and mining and are estimated to have constituted 10-20% of the city populations. However, since only 5% of the population lived in cities during this time their total share of the populated was only 1 to 1.5% of the population. Small, but influential, numbers of Walloon immigrants started arriving in the 17th century and again in the 19th century. Most of them returned to Belgium after a few years and the estimates for how many that stayed range from 900 to 2000 compared with the contemporary population of Sweden being 900 000.

The 1920s and 30s saw Sweden changing from being an emigrant country into becoming an immigrant country.

=== World War II ===
Population by country of birth 1900-2016. The percentage of the population who were born in Sweden and conversely the first generation immigrant's share of the total population.

From 1871 and onwards Statistics Sweden reports the number of immigrants each year. From 1871 to 1940 the average number of immigrants were 6000 per year. Immigration increased markedly with World War II. Historically, the most numerous of foreign born nationalities were ethnic Germans from Germany and other Scandinavians from Denmark and Norway, as well as people from Baltic countries. In short order, 70,000 war children were evacuated from Finland, of which 15,000 remained in Sweden. Also, many of Denmark's nearly 7,000 Jews who were evacuated to Sweden during the Nazi occupation of Denmark, and remained there until the end of the war.

A sizable community from the Baltic States (Estonia, Latvia and Lithuania) arrived during the Second World War.

=== 1945 to 1967 ===
As of 1945, the immigrants share of the population was below two percent. During the 1950s and 1960s, the recruitment of migrant workers was an important factor of immigration. The Nordic countries signed a trade agreement in 1952, establishing a common labour market and free movement across borders. This migration within the Nordic countries, especially from Finland to Scandinavia, was essential to create the tax-base required for the expansion of the strong public sector now characteristic of Scandinavia. Facing pressure from unions, work force immigration from outside of the Nordic countries was limited by new laws in 1967.

On a smaller scale, Sweden took in political refugees from Hungary and the former Czechoslovakia after their countries were invaded by the Soviet Union in 1956 and 1968 respectively. Some tens of thousands of American draft dodgers from the Vietnam War in the 1960s and 1970s also found refuge in Sweden.

=== 1968–1991 ===
In the latter half of the 1960s, the ideology of multiculturalism entered the political mainstream in Sweden, the first country in Europe. On 14 May 1975, a unanimous Swedish parliament led by the Social Democrat government of Olof Palme voted in favour on a new immigrant and minority policy which explicitly rejected the previous policy of assimilation and ethno-cultural homogeneity in favour of state-sponsored multiculturalism. The main driver of spreading Islam in Sweden is immigration since the late 1960s. As of 1970, the immigrants share of the population was below 7%. The demand for labor within the production industry declined and many Finns that had moved to Sweden in the late 1960s started to return to Finland. The period between 1970 and 1985 can be seen as a transition period from an immigration based on labor to an immigration based on refugees. Especially from former Yugoslavia (due to the Yugoslav Wars in the 1990s) but also from countries in the Middle East and Latin America. After seeing a number of refugees in the first half of 1989 (20,000), Carlsson I Cabinet decided to limit refugee immigration to only include refugees by the definition of United Nations.

== Contemporary immigration ==
Population pyramid segmented by background. Swedish background in color, foreign background in gray

Beginning in 2008, there was a long-term shift in the countries of origin, with a larger share of migrants with low education from non-European countries.

In 2009, immigration reached its highest level since records began with 102,280 people migrating to Sweden while the total population grew by 84,335 – in 2012 a new highest level was reached, again in 2013, and by a large margin again in 2016. At the same time, in 2016 the number of asylum applicants fell from the 2015 record of over 162,800, to 28,939, and 25,666 in 2017.

In 2010, 32,000 people applied for asylum to Sweden, a 25% increase from 2009, one of the highest numbers in Sweden since 1992 and the Balkan wars. The number of people that were granted asylum stayed the same as previous years. In 2009, Sweden had the fourth-largest number of asylum applications in the EU and the largest number per capita after Cyprus and Malta.

During 2010 the most common reason for immigrating to Sweden was:

1. Labour migrants (21%)
2. Family reunification (20%)
3. Immigrating under the EU/EEA rules of free movement (18%)
4. Students (14%)
5. Refugees (12%)

In 2010, 32,000 people applied for asylum to Sweden, a 25 percent increase from 2009; however, the number of people who received asylum did not increase because the large increase was in large part due to allowing Serbian nationals to travel without a visa to Sweden. Sweden has the highest asylum immigration per million inhabitants in Europe.

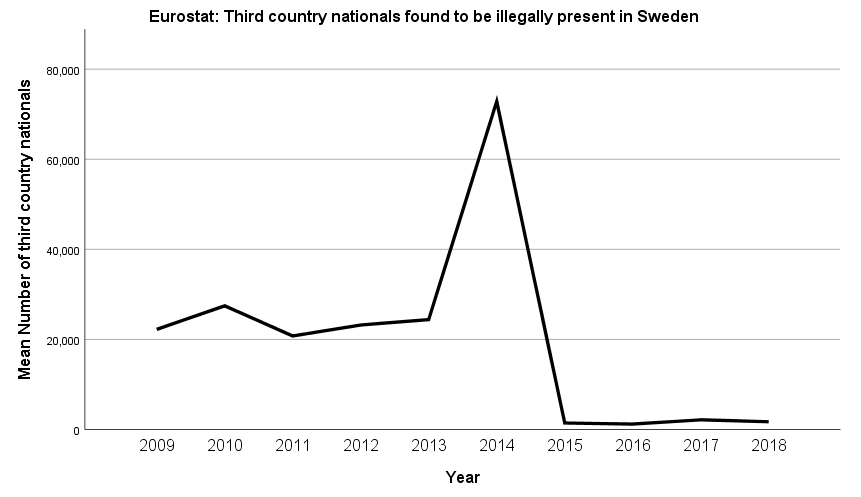
Eurostat Third Country Nationals illegally present in Sweden 2009–2014

The number of asylum seekers coming to Sweden increased beginning in 2014. 81,300 applied for asylum in 2014, which was an increase of 50% compared to 2013. It was the most since 1992, when 84,018 persons applied for asylum during the war in Yugoslavia. 77% (63,000) requests were approved but it differed greatly between different groups, such as Syrians and Eritreans where nearly everyone gets their application approved. In February 2015, it was expected that 90,000 apply for asylum in 2015 and 80,000 in 2016. The Swedish Migration Agency currently has shortage of 15,000 accommodations so they have to rent from private actors. At the end of April 2015, the figure for the year 2015 was revised down to 68,000–88,000 with 80,000 as the main scenario. Long processing times, and the situation in Iraq not developing in the way the Swedish Migration Agency had feared were the reasons for the revised figures. Nearly two weeks into October 2015, 86,223 had applied for asylum so far during the year. That was a record, surpassing the 1992 figure of 84,018 during the war in Yugoslavia. Emergency accommodation such as drill halls or offices were needed. All in all, 162,877 applied for asylum that year, many of which were processed after 2015, due to handling times. As of 2014, according to Statistics Sweden, there were around 17,000 total asylum immigrants from Syria (an increase of ~16,000 from 1990), 10,000 from Iraq (an increase of ~6,000 from 1990), 4,500 from Eritrea (an increase of ~4,400 from 1990), 1,900 from Afghanistan (an increase of ~1,800 from 1990), and 1,100 from Somalia (an increase of ~300 from 1990). In the year 2017, most asylum seekers came from Syria (267), Eritrea (263), Iraq (117), and Georgia (106).

A series of violent riots starting with the 2008 Malmö mosque riots and including the 2009 Malmö anti-Israel riots, 2010 Rinkeby riots, and 2013 Stockholm riots, during which groups made up mostly of young immigrants torched cars and buildings and threw rocks at police, led many Swedes to question Sweden's ability to integrate migrants.

During the refugee crisis of 2015, 29 percent of Swedes polled in September thought that Sweden was taking too many refugees – in November 2015, that figure had risen to 41 percent.

Among people receiving residence permits in Sweden during 2009–2017, 55.2 percent were men or boys, and 44.8 percent women or girls. (Note: The percentage was calculated by adding the numbers in the relevant table.: For the 2000–2017 total of asylum seekers, 66 percent were men or boys, and 34 percent women or girls.; During the record year 2015, 70.4 percent of the asylum seekers were men, and 29.6 percent were women.)

The four largest and most well-known Swedish newspapers reported more negative than positive news about immigration in the years 2010–2015. The reporting in other Swedish media outlets may not have offered a less negative picture of immigration to Sweden.

In March 2016, the production crew of the Australian TV program 60 Minutes were assaulted in Rinkeby when they were reporting the effect of European refugee crisis. The same month, Norway's minister of migration Sylvi Listhaug said to Norwegian media that Norway must avoid becoming like Sweden, in terms of immigration.

In April 2016, Reuters reported that at least 70 married girls under 18 were living in asylum centres in Stockholm and Malmö. Reuters added: "In Sweden, the lowest age for sex is 15 and marriage 18."

In June 2017, the Supreme Administrative Court of Sweden (HFD) ruled that illegal immigrants, such as those who stay in hiding after their asylum applications had been rejected in order to evade deportation, had no right to welfare benefits. A woman who was denied welfare benefits (försörjningsstöd, in Swedish) by the council of Vännäs had taken the council to court. The first instance ruled in the woman's favour, but the council took the case to the highest court, HFD, which ruled in favour of the council.

According to a 2017 Swedish Police Authority report on organised crime in Sweden, in autumn 2015, the number of asylum applicants to Sweden had markedly risen. The police authorities indicate that most of these asylum seekers had arrived via people smugglers, with compatriots smuggling compatriots being the most common scenario. Police authorities estimated that the smugglers charged several hundred thousand SEK. Many of the smuggled asylum seekers owed substantial debts to the traffickers, which left them vulnerable to exploitation by organised crime.

Data indicates that the smuggling networks would capitalize on the right of asylum seekers to establish their own housing (EBO) instead of accommodation organized by the Swedish Migration Agency. The smuggling networks would thereby organize accommodation for the smuggled in especially vulnerable areas, where the traffickers already had contacts in place. The traffickers thus exploit asylum seekers by using them as cheap or free labor, coercing them into under-the-table work, and siphoning off their welfare benefits.

In September 2024, the Swedish government announced that it would raise the existing benefit paid to migrants who voluntarily repatriate and leave Sweden from about $978 per adult to more than $34,000. The increase will take effect in 2026, and goes against the advice of a government-appointed inquiry that recommended against encouraging repatriation. According to Swedish MP Ludvig Aspling, the smaller grant had rarely been utilized, as only about 70 people applied for it in 2023 and just 1 person received it, out of 16,000 migrants who left Sweden in 2023.

=== Swedish immigration by country ===
Gross immigration by country
Country	2010	2011	2012	2013	2014	2015	2016	2017	2018	2019	2020	Total 2010–2020
Syria	1,261	1,769	5,349	14,397	26,113	30,590	51,540	22,327	14,387	6,128	3,293	177,154
Afghanistan	1,824	3,209	4,167	3,801	3,436	2,974	3,607	9,297	8,093	6,845	2,270	49,523
Iraq	5,321	5,292	4,247	3,205	3,391	4,082	4,901	7,236	4,883	3,601	2,271	48,430
Poland	4,517	4,500	4,505	4,677	5,138	5,596	5,078	4,405	3,817	3,177	2,530	47,940
Somalia	6,793	3,002	4,596	10,869	4,372	3,531	3,794	2,979	2,968	2,151	989	46,044
India	2,206	1,777	2,142	2,511	3,069	3,601	4,247	5,717	7,311	7,389	4,061	44,031
Eritrea	1,366	1,744	1,839	2,914	5,322	6,838	6,580	3,991	3,364	3,446	1,550	38,954
Iran	3,249	2,751	2,971	2,692	2,489	2,054	2,469	4,264	4,053	3,485	2,082	32,559
China	3,484	2,836	2,675	2,230	2,572	2,534	2,388	2,871	3,049	2,934	1,838	29,411
Germany	2,338	2,355	2,313	2,343	2,311	2,428	2,666	2,637	2,547	2,614	2,393	26,945
Finland	2,264	2,268	2,320	2,271	2,573	2,733	2,969	2,816	2,499	2,100	1,708	26,521
Denmark	2,732	2,595	2,182	2,025	1,776	1,853	1,863	1,721	1,706	1,660	1,679	21,792
Romania	1,780	1,970	1,757	1,898	1,990	2,305	2,278	2,162	2,200	1,903	1,274	21,517
Turkey	2,435	2,133	2,012	1,531	1,436	1,495	1,584	2,036	2,409	2,418	1,853	21,342
United Kingdom	1,512	1,908	1,760	1,699	1,966	1,813	2,047	2,154	2,270	2,072	2,084	21,285
Norway	2,058	2,010	2,094	1,991	2,041	1,998	2,067	2,047	1,899	1,739	1,321	21,265
Thailand	2,958	2,692	2,478	1,937	1,757	1,481	1,563	1,743	1,672	1,575	1,198	21,054
United States	1,661	1,600	1,783	1,765	1,758	1,565	1,595	2,112	2,032	1,920	1,587	19,378
Pakistan	1,682	986	998	921	904	1,189	1,302	1,847	2,586	3,225	2,441	18,081
Bangladesh	970	433	449	408	498	576	611	1,009	1,508	1,671	947	9,080
Total	98,801	96,467	103,059	115,845	126,966	134,240	163,005	144,489	132,602	115,805	82,518	742,306

Net immigration by country
Country	2010	2011	2012	2013	2014	2015	2016	2017	2018	2019	2020	Total 2010–2020
Syria	1,159	1,653	5,211	14,263	25,914	30,400	51,290	22,028	13,850	5,504	2,442	173,714
Afghanistan	1,668	3,075	4,006	3,647	3,305	2,807	3,493	9,155	7,966	6,687	2,061	47,870
Somalia	6,132	2,348	3,839	10,152	3,714	2,739	3,255	2,464	2,356	1,507	103	38,609
Eritrea	1,309	1,663	1,718	2,843	5,225	6,735	6,519	3,906	3,267	3,365	1,425	37,975
Iraq	3,993	3,928	2,568	1,275	1,451	1,940	3,486	5,900	3,467	2,172	757	30,937
Poland	3,086	2,970	2,816	3,247	3,883	4,170	3,553	2,795	2,002	1,120	289	29,931
India	1,442	810	833	1,208	1,367	1,340	2,509	3,993	5,596	5,364	2,135	26,597
Iran (Incl. Kurdistan province)	2,383	1,875	2,004	1,756	1,398	826	1,791	3,646	3,509	2,913	1,431	23,532
Thailand	2,640	2,247	1,963	1,445	1,168	692	1,108	1,365	1,187	1,149	797	15,761
China	2,835	1,684	1,199	1,124	809	−253	1,263	1,740	2,004	2,007	756	15,421
Romania	1,282	1,335	1,153	1,317	1,458	1,768	1,694	1,620	1,592	1,229	465	14,913
Turkey	1,930	1,521	1,341	780	646	420	927	1,447	1,853	1,873	610	13,348
Pakistan	1,131	296	218	240	229	301	995	1,520	2,226	2,873	2,010	12,039
Germany	992	941	980	960	1,029	984	1,385	1,364	1,101	1,028	829	11,593
United Kingdom	554	1,129	863	782	1,125	945	1,263	1,342	1,422	1,045	1,078	11,548
United States	763	741	724	849	708	107	643	1,123	1,110	951	602	8,321
Bangladesh	796	247	189	191	263	226	441	856	1,376	1,507	746	6,838
Norway	549	543	651	527	616	630	778	791	599	609	261	6,554
Finland	122	158	308	359	568	796	961	649	440	99	–286	4,460
Denmark	313	279	82	−177	−35	223	144	63	209	129	145	1,587
Total	48,853	51,179	51,747	50,715	51,237	55,830	45,878	45,620	46,981	47,718	33,581	531,548

== Demographics ==
=== Current population of immigrants and their descendants ===
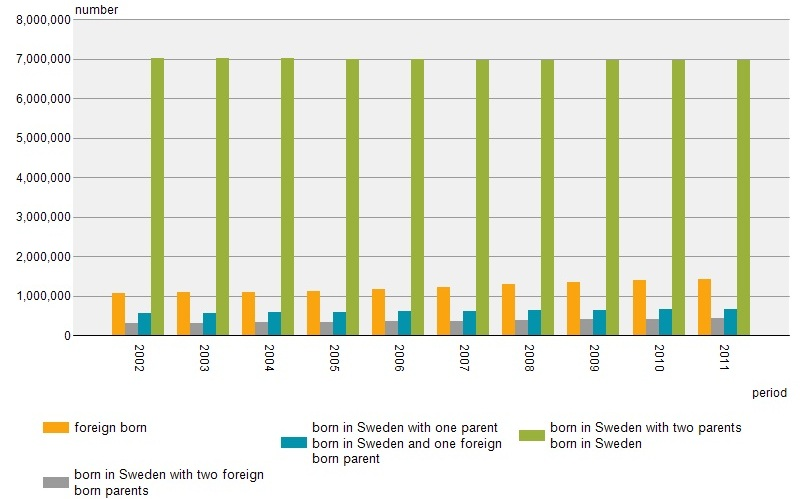
Population by ancestry, Sweden 2002–2011

There are no exact numbers on the ethnic background of migrants and their descendants in Sweden as the Swedish state does not base any statistics on ethnicity. This is, however, not to be confused with the migrants' national backgrounds which are being recorded.

In 2016, 1,784,497 residents were foreign born, 535,805 were born in Sweden to two parents born abroad, 739,813 had one parent born abroad and 6,935,038 had no foreign born parents. Statistics Sweden counts people born abroad or with two parents born abroad as having a foreign background, 2,320,302 persons met that requirement.

According to Statistics Sweden, as of 2016, there are a total of 400,203 residents of Sweden who hold citizenship from European Union states and other countries in Europe, 273,787 from countries in Asia, and 110,758 from countries in Africa.

Swedish and foreign born population pyramid in 2022

According to Statistics Sweden, as of 2016, there is a total of 8,541 foreign-born children and young adults aged 0–21 who are adopted in Sweden. Of these individuals, the most common countries of birth are China (3,977), South Korea (1,735), Colombia (1,438), Vietnam (1,241), and India (1,017).

Note that the table below lists the citizenship the person had when arriving in Sweden and therefore there are no registered Eritreans, Russians, Kosovo Albanians, Bosnians or Palestinians from 1990, they were recorded as Ethiopians, Soviets, Yugoslavs and Lebanese. The nationality of Yugoslavs below is therefore people who came to Sweden from the Socialist Federal Republic of Yugoslavia before 1991 and people who came from today's Montenegro and Serbia before 2003, then called the Federal Republic of Yugoslavia. Counting all people who came from Slovenia, Croatia, Bosnia and Herzegovina, Serbia, Montenegro, Kosovo, Macedonia, Serbia and Montenegro, the Federal Republic of Yugoslavia and the Socialist Federal Republic of Yugoslavia, there were 176,033 people from there in 2018.

The 31 most common foreign birth countries in Sweden
Country	1900	1930	1960	1990	2019	2023	2024	2025
Syria	−	−	6	5,874	191,530	197,201	196,152	194,606
Iraq	−	−	16	9,818	146,048	145,585	143,160	141,451
Finland	6,644	9,746	101,307	217,636	144,561	129,406	125,904	122,462
Poland	−	1,065	6,347	35,631	93,722	100,706	100,062	98,311
Iran (Incl. Kurdistan province)	2	8	115	40,084	80,136	86,838	87,115	87,292
Afghanistan	−	−	17	534	58,780	67,738	68,164	68,819
Somalia	−	−	−	1,441	70,173	68,290	66,846	65,960
India	45	135	361	9,054	40,641	58,094	59,290	61,298
(Serbia and Montenegro) former Federal Republic of Yugoslavia	−	19	1,532	43,346	64,349	60,636	59,692	58,757
Bosnia and Herzegovina	−	−	−	−	60,012	60,003	59,333	58,749
Germany	5,107	8,566	37,580	37,558	51,436	56,969	57,871	58,461
Turkey	15	22	202	25,528	51,689	56,871	57,389	57,783
Eritrea	−	−	−	−	45,734	49,639	49,704	49,740
Ukraine	−	−	−	−	11,069	14,287	41,767	47,960
Thailand	−	−	20	4,934	43,556	45,940	45,882	46,036
China (without Hong Kong)	34	201	520	3,896	35,282	38,253	38,976	40,338
Norway	7,978	14,731	37,253	52,744	41,578	39,951	39,370	38,934
Denmark	6,872	8,726	35,112	43,931	39,457	37,655	37,203	36,708
Romania	3	34	719	8,785	32,294	36,738	36,870	36,681
United Kingdom	779	1,270	2,738	11,378	29,979	32,916	33,143	33,278
Pakistan	−	−	11	2,291	19,107	28,614	29,760	32,075
Lebanon	−	−	15	15,986	28,508	29,876	29,774	29,576
Chile	6	28	69	27,635	28,025	27,756	27,427	27,186
Russia	1,506	−	−	−	22,265	25,568	26,529	26,680
United States	5,130	8,852	10,874	13,001	22,802	25,379	25,437	26,285
Ethiopia	5	−	59	10,027	21,686	23,363	23,463	23,634
Vietnam	−	−	1	6,265	20,676	21,983	21,842	21,998
Greece	5	22	266	13,171	19,547	21,237	21,520	21,720
Philippines	−	−	5	2,613	15,281	17,311	17,683	18,153
Lithuania	−	149	−	233	15,596	17,944	17,878	17,566
Hungary	50	108	8,544	15,045	16,728	16,900	16,960	16,858
Total immigrant population	35,627	61,657	299,879	790,445	2,019,733	2,170,627	2,200,238	2,210,636

Immigrant populations by Statistics Sweden 2016
Region	Population
Western Asia	392,539
Northern Europe	301,926
Southern Europe	215,089
Eastern Europe	183,318
Eastern Africa	133,181
Southern Asia	88,780
Western Europe	83,943
Southeastern Asia	78,133
South America	69,645
Eastern Asia	48,847
Northern Africa	33,044
Northern America	23,771
Western Africa	18,502
Central America	8,978
Central Asia	7,493
Middle Africa	6,982
Oceania	5,575
Caribbean	4,709
Southern Africa	3,049

Place of Birth	Year	
Place of Birth	2011	
Place of Birth	Number	%
Place of birth in reporting country	8,055,559	
Place of birth not in reporting country	1,338,010	
Other EU Member State	483,012	
Outside EU but within Europe	155,500	
Outside Europe/ Non-European	854,998	
Africa	123,291	
Asia	474,193	
North America	20,943	
Caribbean, South or Central America	76,355	
Oceania	4,716	
Total	9,482,855	100%

=== Gender demographics ===
As of 2019, there are 973,027 female immigrants compared to 982,542 male immigrants in Sweden. There is a striking gender imbalance by national origin in Sweden, with some groups contributing more females than males and vice versa. Immigrants from Thailand produced the sharpest sex imbalance, with 78% of immigrants from Thailand being women. 65-56% of immigrants from Afghanistan and Syria were men.

Record keeping for gender demographics began in 1749 in Sweden; at first, the country tended to have slightly more women than men, but in 2015, Sweden became a nation with slightly more men than women. Between March 2015 and May 2016, there were 12,000 more men than women in Sweden. A similar trend began in Norway in 2011. For Sweden, this has mostly been attributed to two factors: firstly, the increasing male life expectancy, as there is already a natural birth rate of around 105 males for every 100 females. The second factor is the role that immigrants have been playing in Sweden's demographics. In 2015, Sweden had a record-breaking number of unaccompanied young immigrants, 35,000. The largest gender imbalance is in the 15-19 age group where there are 108 boys per 100 girls.

However, in the 20-35 age group, there are more female than male migrants, due to a significant number of overseas women who migrate to Sweden to marry Swedish men.

=== Employment ===
The labour market among low-educated in Sweden 2005–2016 aged 20–64, per region of birth.

According to statistics collected by OECD, Sweden had in 2014 the highest negative gap in its employment rate between native and foreign-born population of the 28 OECD countries surveyed. This was for populations with both high and low education. Non-European immigrants with low education (sv: förgymnasial utbildning) of ages 20–64 had an unemployment rate of about 31.7% in 2005 which rose to 36.9% in 2016.

==== Employment disparities ====
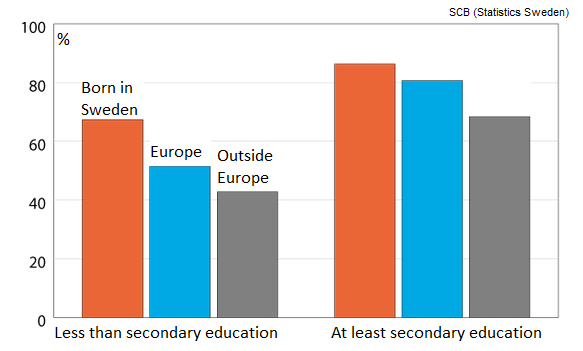
Statistics Sweden - Employment among persons aged 20-64 per region of birth and education level 2016. One hour of work weekly counts as "employed".

Sweden and the Netherlands have strong economies, but they have also the widest employment rate gaps between immigrants and non-immigrants of all OECD states. Before 163,000 asylum seekers that arrived in Sweden in 2015, the difference in employment rate was around 15 percent for those in between the ages of 15–64. For Swedes, 79% of this age group were employed while it was a mere 64 percent for foreign-born residents. When comparing native-born Swedes to non-EU immigrants, the employment gap between the two groups is even higher at 22.5 percent This is in contrast with the U.S., where native-born Americans are around 2.5 percent more likely to be unemployed than immigrants.

There are a couple speculations as to why Sweden is an anomaly in these arenas. First of all, between 2003 and 2012, one fifth of the permanent migrants into Sweden were considered humanitarian migrants. This is a higher percentage than all other OECD countries and likely plays a role in the employment gaps as humanitarian migrants typically find it more difficult to integrate into OECD countries. Secondly, less than 5 percent of jobs in Sweden require only a primary education or less.

Of the 163,000 asylum seekers in 2015, 500 were employed. Asylum seekers are, however, not automatically granted a work permit, with one third of working-age asylum seekers having received an exception to the work/residence permit requirement.

The report "När blir utrikesfödda självförsörjande?" by Professor Johan Eklund and Lecturer Johan P. Larsson at the Swedish Entrepreneurship Forum shows that a majority of the foreign-born in Sweden during the period 1990 to 2016 have not become self-sufficient with respect to earnings. The results differ from the official statistics, which do not differentiate between part-time and full-time employment. Individuals of working age, 20–64 years, who achieve half of the median income were included, as this is defined as the lower limit for self-sufficiency. According to this study, the self-sufficiency of domestic-born Swedes was 73 percent in 2016, whereas the corresponding proportion for individuals born in Africa was 38 percent, and 36 percent for those born in the Middle East. The report pointed out that this measurement method still overestimates the degree of self-sufficiency of migrants, since it does not exclude jobs that are tax-financed through labor market initiatives which thus constitute a form of social security.

== Effects of immigration ==
=== Public finances ===
Swedish Migration Agency annual expenditure (2007–2017) in billion (10^{9}) SEK. Expenditure is Område 8 and Område 13
According to table Redovisning mot anslag
Column Utgifter for each year in the annual reports.

Up until the 1970s, several studies have been made on immigrants' net contribution to the public sector. With the low immigrant unemployment rate and a smaller share of the total population, the studies concluded that immigrant net contribution to the public sector was either negligible, neutral or slightly positive. With increasing unemployment rates and a larger share of the total population, this was shown no longer to be true in 1999 by Ekberg. More recent studies such as Ruist show that the cost of refugees was one percent of GDP in 2007 and Aldén & Hammarstedt show that the average cost of a refugee that had been living in Sweden for five years was 120,000 SEK per year.

In 2015, Sweden received 163,000 asylum seekers and spent €6 billion (1.35 percent of GDP) on its migrants that year.

According to the Swedish National Audit Office, changes in the volume and composition of people seeking or being granted residence permit has significant consequences to the finances and organisations of public institutions administered by the state and municipalities. When the number of applications rise, there are nearly instantaneous volume effects for the expenses in the migration section of the government budget. The expenses concern mainly extended administration of residence application by the Swedish Migration Agency and courts, reimbursing municipalities for lodging and welfare benefits to asylum seekers. Since some grants to asylum seekers and expenses for lodging are payable during the application process, the expenses are affected by the duration of the asylum process.

Expenses of publicly funded SFI, in million (10^{6}) SEK. Swedish National Agency for Education (red) 2011, 2012, 2013, 2014, 2015, 2016 Municipalities & private organisers (grey) No SCB Data for municipalities prior to 2014.

The state budget for migration expenses increased fivefold from 6997 million SEK in 2004 to 33896 million in 2015, not counting the expenses for the European migrant crisis in the autumn of 2015. In the same 2004–2015, government forecasts consistently underestimated migration costs for migration (sv: Utgiftsområde 8 Migration) by several billion (10^{9}) annually. Whereas the volume of immigration directly affects public expenses, 11 out of 26 government propositions in the 2004–2015 time period neglected to predict or analyse the consequences of policy changes with regards to changes in numbers. In a further 11 propositions, the proposal is stated to not impact the numbers arriving without any reason given. In 16 propositions, no investigation for costs for municipalities is performed.

The impact of immigration is, however, not limited to the migration section in the budget. First generation immigrants, for example, constituted 53 percent of those serving long prison sentences, and people born outside Europe account for 44.5% of the unemployed.

In a calculation made by The Swedish Pensions Agency, immigrants were expected to generate an additional 70 billion SEK for the pension system thanks to the increased number of people working, but also add 150 billion SEK in costs. According to an official investigation in 2017, immigration to Sweden will double the state's expenses for pensions to the population. A 2018 paper argued that refugee immigration had a net negative fiscal impact, both in the short and long-term, with effects being highest in the first few years. Over time refugees make a positive fiscal contribution but this is not enough to cover the initial deficit and the deficit that appears as they approach retirement age. A 2019 paper examined whether immigration could support Sweden's ageing population. The paper concluded, based on current rates of labour market integration, that GDP per capita and public finance would not be improved sufficiently to compensate for an ageing population. However, immigrants could potentially bring large growth gains if labour market integration was improved significantly.

=== Demographics ===
Immigration has had a significant effect on the demographics of Sweden. Since World War II, Sweden's fertility rate has dropped, like other developed nations. Due to the high birthrates in the early post-war years and the steep decline in the late 20th century, Sweden has one of the oldest populations in the world. In 2009, 102,280 immigrants entered Sweden, while the total population grew by 84,335.

According to the Sweden Democrats, the high immigration rate, low fertility and high death rate is gradually transforming the previously homogeneous nation of Sweden into a multicultural country. The party criticised the country's current immigration policies, claiming that they could pose a major demographic threat to Sweden in the future. In 2011, it was expected that the Muslim minority in Sweden would grow from five percent to 10 percent by 2030.

=== Crime ===
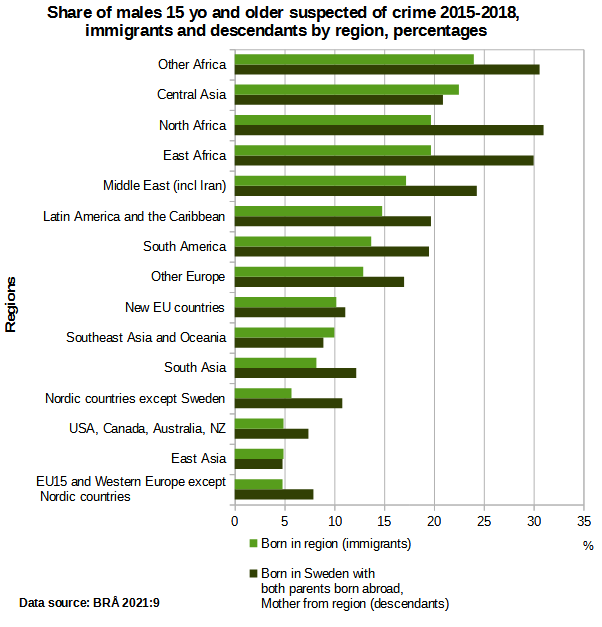
Data source: Swedish National Council of Crime Prevention (Swedish: Brottsförebyggande Rådet or BRÅ)

According to Swedish crime statistics, those with an immigrant background are responsible for a greater proportion of crime than their share of the population. Research shows that socioeconomic and cultural factors, such as unemployment, poverty, linguistic shortcomings, and absence of skills, explain a significant portion of the differences in crime rates between immigrants and natives.

According to Mats Lofving, vice National Police Commissioner of the Swedish Police Authority, in a controversial interview with Monica Saarinen on Ekot Saturday, 5 September 2020, intelligence gathered by police concluded that there are about 40 crime clans who have come to Sweden solely in order to pursue organized crime. He asserted that they are primarily settled in Stockholm, Södertälje, Gothenburg, Malmö, Landskrona and Jönköping. Lofving added that in these organized mafia like crime clans, the extended family raises the children to take over the organized crime activities and they have no ambitions to become integrated into Swedish mainstream society.

In 2020, local police officers in Stockholm told Agence France-Presse that law enforcement authorities were effectively sidelined in inter-family disputes. After a "clan"-based gang dispute had caused disruption, including incidents of violence, it was resolved between the parties in conflict, without police involvement; no arrests had been made.

Swedish prime minister Stefan Löfven (Social Democrats) had long denied that crime gangs had anything to do with immigration, but in September 2020 changed his stance in an SVT interview, where he said that a large immigration led to difficulties with integration, which in turn increased risk of crime.

A 1996 report by the Swedish National Council for Crime Prevention (Brå) explored crime among immigrants and children of immigrants between 1985 and 1989, compared to the rest of the Swedish population. The tendency, according to the report, was that the more serious the crime, the higher number of reported crimes had a foreign-born perpetrator. The crime with the highest incidence of foreign-born accused was rape, with 38 percent of registered perpetrators being foreign-born, murder and manslaughter at 30 percent, 26 percent of thefts in stores, 24 percent of robberies, and 20–21 percent of physical abuse cases.

The general over-representation in crime for foreign-born individuals was 2.2 per thousand: For specific categories of crime the highest level of overrepresentation was in physical assault on a man unknown to the perpetrator at 4.0 per mille (unstandardized, with an uncertainty interval of 3.8–4.2 per thousand (Note: Or 4.7 as a standardized value, with effects of age, sex and residence area accounted for. See note in reference.)), with rape 4.5 (unstandardized, with uncertainty interval of 4.0–5.1 (Note: Or 4.0 as a standardized value, with effects of age, sex and residence area accounted for. See note in reference.)). 12 percent of the immigrant population has been implicated in committing some sort of crime.

Children of immigrants were also over-represented in crime, but to a much lesser degree – 50 percent higher in general compared to non-immigrant Swedes. For physical assault of a man unknown to perpetrator, the standardized over-representation was 3.2 per thousand, the highest for the group, and for rape, 1.5 (0.3 per thousand incidents for children of immigrants, compared to 0.2 for children of locally-born parents). The share of foreign born individuals guilty or suspected of rape was less than 0.3 per thousand according to a 2005 report by Brå. Both the 1996 and 2005 reports have been criticized for using insufficient controls for socioeconomic factors.

2013–2018 birthplace of rapists convicted in Sweden, total 843

In 2018, Swedish television's investigative journalism show Uppdrag Granskning (UG) analysed the total of 843 district court cases from the five preceding years resulting in convictions and found that 58% of all convicted of rape had a foreign background and 40% were born in the Middle East and Africa, with Afghanistan being the next most common country of birth after Sweden. When only analysing rape assault (Swedish: överfallsvåldtäkt) cases, that is cases where perpetrator and victim were not previously acquainted, 97 out of 129 were born outside Europe. The BBC, reporting on the Uppdrag Granskning episode, emphasized that only a very small number of rapes resulted in convictions, and there was no data available on the ethnicity of perpetrators in the 6,000–7,000 rapes per year reported between 2009 and 2017 which had not gone to court. The BBC also asked the chief editor of Uppdrag Granskning why they had aired a potentially inflammatory episode just before the 2018 Swedish general election: the response was that immigration was a major issue for every political party in Sweden, and Swedes needed an understanding of their own country.

In a 2016 report on sexual harassment, police found ten cases where groups of men (aged 25–30) or boys (aged 14–16) had surrounded a lone girl and sexually assaulted her while filming, along with groups of girls being subjected to the same experience. Only a few perpetrators were identified, and all investigations in Stockholm and Kalmar involved suspects from Afghanistan, Eritrea or Somalia. Most investigations were dropped due to difficulty in identifying the perpetrators and collecting evidence.

After criticism arose that Sweden was experiencing an increase in crime due to immigrants and refugees, Jerzy Sarnecki, a criminologist at Stockholm University, claimed, "What we're hearing is a very, very extreme exaggeration based on a few isolated events, and the claim that it's related to immigration is more or less not true at all." According to Klara Selin, a sociologist at the Swedish National Council for Crime Prevention (Brottsförebyggande rådet), abbreviated Brå, the major reasons why Sweden has a higher rate of rape than other countries is due to the way in which Sweden documents rape ("if a woman reports being raped multiple times by her husband that's recorded as multiple rapes, for instance, not just one report") and a culture where women are encouraged to report rapes. Stina Holmberg at Brå noted that "there is no basis for drawing the conclusion that crime rates are soaring in Sweden and that that is related to immigration".

According to data gathered by Swedish police from October 2015 to January 2016, 5,000 police calls out of 537,466 involved asylum seekers and refugees. According to Felipe Estrada, professor of criminology at Stockholm University, this shows how the media gives disproportionate attention to and exaggerates the alleged criminal involvement of asylum seekers and refugees. Speaking in February 2017, Manne Gerell, a doctoral student in criminology at Malmo University, noted that while immigrants were disproportionately represented among crime suspects, many of the victims of immigrant crimes were other immigrants. He also opined that "Immigration will come with some cost, and we will likely have a bit more crime in a society with low crime rates".

A Swedish Police report from May 2016 found that there have been 123 incidents of sexual molestation in the country's public baths and pools in 2015 (112 of them directed at girls). In 55 percent of cases, the perpetrator could be reasonably identified. From these identified perpetrators, 80% were of foreign origin. The same report found 319 cases of sexual assault on public streets and parks in 2015. In these cases, only 17 suspected perpetrators have been identified, four of them Swedish nationals, with the remainder being of foreign origin. Another 17 were arrested, but not identified. In 2015, when the highest number of asylum seekers entered the country, the number of reported rapes declined by 12 percent; it increased in 2016, and in 2017 had surpassed the 2014 level.

According to Dagens Nyheter in 2017, at least 90% of all gun-related murders and attempted murders in Sweden are committed either by immigrants or those with at least one immigrant parent, and according to Expressen, 94.5 percent of all members of career criminal gangs in Stockholm are either immigrants or have at least one immigrant parent. The share of foreigners admitted to the Swedish Prison and Probation Service increased from 26 percent in 2003 to 33 percent in 2013, according to its statistics. In its 2017 report on organized crime in Sweden, police stated that in most areas of Sweden with the highest crime rates (sv: särskilt utsatta områden), the population share of immigrants is around 50–60%. In recent years, some of these areas have experienced riots, such as the 2008 Malmö mosque riots, 2010 Rinkeby riots, 2016 riots in Sweden and 2017 Rinkeby riots. Immigrants have also been associated with a series of highly publicised crimes, including the 2015 Ikea stabbing attack, 2016 Sweden asylum centre stabbing, and the 2017 Stockholm truck attack.

A 2014 survey of several studies found that people with a foreign background are, on average, two times more likely to commit crimes than those born in Sweden. This figure has remained stable since the 1970s, despite the changes in numbers of immigrants and their country of origin. Some studies reporting a link between immigration and crime have been criticised for not taking into account the population's age, employment and education level, all of which can affect the level of crime. In general, research that takes these factors into account does not support the idea that there is a link between immigration and crime.

The last government report that collected statistics on immigration and crime was a 2005 study by the Swedish National Council for Crime Prevention (Brå), and it found that people of foreign background were 2.5 times more likely to be suspected of crimes than people with a Swedish background. This included immigrants being four times more likely to be suspected of lethal violence and robbery, five times more likely to be investigated for sex crimes, and three times more likely to be investigated for violent assault. A 2006 government report suggested that immigrants face discrimination by law enforcement agencies, which could lead to meaningful differences between those suspected of crimes and those actually convicted. A 2008 report by the Brå found evidence of discrimination towards individuals of foreign descent in the Swedish judicial system. The 2005 report found that immigrants who entered Sweden during early childhood have lower crime rates than other immigrants. By taking account of socioeconomic factors (gender, age, education and income), the crime rate gap between immigrants and natives decreases. In 2017, some opposition parties called for a government report on the relationship between immigration and crime.

A 2013 study by Stockholm University showed that the 2005 study's difference was due to the socioeconomic differences (e.g. family income, growing up in a poor neighborhood) between people born in Sweden and those born abroad. The authors furthermore found "that culture is unlikely to be a strong cause of crime among immigrants".

A study published in 1997 attempted to explain the higher than average crime rates among immigrants to Sweden. It found that between 20 and 25 percent of asylum seekers to Sweden had experienced physical torture, and many suffered from post-traumatic stress disorder. Other refugees had witnessed a close relative being killed.

Another study published in 2021 showed a potential violation to sexual rights of young migrants in Sweden: around 25 percent of young migrants 16 to 29 years old were exposed to sexual violence. Higher prevalence of exposure to sexual violence were reported among men (26%) compared to women (21%). Higher exposure to sexual violence were also reported among those waiting for their resident permit (40%) in Sweden and those coming from South Asia (36%). Sexual violence against unaccompanied migrants from South Asia and the Middle East in Sweden are also well documented

The 2005 study reported that persons from North Africa and the Middle East had the highest overrepresentation in crime statistics, whereas those born in Western Europe, Southeast Asia and the United States had the lowest representation. However, a 1997 paper additionally found immigrants from Finland, South America, the Arab world and Eastern Europe to be overrepresented in crime statistics. Studies have found that native-born Swedes with high levels of unemployment are also over-represented in crime statistics.

A 2013 study found that both first- and second-generation immigrants have a higher rate of suspected offences than native Swedes. While first-generation immigrants have the highest offender rate, the offenders have the lowest average number of offenses, which indicates that there is a high rate of low-rate offending (many suspected offenders with only one single registered offense). The rate of chronic offending (offenders suspected of several offenses) is higher among native Swedes than first-generation immigrants. Second-generation immigrants have higher rates of chronic offending than first-generation immigrants but lower total offender rates.

In March 2018, the newspaper Expressen investigated gang rape court cases from the two preceding years and found that 43 men had been convicted. Their average age was 21, and 13 were under the age of 18 when the crime was committed. Of the convicted, 40 out of the 43 were either immigrants (born abroad) or born in Sweden to immigrant parents.

=== Extremism ===
According to a 2017 study by the Swedish Defence University on Sweden's foreign fighters, a few people emigrated from Sweden to Afghanistan during the 1990s, mostly individuals with origins in the Horn of Africa and North Africa. At the start of the 2000s, individuals originating from the Middle East and North Africa comprised most of the persons involved in the Islamist milieu in Sweden. Additionally, male and female converts and Sweden-born second-generation immigrants were among the militant ranks. Some of the foreign fighters who emigrated from Sweden also originated in the former Yugoslavia and Russia. As of 2017, most of the opposition fighters in Syria and Iraq were native Syrians and Iraqis. Foreign fighters in the region hailed from 38 different nations. Of the individuals who arrived from Sweden, 75 percent were citizens of Sweden and 34 percent were Sweden-born; 80 percent of these, were from the counties of Västra Götaland, Stockholm, Skåne and Örebro. Over 70 percent of the latter have been residents of designated vulnerable areas in Sweden. Among the militant organizations that the foreign fighters in general belonged to were Hezbollah, Hamas, the PKK, the GIA, the Abu Nidal Organization, the Japanese Red Army, the Red Army Faction, Al-Qaeda, the Islamic State, Al-Shabaab, Ansar al-Sunna and Ansar al-Islam. In 2010, the Swedish Security Service estimated that a total of 200 individuals were involved in the Swedish violent Islamist extremist milieu. According to the Swedish Defence University, most of these militants were affiliated with the Islamic State, with around 300 people traveling to Syria and Iraq to join the group and Al-Qaeda associated outfits like Jabhat al-nusra since 2012 (36 first-time travellers in 2012; 98 in 2013; 78 in 2014; 36 in 2015; and five in 2016).

According to Göteborgs-Posten, 11 percent of the youths in the north-eastern suburbs of Gothenburg admit to sympathizing with Islamist terror groups (with non-Muslims also included in the survey), and 80 percent of female Muslim students admitted living under oppression from honour culture.

According to research by the Swedish Civil Contingencies Agency, the Muslim Brotherhood has a very strong foothold and influence in Sweden.

Three times as many cases of terrorism financing were reported in Sweden in 2017, compared to 2016.

=== Education ===
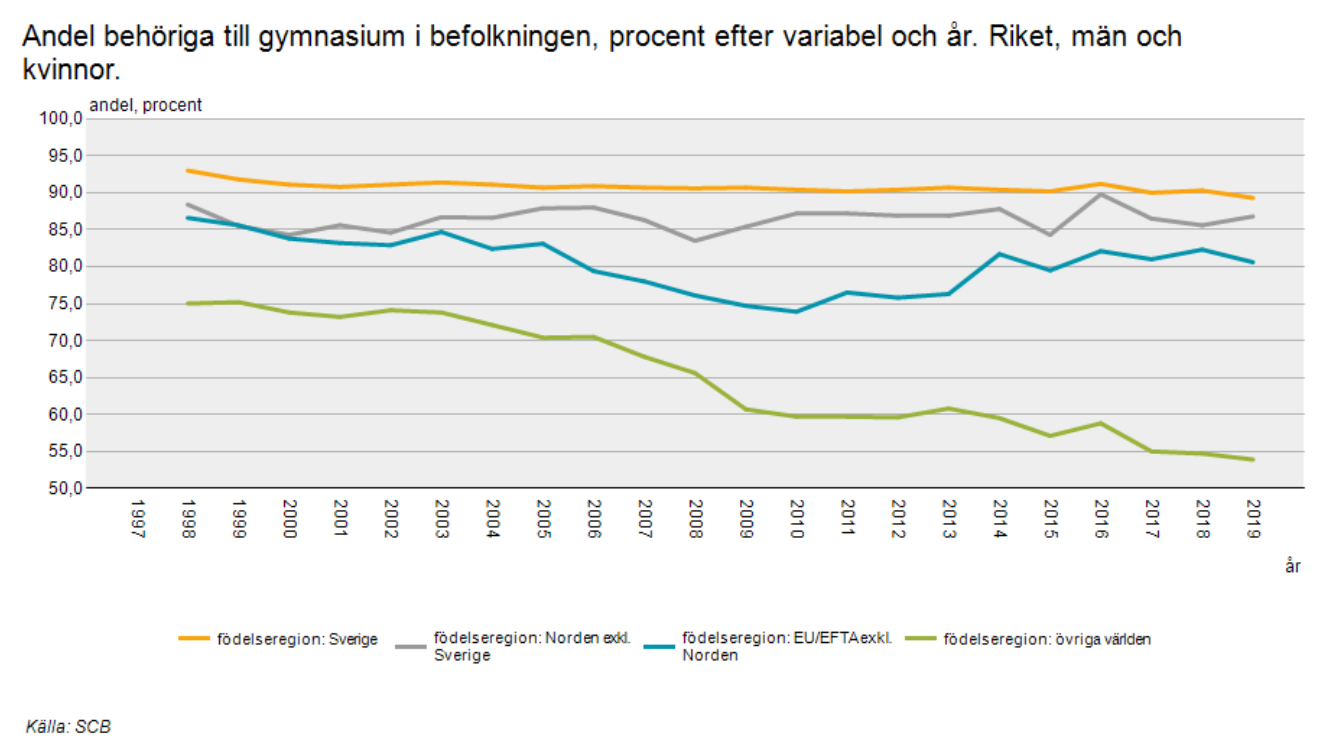
Percentages of population having completed primary education 1998 – 2019. Born in Sweden (yellow), Nordic Countries except Sweden (grey), EU/EFTA except Nordic Countries (blue), Outside Europe (green). Source Statistics Sweden 2021.

According to the National Agency for Education, in 2008, due to the closer similarity between the Swedish language and the native languages of Yugoslavia, pupils from the former Yugoslavia (who comprised a large portion of asylum immigrants during the 1990s) had greater ease in learning Swedish than pupils from more remotely located Iraq, Afghanistan, Somalia and Syria.

In 2015, about 35 percent of foreign-born residents had insufficient skills in literacy and numeracy, compared to about five percent of the domestic-born. The difference in skills was greater than in other comparable countries. The reasons for this discrepancy were that Sweden had a higher share of migration based on asylum rather than labour migration, and that many migrants had not resided in the country long enough to master the language.

In 2018, researcher Pernilla Andersson Joona at Stockholm University found that 50% of recently arrived migrants had less than the Swedish 9-year basic education (Swedish: grundskolekompetens).

In 2015, Radio Sweden reported that of immigrant children who come to Sweden at the age of 12 or older, only a quarter manage to finish high school and qualify for college. Of those who came to Sweden aged 9–11, about half passed their high school exams.

==== Comparison between migrant and domestic education ====
Low-educated in Sweden 2005–2016, ages 20–64, per region of birth [%]

In the Programme for the International Assessment of Adult Competencies (PIAAC), qualifications from the country of origin could not be assumed to be equal to the same formal qualification from a Swedish institution; neither when it came to general skills in numeracy or literacy nor specific skills in a particular field. An analysis of PIAAC test scores found that migrants from the Arab states and Sub-Saharan Africa with a high education level (ISCED level 5 and 6) had numeracy skills equivalent to those of low education from Sweden, North America and Western Europe. Low education was defined as less than 2 years of secondary education, equivalent to the compulsory 9-year education (sv: grundskola). Of the individuals who indicated that they had a high education level, 44 percent of those from the Arab states and 35 percent of those from Sub-Saharan Africa were assessed to have insufficient skills.

==== Programme for International Student Assessment ====
In the 2015 Programme for International Student Assessment (PISA), a triennial worldwide study by the Organisation for Economic Co-operation and Development (OECD) of 15-year-old native and immigrant pupils' scholastic performance, overall students in Sweden performed better than the OECD average in reading (stable since 2006), around the OECD average in mathematics (a decline since 2006), and close to the OECD average in science (a drop since 2006). Immigrants in Sweden generally underperformed compared to the OECD average and the gap in performance to native students showing a steadily widening trend since 2006.

This underperformance of immigrants in Swedish schools has been cited as a significant part of the reason why Sweden has dropped more than any other European country in the international PISA rankings.

==== Swedish For Immigrants ====
According to the SFI and Vuxenutbildningen Luleå, the Swedish For Immigrants adult language program comprises three different tiers: Sfi 1, Sfi 2, and Sfi 3. Sfi 1 consists of the study courses A and B, which are aimed at pupils with little or no education and individuals who are illiterate. Sfi 2 includes the study courses B and C, which are earmarked for students who have undergone many years of schooling but are unfamiliar with the Latin script. Sfi 3 includes the study courses C and D, which are geared toward pupils with college education that are seeking further studies.

In the five years leading up to 2012, the number of illiterate migrants doubled, they had fewer than three years to no schooling from their origin country. In 2011, about 19,200 migrants in the Swedish for immigrants programme had 0–3 years of education. For instance in Borlänge, 4 out of 10 of those who completed the introduction for immigrants had no education at all, the majority being women.

As of 2007, according to the National Center for SFI and Sweden as Another Speech (NC) and the Institute for Sweden as Another Speech (ISA), a total of 137 foreign languages were spoken as mother tongues by students within the Swedish For Immigrants program. Of these languages, the most common mother tongues of pupils within the Sfi 1 tier were Arabic (2,000), Thai (1,500), Somali (1,500), Kurdish/North Kurdish (1,150), Southern Kurdish (740) and Turkish (650).

According to Statistics Sweden, as of 2012, the most common countries of birth for pupils in the Swedish For Immigrants program are Iraq (13,477), Somalia (10,355), Thailand (5,658), Poland (5,079), Iran (Incl. Kurdistan province) (4,748), Turkey (3,344), China (3,408), Eritrea (3,618), Afghanistan (3,640), and Syria (3,257). The most common mother tongues spoken by the students are Arabic (18,886), Somali (10,525), Persian (7,162), Thai (5,707), Polish (5,100), English (4,796), Spanish (4,552), Tigrinya (3,623), Turkish (3,064), and North Kurdish (3,059).

=== Espionage ===
Espionage where foreign nationals illegally spy on compatriot immigrants in Sweden has repeatedly happened in Sweden. According to the Swedish Security Service, this is particularly the case for origin countries that do not respect human rights. This is the case with Rwanda, Iran & Kurdistan, Syria, Eritrea, Libya and Turkey. For instance, a Rwandan diplomat at the Rwandan Embassy in Stockholm was expelled because of spying on Rwandan refugees. Also, a Burundian man was sentenced to eight months in prison by the Örebro county court for spying on Rwandan regime critics living in Sweden between the years 2010 and 2011 before handing over the intelligence to the Rwandan regime. Also, Turkish interpreters in Sweden have encouraged migrants to become informants on behalf of Turkish authorities.

=== Segregation ===
According to Statistics Sweden in 2007, the larger cities Stockholm, Gothenburg and Malmö are segregated. Segregation is not limited to the larger cities but also is a feature in many types of towns differing in size and location, like Kristianstad, Örebro, Trollhättan, Borås, Eskilstuna, Helsingborg, Örnsköldsvik and Jönköping. Children with Nordic or EU25 heritage more often grow up in areas dominated by Swedes, while children from Africa, Asia and non-EU countries grow up in areas with high immigrant populations.

According to researcher Emma Neuman at Linnaeus University, segregation sets in at population share around three or 4 percent of non-European migrants in a district, while European immigration shows no such trend. The study comprised the 12 largest municipalities of Sweden for the period 1990–2007. High income earners and highly educated move out of non-European migrant districts first where ethnic segregation in turn leads to social segregation.

A study at Örebro University concluded that while Swedish parents stated positive views towards the values of multiculturalism, in practice they still chose Swedish-majority schools for their offspring so their children won't be an ethnic minority during their formative years and to get a good environment to develop their native Swedish language.

=== Public health ===
Number of HIV healthcare patients in Sweden ages 0–85 male & female

According to the Public Health Agency of Sweden, cases of tuberculosis have increased steadily among immigrants from about 200 in 1989 to a peak of 750 in 2015, in 2016 the number of cases dropped as fewer migrants arrived. In the same period, the number of tuberculosis cases among Sweden-born dropped from 400 in 1989 to 50 in 2016.

From 2006 to 2016, the number of individuals applying for treatment for HIV increased from 1,684 to 6,273 (373%), which according to National Board of Health and Welfare was due to increased immigration from countries with higher levels of HIV.

According to the National Board of Health and Welfare in 2016, an estimated 20–30% of asylum seekers suffer from mental disorder.

Based on UNICEF rates for the practice of female genital mutilation (FGM) in various countries in Africa, the Swedish National Board of Health and Welfare (Socialstyrelsen) estimated in 2015 that around 38,000 foreign-born women living in Sweden may have been circumcised in their countries of origin. Socialstyrelsen indicated that there were no known instances of FGM procedures having been carried out while women resided in Sweden, and that although there may have been unreported cases, official figures for these were unavailable.

Immigrants in Sweden of non-European background report three to four times as often as Swedish natives that they suffer from poor or very poor health. This is particularly evident in regard to diminished work abilities and physical disabilities, but also in regard to anxiety and nervousness. However, the disparities between Swedish born and non-Swedish born residents' health were in part explained by the social differences across groups. These include occupation, living accommodation, and to have poorer economic resources than the average citizen. This suggests that the social living conditions play significant role in the health of immigrants in Sweden. Furthermore, poorer health can also likely be contributed to the fact that a decade is typically necessary for a refugee or immigrant to have the same living conditions of a native Swede. Finally, simply perceiving discrimination may also play a role in the high mental health illness rate among immigrants.

==== Tuberculosis ====
Cases of tuberculosis (TB) in Sweden are connected to the patient's country of origin when that country has a high rate of TB. infectees born abroad constituted 34 percent of all cases in 1989 and the fraction of born abroad had increased to 82–89% in the 2008–2013 period.

In 2009–2013, the largest group of TB were Somalis in Sweden, with around 1100 cases, with Eritreans in Sweden the next largest group with slightly below 200 cases. The next largest groups were from Afghanistan, Thailand, Ethiopia, Iraq, India and Pakistan.

The TB infection rate of Somalis in Sweden (550 / 100 thousand) is higher than that of the rate in Somalia itself reported by WHO (290 / 100 thousand) likely due to the fact that Swedish health institutions are better at discovering an infection.

In 2017, the average rate of infection in Sweden was 5.4 cases per 100 000 persons and years. The number of cases among patients born abroad was increasing and the number of patients born in Sweden was in steady decline since the 1940s.

=== Trust ===
Sweden is together with other Nordic countries for its high level of both institutional and interpersonal trust. According to surveys by SOM Institute, the trust in institutions were not affected by the large waves of immigration during the European migrant crisis. A 2017 study by Lund University also found that social trust was lower among people in regions with high levels of past non-Nordic immigration than among people in regions with low levels of past immigration. The negative effect on trust was more pronounced for immigration from culturally distant countries.

=== Honour culture ===
According to John Åberg, it is unclear how many people are experiencing honour culture in Sweden. The phenomenon is associated with socially isolated immigrant families. State statistics from Sweden suggest that around 70,000 people might experience from honour-related oppression. Researcher Astrid Schlytter claims, based on unspecified research conducted in other countries, that the number could be as high as 240,000.

=== Language ===
- Immigrant languages in Sweden
- Rinkeby Swedish

== Public opinion ==
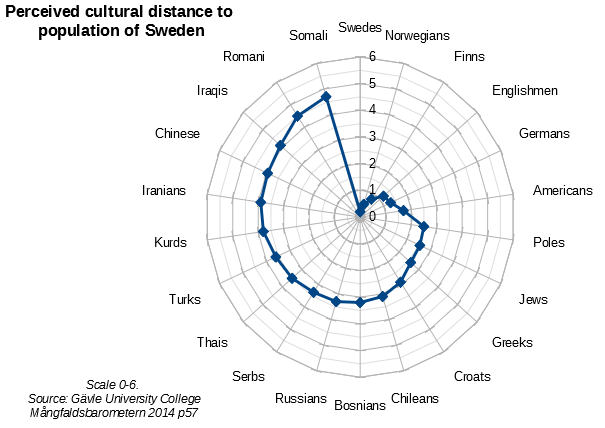
Source: Gävle University College

A 2008 study, which involved questionnaires to 5,000 people, showed that less than a quarter of the respondents (23%) wanted to live in areas characterised by cultural, ethnic and social diversity.

A 2014 study published by Gävle University College showed that 38% of the population never interacted with anyone from Africa and 20% never interacted with any non-Europeans. The study concluded that while physical distance to the country of origin, also religion and other cultural expressions are significant for the perception of cultural familiarity. In general, peoples with Christianity as the dominant religion were perceived to be culturally closer than peoples from Islamic countries.

A 2016 SOM Institute survey published by University of Gothenburg reported that between the years 2011 and 2016, the estimated share of people with concerns about the increasing number of immigrants increased from around 20 percent to 45 percent. In the period 2014–2016, the share of people having concerns about xenophobia increased from 38 to 45 percent, and the proportion of individuals having concerns over an increased number of refugees rose to 29% in 2015.

On the question of repatriation of the asylum immigrants, 61 percent of native respondents in 1990 thought that it was a good suggestion, with this figure steadily decreasing over the ensuing years to a low of around 40% in 2014. In 2015, there was an increase in respondents in favor of repatriation; 52 percent deemed it a good suggestion. The proportion of respondents who felt repatriation was neither a good nor bad proposal simultaneously dropped from almost 40 to 24 percent.

In 2018, a poll by Pew Research found that a majority (52%) wanted fewer immigrants to be allowed into the country, 33 percent wanted to keep the current level, and 14 percent wanted to increase immigration.

== Politics ==
The Centre Party is a pro-immigration party, and in their campaign for the 2006 Swedish general election, they proposed to double the number of immigrants entering Sweden to 90,000 persons, or one percent of the Swedish population. This was to be facilitated by issuing permanent residence.

In late 2012, the party stated it wanted to open the borders completely to immigration, including removing requirements for some degree of job skills and a clean criminal record. The party stressed the Canadian model and referred to it as a more successful one, stating that had Sweden followed it the population of Sweden would have been over 40 million in 2012.

The former Social-Democratic Party minister of finance Kjell-Olof Feldt stated in October 2017 that the half million unemployed immigrants in Sweden are a ticking time bomb.

In December 2017, Minister for Finance Magdalena Andersson stated in an interview with Dagens Nyheter that integration of immigrants had not worked well in Sweden since before 2015 and that the situation had become very strained since. Andersson added that there were more possibilities to receive housing and education in other European countries where the asylum process is quicker. She also expressed that the Swedish Social Democratic Party should be self-critical about Sweden being unable to receive more migrants than society has the capacity to assimilate.

From 2019 to 2022, due to changes in political views and growing discontent with immigration, and because of increased numbers of crimes committed by immigrants and other consequences of immigration, the country aims to reduce its rate of immigration by an average of 6.34% per year.

After the 2022 general election, the Swedish government saw a surge in support for right-wing parties, notably bolstered by the rise of anti-immigration sentiments.

== Comparison with other European Union countries 2023 ==
According to Eurostat 59.9 million people lived in the European Union in 2023 who were born outside their resident country. This corresponds to 13.35% of the total EU population. Of these, 31.4 million (9.44%) were born outside the EU and 17.5 million (3.91%) were born in another EU member state.

Country	Total population (1000)	Total Foreign-born (1000)	%	Born in other EU state (1000)	%	Born in a non EU state (1000)	%
EU 27	448,754	59,902	13.3	17,538	3.9	31,368	6.3
Germany	84,359	16,476	19.5	6,274	7.4	10,202	12.1
France	68,173	8,942	13.1	1,989	2.9	6,953	10.2
Spain	48,085	8,204	17.1	1,580	3.3	6,624	13.8
Italy	58,997	6,417	10.9	1,563	2.6	4,854	8.2
Netherlands	17,811	2,777	15.6	748	4.2	2,029	11.4
Greece	10,414	1,173	11.3	235	2.2	938	9.0
Sweden	10,522	2,144	20.4	548	5.2	1,596	15.2
Austria	9,105	1,963	21.6	863	9.5	1,100	12.1
Belgium	11,743	2,247	19.1	938	8.0	1,309	11.1
Portugal	10,467	1,684	16.1	378	3.6	1,306	12.5
Denmark	5,933	804	13.6	263	4.4	541	9.1
Finland	5,564	461	8.3	131	2.4	330	5.9
Poland	36,754	933	2.5	231	0.6	702	1.9
Czech Republic	10,828	764	7.1	139	1.3	625	5.8
Hungary	9,600	644	6.7	342	3.6	302	3.1
Romania	19,055	530	2.8	202	1.1	328	1.7
Slovakia	5,429	213	3.9	156	2.9	57	1.0
Bulgaria	6,448	169	2.6	58	0.9	111	1.7
Ireland	5,271	1,150	21.8	348	6.6	802	15.2

== See also ==
- Afghans in Sweden
- Opposition to immigration
- Remigration
- Islamophobia in Sweden
- Lars Vilks Muhammad drawings controversy
- List of countries by net migration rate
- List of sovereign states and dependent territories by immigrant population
- Outline of Sweden
- Refugee controversy in Sjöbo
- Sweden-bashing
- Swedish nationality law

== Sources ==
- Taub, James (10 February 2016), "The Death of the Most Generous Nation on Earth", Foreign Policy
- "Sweden and migration", Sweden.se, 20 March 2017, archived from the original on 26 May 2019
