= 2016 riots in Sweden =

Periods of civil unrest in Sweden

On 15 May 2016, unrest occurred simultaneously in the Swedish towns of Norrköping and Borlänge, primarily in Million Programme Muslim-dominated public housing-areas, with stone-throwing against police and firefighters, car fires and arson attacks. The unrest took place across Sweden since late March. Public transportation was temporarily suspended in several areas due to stone-throwing against trams and buses. These incidents were mainly perpetrated by Muslim youths. These incidents were considered particularly notable as they represented the spread of unrest to outside the three major urban areas of Sweden. Across Sweden, more than 2,000 cars were set on fire between January and July 2016.

== Notable incidents of unrest ==
=== Norrköping and Borlänge ===
Stone-throwing had been a problem in the Klockaretorpet borough of Norrköping for weeks before the escalation of violence on 15 May, when youths set fire to cars and escalated stone-throwing at police and firefighters. Police found stone storages on house roofs in the area. Seven cars were totally destroyed by fire in Klockaretorpet during the night of 15 May, and three during the night of 16 May. Car fires were also reported in the borough of Hageby. On 24 May, seven to eight youths were reported to have disturbed peace in the borough of Navestad, and health service cars were damaged by car fires while police escorting firefighters were attacked with stones being thrown. On 28 May, cars were set on fire at three different locations in Norrköping. The following weekend, car fires spread to the previously unaffected boroughs of Klingsberg, Såpkullen and Åby.

Sporadic car fires occurred for several weeks in Tjärna Ängar in Borlänge prior to 15 May, when youths began throwing stones at police and firefighters during calls to attend to a series of fires. Civilians were reportedly also the targets of stone-throwing, including the employees of a local store, as well as a witness driving through the area, who reported to have had their car attacked. One person was beaten and kicked while on the ground by a group of seven perpetrators, as they thought the victim had called the police. During the night of 20 May, two taxis had their windows smashed by pavement stones. On the morning of 21 May, firefighters were called out to a fire of a garbage shed in the same area. A local supermarket was forced to close early on the evening of 21 May due to stone-throwing attacks against the store, and store employees having the tires of their cars slashed. According to reports, people targeted by stone-throwing included women and children. The residents of Tjärna Ängar expressed anger and frustration over the unrest. A night watch group of local residents, spearheaded by a local Somalian organization, quickly mobilized to try and ease the unrest. Residents also criticized the lack of the police arrests during the unrest, many expressing frustration that no suspects had been caught. In an editorial a local resident criticized the living conditions of the government owned housing in Tjärna Ängar, where for six months some residents had to go outside of their homes to use temporary showers and toilets. The editorial also criticized the coverage of Tjärna Änga, which focused on unrest rather than the neighborhoods poor conditions.

=== Other incidents of unrest ===
Starting on Easter Eve, 26 March, the Uppsala boroughs of Gottsunda and Valsätra were struck by a series of fires to cars, garbage sheds and other loose items. As firefighters and police arrived, they were attacked by stone-throwing youths. Riots continued for several nights with fires and over forty youths throwing stones. Since buses were attacked with stones during that same time, the local public transportation cancelled evening routes to certain areas for a period of time. On 9 June, some thirty youths threw stones at police cars after the police were called out to investigate an arson in the borough of Stenhagen. In response to this unrest youths from the area worked together with a local night watch organization. After the unrest, a conflict resolution strategy was implemented to help create a dialogue between police and young people as well as engaging adults in the area. This strategy is credited with stopping the unrest in Stenhagen. Unrest was reported with arson and stone-throwing in boroughs including Gränby on 16 June.

Oxhagen in Örebro saw unrest starting on 5 May when some twenty youths pelted security guards and police with stones after a call out to a burglary alarm, and set fire to a container. The unrest was said to be a response against police misconduct after intervening in a fight the day before. The police were accused of beating a suspect and then dropping him in the woods. After a third night of unrest, on the morning of 7 May, a newly renovated youth centre set to be opened later that month was burned to the ground in an arson attack, while stores and hair salons were damaged. Witnesses were attacked with stones. In the borough of Vivalla, stone-throwing against buses repeatedly cancelled routes to the area. On 18 May, up to fifty youths attacked police with stones after police were called out to thwart new unrest.

In Hässleholmen in the town of Borås, between ten and thirty youths on 10 May attacked police, vandalized a police van, and stabbed a police officer as a response to a police patrol controlling a moped rider. After police investigations, several youths were later brought in for interrogation, some being arrested and charged with rioting. On 21 May, a police patrol in Borås was attacked with stones by youths attempting to set fire to car tires.

Starting on the evening of 25 May, unrest broke out in Brandkärr in Nyköping with arson attacks and stone-throwing against police. The unrest continued for several nights, with up to twenty-five youths throwing stones against police cars and breaking 26 windows of a local school, and arson attacks against garbage collections.

There were notable instances of car fires reported in Lund, Södertälje, Bro, Sundsvall, Linköping and Västerås, stone-throwing against emergency services in Landskrona, Växjö, Eskilstuna, Katrineholm, Kristianstad and Gislaved, and car fires as well as arson and stone-throwing attacks in Malmö, Gothenburg—where stone-throwing repeatedly stopped tram traffic—and Stockholm suburbs.

=== Public responses ===
In response to the unrest, the centre-right opposition Alliance parties demanded hiring 2,000 more police officers and sharpening sentences for attacks against emergency services, stone-throwing, and rioting. The Minister for Home Affairs Anders Ygeman said he wanted more police in problem areas, and did not rule out law-changes.

The right-wing populist party Sweden Democrats proposed a law of a minimum four-year sentence, and automatic deportation of foreign citizens involved in rioting.

Swedish Prime Minister Stefan Löfven said during a speech on 6 June, the National Day of Sweden, that "our country shall never be characterised by stone-throwing and segregation", and that "strong economic growth" must be "transformed into strong social cohesion".

On 17 August, the government proposed a series of measures designed to combat arson attacks on cars in Swedish cities. They pledged to allocate more police in areas with high criminality, tougher penalties, speeding up prosecution, and more video cameras. Centre Party leader Annie Lööf criticized the proposals lack of concrete measures. Professor of Criminology Jerzy Sarnecki criticized the proposed tougher penalties as being more symbolic than effective.

==== International reactions ====
In May, a news team of the Norwegian public broadcaster NRK and economist Tino Sanandaji along with Swedish police were twice attacked and chased out of the Stockholm suburbs of Husby and Rinkeby. Norwegian Minister of Migration Sylvi Listhaug of the right wing Progress Party in response said "I think everyone who saw the report from Sweden on the evening news were stunned by the situation in our neighbouring country", stating that it only proved what a "naive and overly-kind immigration policy can lead to". NRK-correspondent for Africa and Asia, Anders Magnus described Swedish journalism as being "among the most deplorable" he had ever experienced during his research of the feature, reportedly having little interest in researching and informing about the situation, and he described shock at the violence against police in Sweden.

== Analysis ==
Professor of Geography Eva Andersson who has written extensively about segregation and unrest classified the unrest as "quite common and has happened for a long time". Her research indicates that unrest tends to spike in May when school begins to end. Jörgen Karlsson former police chief in Tensta, Rinkeby and Husby emphasizes the importance of trying to increase trust in the authorities in areas where unrest is common.

According to the police, civil unrest with stone-throwing against police originated in the Malmö-suburb of Rosengård in 2004. Youth gangs calling in false alarms with the goal of ambushing the arriving police officers with stone-throwing, a phenomenon known as "police fishing", has since become increasingly prevalent in Swedish suburbs.

Economist and anti-immigration pundit Tino Sanandaji linked the situation to poor integration of immigrants in Sweden and criticised the failure to publicly address problems linked to immigration by labeling all criticism as racism. Soheila Fors, founder of the Khatoon-foundation for immigrant women, described the stone-throwing youths as an increasingly more ideological "border defence", behind which ethnic enclaves are established where Sharia becomes law, enforced by radical Salafi Islamists.

== See also ==
- 2008 Malmö mosque riots
- 2009 Malmö anti-Israel riots
- 2010 Rinkeby riots
- May 2013 Stockholm riots
- December 2013 Stockholm riots
- 2017 Rinkeby riots
- Vulnerable area
