= May 2013 Stockholm riots =

Race riots in Stockholm, Sweden

2013 Stockholm Husby riots
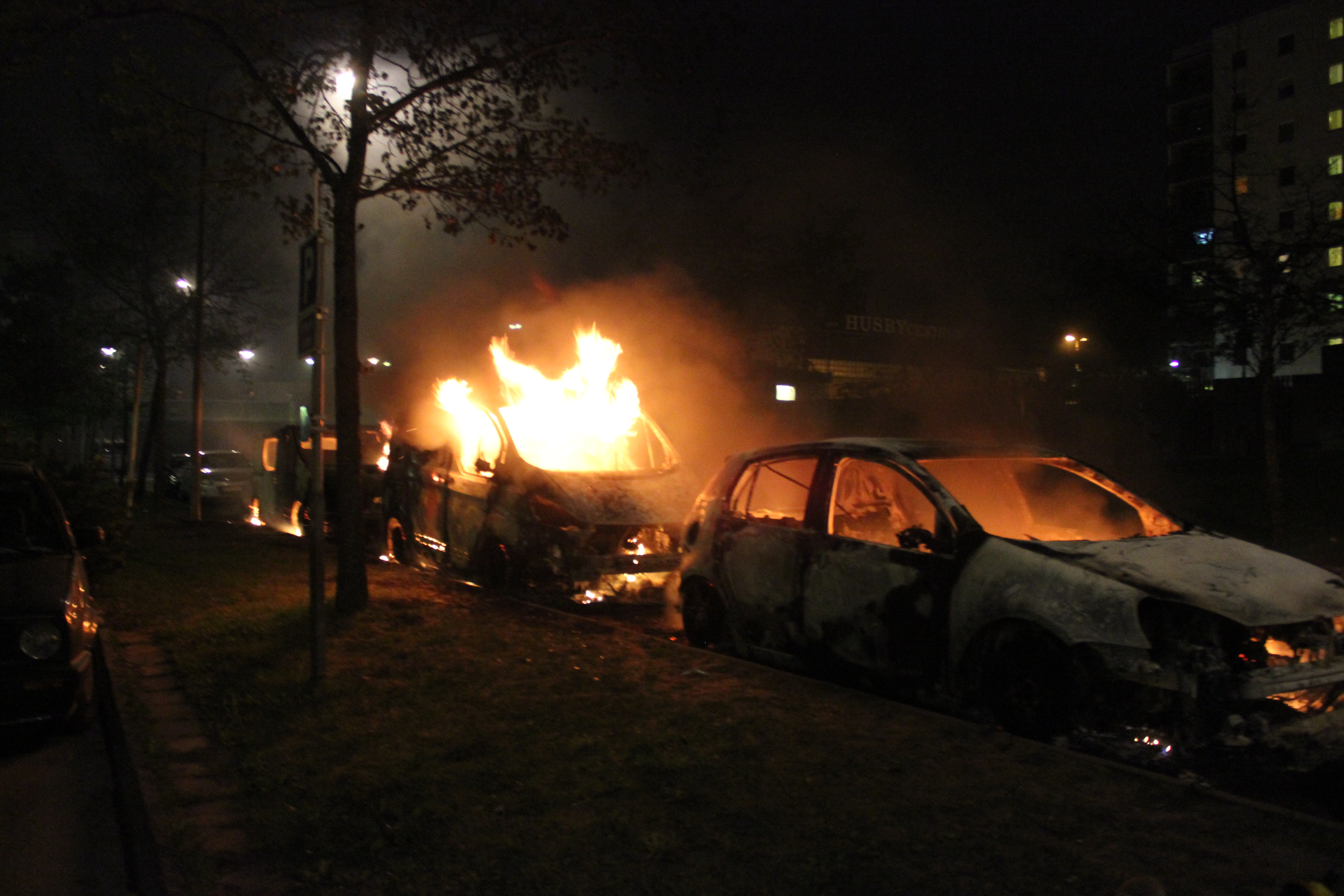
- Second day of the Stockholm Husby riots. The picture shows three cars on fire in the Stockholm suburb of Husby, 20 May 2013
- Date: 19 May 2013 – 28 May 2013
- Location: Husby, Stockholm, Sweden; 59°24′34″N 17°55′37″E
- Methods: Rioting; arson; assault
- Result: Dozens of rioters arrested, police regain control of areas affected.

Parties
Swedish Police Authority; Swedish Security Service	Rioters: Immigrant youth	Vigilantes: Right-wing groups; Neo-Nazis

Number
	50–100	50-60

Casualties and losses
7+ police officers injured		

On 19 May 2013, violent disturbances broke out in Husby, a suburb dominated by immigrants and second-generation immigrant residents, including a substantial number from Somalia, Eritrea, Afghanistan and Iraq, in northern Stockholm, Sweden. The riots were reportedly in response to the shooting to death by police of an elderly man, reportedly a Portuguese expatriate, armed with a puukko knife, after entering his apartment and then allegedly trying to cover up the man's death.

The Husby political group Megafonen published a blog post on 14 May, the day after the shooting, in which the deceased man was referred to as "non-white". Megafonen also called for a demonstration against "police brutality" on 15 May, two days after the shooting, in the same post.

The disturbances involved several hundred youths and resulted in the injury of at least seven police officers. On Tuesday 28 May, the Stockholm police reported that the situation was "back to normal" with no rioting, only a few burned-out cars, and no reports of unrest in other Swedish towns either.

== Background ==
Stockholm has suffered disturbances of a similar nature in poor and segregated areas several times since 1975. In the 2010 Rinkeby riots up to 100 youths threw bricks, set fires and attacked the local police station in Rinkeby for two nights in a row.

== Disturbances ==
The disturbances began on the night of Sunday 19 May 2013, when youths started setting cars on fire in Husby. At least 100 vehicles were destroyed. A garage was also set on fire, which forced the evacuation of an apartment block, and a shopping center was vandalized. The police, called out at 10 pm, were then stoned by youths, and three officers were injured. Calm had returned by 5:30 am. The police estimated that about 50 to 60 youths had been involved in the riot, but no arrests were made.

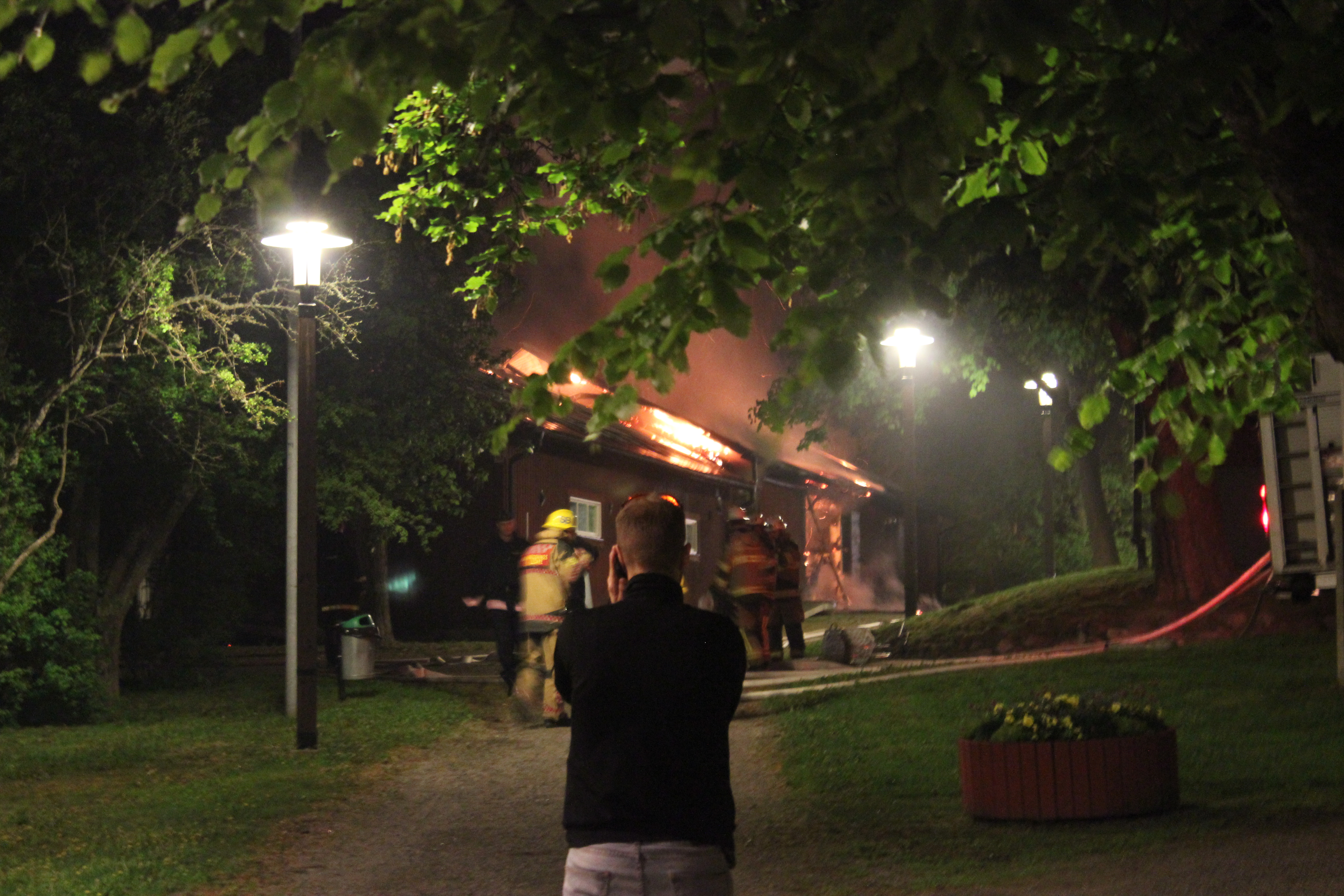
The picture shows the burning Husby Gård, set aflame during the riots.

The disturbances continued on Monday night, 20 May. Rioters set fire to eleven cars and four waste containers and threw stones at the police and firefighters who were fighting the fire. Seven officers were injured. The police estimated that about 50 to 100 people had been involved in the day's disturbances, some of whom were as young as 12 or 13, but the majority were adults. Calm had returned by 4 am. Seven people between the ages of 15 and 19 were arrested for assaulting public officials. Two were released and a third was found to be a minor.

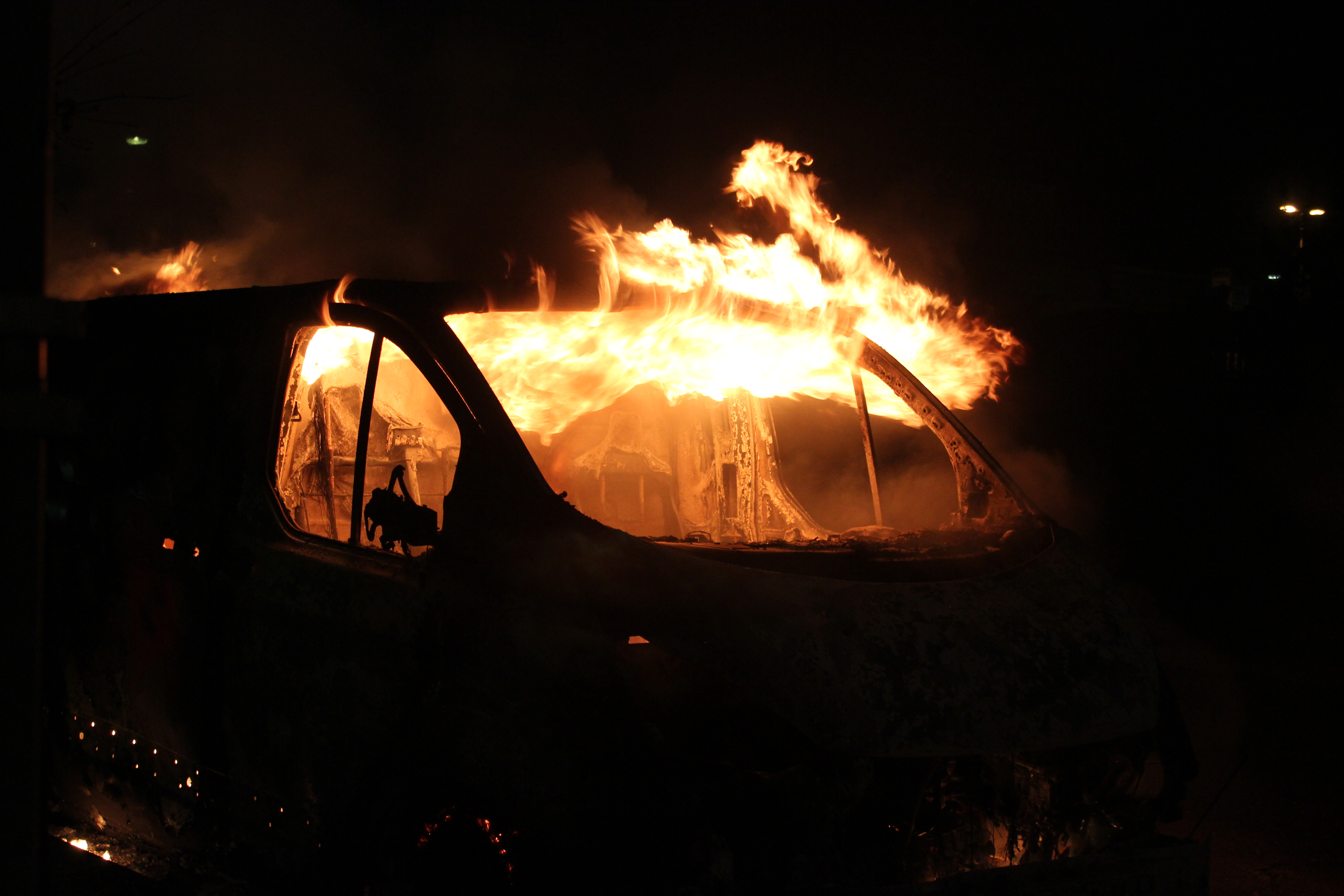
Second day of the Stockholm Husby riots. The picture shows a van on fire in the Stockholm suburb of Husby, 20 May 2013.

There was a smaller disturbance in southern Stockholm, but it is not known whether it was related to Husby. The trouble also spread to Fittja, Kista, Rinkeby, and Tensta. On the night of Tuesday 21 May, the disturbances spread to Bredäng, Edsberg, Flemingsberg, Norsborg and Skarpnäck. Thirty cars were set on fire, and the Jakobsberg police station and shopping center were vandalized. Eight people were arrested. Calm had returned by 3 am. The disturbances continued on 22 May when a large number of cars were set on fire. In Rinkeby 7 cars were burned. In Rågsved, a police station was burned down. In Hagsätra, the police were attacked at 10 pm, and one police officer was injured. In Skogås, a restaurant was burned down and firefighters were attacked with stones. On Thursday, 23 May, at about 8 pm (CET) police were called to Rinkeby to a spot where five cars had been set on fire. Youths also threw rocks and glass bottles at a Metro station in Vällingby, breaking windows on several Metro trains and threatening staff at the station before leaving the scene. After midnight, several small fires were reported in Tensta and Farsta. At least two schools, a police station and 15 cars were set ablaze. Thirteen people were arrested that night and the following morning.

By 24 May, the disturbances in Stockholm had subsided. Parents and volunteers patrolling the streets helped calm Stockholm's multi-ethnic suburbs. In the meantime, the disturbances had spread to other parts of Sweden, including Örebro, while the situation in Husby where the trouble originated was reported to be under the complete control of law enforcement officers. During the night, police arrested 18 right-wing extremists and confiscated their vehicle, which was full of weapons, only a few hours after they had joined the unrest. During the following weekend, Stockholm was mostly calm, with little or no disturbances.

On Monday 27 May, disturbances flared up again near Stockholm. Several cars belonging to local home care were set on fire in Lysekil in the west of Sweden. A preschool in Solna was set on fire as well, although the police could not confirm that the incident was related to the riots. In Växjö in the district of Araby, several tyres were burned and stones were thrown at police.

On Tuesday 28 May, Stockholm police reported that the situation was "back to normal" with no disturbances, only a few torched cars, and no reported disturbances in other Swedish towns either.

=== Damage ===
In total, 150 vehicles were set on fire—most belonging to immigrants—and total damages were at least 63m Swedish kronor ($9.5m).

== Response ==
=== Government response ===
On the afternoon of Tuesday, 21 May, the Prime Minister of Sweden Fredrik Reinfeldt announced: "We've experienced two nights of serious unrest, vandalism and an intimidating atmosphere in Husby, and there is a risk that it will continue. We have groups of young men who think that they can and should change society with violence. Let's be clear about this: this is not acceptable. We cannot be intimidated by violence."

The Minister for Justice Beatrice Ask said a report should be filed detailing any incidents of mistreatment by police.

=== Police response ===
Youths threw stones at police officers, which resulted in three injuries on the night of Sunday 19 May, and seven on the following night. The police adopted a policy of non-intervention during the disturbances, explaining that their goal was to "do as little as possible". Seven youths were arrested on Monday night, and eight were arrested on 21 May.

Ulf Johansson, deputy police chief for Stockholm County, stated on 23 May that "every injury is a tragedy, every burned-out car is a failure for society... but Stockholm is not burning. Let's not exaggerate the situation."

=== Public reaction ===
Husby residents were angered by the rioters, because of the damage to property and Husby's reputation. Some expressed the belief that the earlier shooting incident had been exploited by the youths to start trouble. They also blamed the lack of involvement from parents. Many left-wingers in Sweden blamed the trouble on the neo-liberal political shift in Sweden during the previous decade, which had widened class differences. The disturbances also started a debate amongst Swedes over minority integration, many of whom had arrived as a result of the country's asylum policies.

On 25 May, rap artist Timbuktu released "Budskapet", a Swedish version of the 1982 song "The Message" by Grandmaster Flash and the Furious Five, as a commentary on the disturbances.

While responding to the fires caused by the rioters, firefighters also became the target of stone-throwers. One firefighter who was injured, Mattias Lassén, subsequently posted an open letter to the rioters on his Facebook page, asking "Why did you do this to me? I too have a family that wants to see me again, just like you!". His post quickly went viral.

== Analysis ==
The justice minister, Beatrice Ask, said "Social segregation is a very serious cause of many problems." Reports suggested that the unrest had been fed by substandard schools and an undercurrent of racism, unemployment, a failure to integrate minorities, and rising social inequality. Some cited the riots as evidence of the failure of Sweden's immigration policy. Others referred to the recent OECD report that showed a rapidly widening gap between Sweden's rich and poor.

After Aftonbladet published figures indicating that 13 of the 16 youths arrested had police records, the Swedish criminologist Jerzy Sarnecki stated that he was not surprised. Sarnecki believes that the disturbances had not been caused by one single incident, but that the rioters were expressing a general dissatisfaction with unemployment levels, standards of education and the police service, and drew parallels with the 2011 England riots. A local political group, Megafonen, had claimed at the start of the disturbances that they were caused by the recent shooting by police of a 69-year-old man in Husby who had allegedly threatened to kill the officers with a machete. Sarnecki dismissed this idea, saying that it was mostly an excuse. Psychologist Arnulf Kolstad argued that the disturbances were an understandable and necessary reaction to social segregation. He suggested that they should be welcomed like most Nordic people welcomed the Arab spring.

== See also ==
- 2008 Malmö mosque riots
- 2009 Malmö anti-Israel riots
- 2017 Rinkeby riots
- 2016 Sweden riots
- 2013 Trappes riots
- 2010 Rinkeby riots
- 2009 French riots
- 2008–09 Oslo riots
- 2007 Villiers-le-Bel riots
- 2006 Brussels riots
- 2005 French riots
