= 2010 Rinkeby riots =

2010 rioting in Stockholm, Sweden

- Date: June 2010
- Location: Rinkeby, Stockholm, Sweden; 59°23′17″N 17°55′43″E
- Methods: Rioting; arson

Parties
Swedish Police Authority	Rioters: Arab swedish and Somali swedish youth

Number
	100

On 8 June and 9 June 2010, youth riots broke out in Rinkeby, a multicultural area in west Stockholm, Sweden. Up to 100 youths threw bricks, set fires and attacked the local police station in Rinkeby.

== Rioting ==
The riot broke out late on the evening of 8 June, when a group of young adults were refused admittance to a junior high school dance; angered, they responded by throwing rocks through the windows of the school. From there, the rioting spread. Rioting continued for two nights. Police estimate that about 100 young men participated in the rioting, throwing bricks, setting fires and attacking the police station.

Rioters threw rocks at police, attacked a police station and burned down a school, throwing rocks at responding fire engines and preventing fire fighters from reaching the school in time to save the building.

=== Analysis ===
Social activist George Lakey describes the 2010 Rinkeby riots as among the earliest riots by multicultural youth in Sweden.

Founder of iona Institute - the Catholic Pressure Group, commentator David Quinn linked the riots to immigration of Muslims blaming "the mainstream political parties, aided for the most part by the mainstream media," for abetting the rise of right wing political movement by "refus(ing) to permit an open and honest debate about" the causes of this and other riots by immigrant youth, and also by ignoring the "anti-Semitism, sex abuse, voter fraud," in immigrant communities.

Sociologist Peggy Levitt attributes the riots to anger over "long-term youth unemployment and poverty."

== Background ==
Rinkeby is noted for its high concentration of immigrants and swedish people with immigrant ancestry. 89.1% of the population of Rinkeby had a first or second-generation immigrant background as of 31 December 2007.

== See also ==
- 2022 Sweden riots
- 2017 Rinkeby riots
- 2013 Stockholm riots
- 2016 Sweden riots
- 2008 Malmö mosque riots
- 2009 Malmö anti-Israel riots
- 2013 Trappes riots
- 2011 English riots
- 2009 French riots
- 2007 Villiers-le-Bel riots
- 2006 Brussels riots
- 2005 French riots
