= Soheila =

Soheila is a female given name of Persian origin, and may refer to:

- Soheila Esfahani, Iranian-born Canadian artist and educator
- Soheila Fors (born 1967), Iranian-Swedish women's rights activist, and writer
- Soheila Hejab (born 1990), Iranian lawyer, political activist, and civil rights activist
- Soheila Jolodarzadeh (born 1959), Iranian reformist politician
- Soheila Mansourian (born 1988), Iranian Wushu athlete
- Soheila Sokhanvari (born 1964), Iranian-born British multidisciplinary visual artist
- Soheila Zaland, Afghani pop singer

== See also ==
- Litta Soheila Sohi (born 1966) Iranian dressage rider
