= Somalis in Sweden =

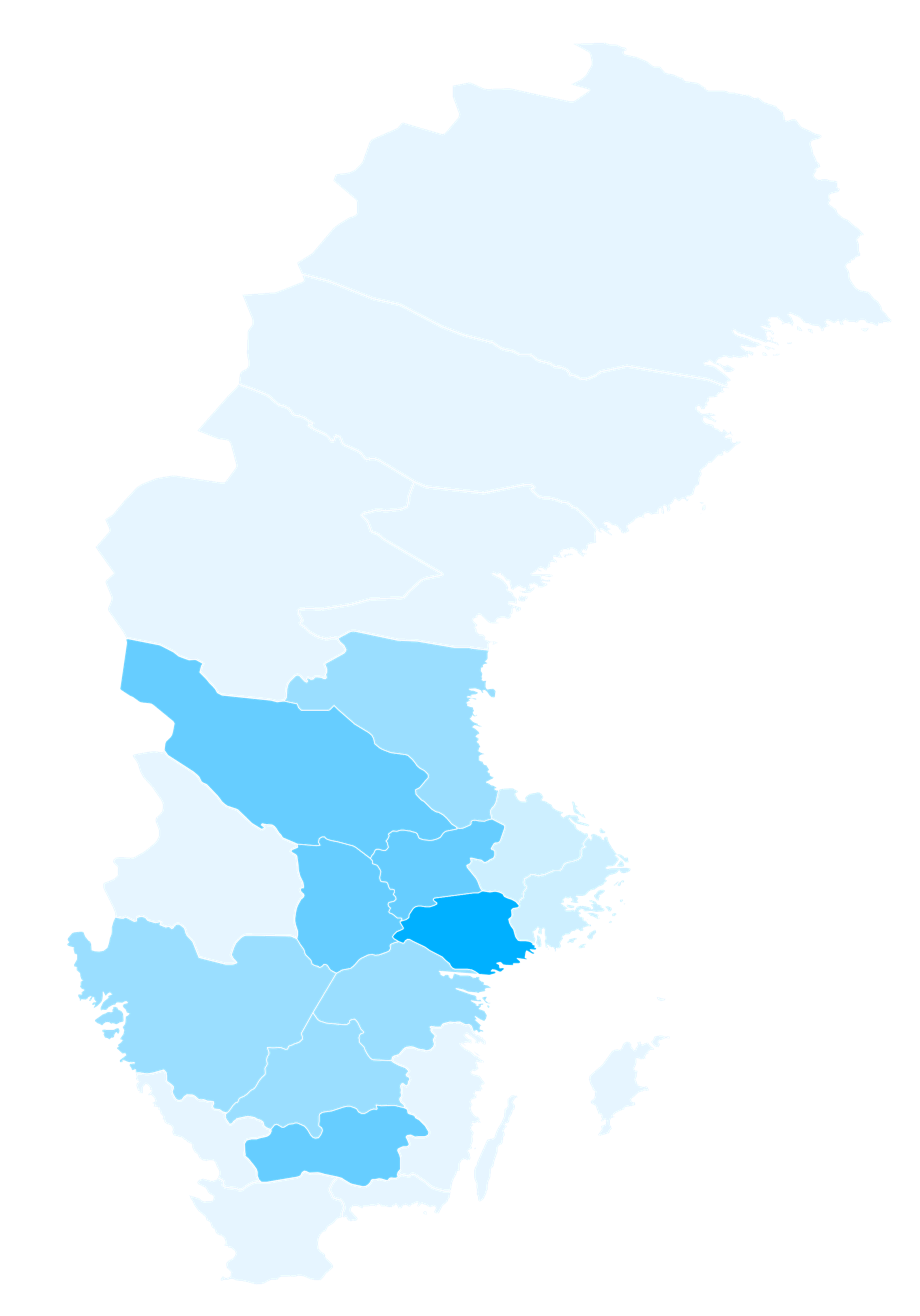
- By birth as a percentage of county population >1.5% (Södermanland) 1–1.5% 0.75–0.99% 0.5–0.74% <0.5%

Total population
- 70,173 (born in Somalia); 31,761 (both parents born in Somalia)

Regions with significant populations
- Stockholm, Gothenburg, Malmö, Linköping

Languages
- Somali · Swedish · Arabic

Religion
- Islam

Somalis in Sweden (Swedish: Somalier i Sverige; Somali: Soomaalida Iswiidhan) are citizens and residents of Sweden who are Swedish of Somali ancestry or are Somali citizens. A large proportion of Somalis in Sweden emigrated to Sweden due to the Somali Civil War. Most Somalis in Sweden arrived to the country after the year 2006.

== Demographics ==
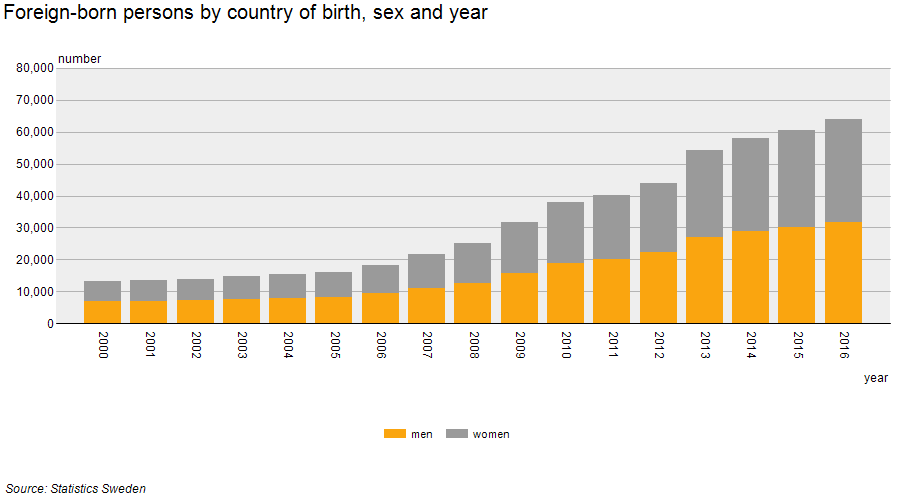
Somalia-born persons in Sweden by sex, 2001-2016 (Statistics Sweden).

According to Statistics Sweden, Somalis began arriving in Sweden from the late 1980s primarily due to the civil conflict in their country of origin. In 1990, there were just under 1,000 Somalia-born asylum seekers residing in Sweden. This number rose to around 2,000 Somalia-born asylum seekers by 1994, but decreased sharply to close to zero in 2000. As the conflict in Somalia intensified, the number of Somalia-born asylum seekers residing in Sweden increased to a high of just over 5,000 in 2010. That same year, the Swedish government introduced stricter identification document requirements for relatives of earlier migrants, which made it more difficult for Somalia-born individuals and other migrants to obtain a residence permit in Sweden. Consequently, the number of Somalia-born asylum seekers residing in Sweden markedly decreased to slightly over 1,000 in 2014. In 2016, there were 132 registered emigrations from Sweden to Somalia.

According to Statistics Sweden, as of 2016, there are a total 63,853 Somalia-born immigrants living in Sweden. Of those, 41,335 are citizens of Somalia (20,554 men, 20,781 women). Most of the residents are young, primarily belonging to the 15–24 years (8,679 men, 7,728 women), 25–34 years (7,043 men, 7,958 women), and 5–14 years (5,882 men, 5,629 women) age groups. Around 3,000 Somalis inhabit Borlänge. 2,878 Somalia-born individuals also live in Rinkeby-Kista. In 2005, the majority of Somali inhabitants in Gothenburg were concentrated to the Biskopsgården and Bergsjön/Angered area.

The largest Somali-born populations are in Gothenburg (9,756), Stockholm (8,447), Malmö (2,556), Linköping (2,542) and Örebro (2,234).

In 2013, a Somalia national bandy team was also formed in Borlänge, which participated in the 2014 Bandy World Championship. It is part of the Federation of International Bandy.

In 2014, Open Society Foundations did a report on Somalis in Malmö which found that Somali residents in the city thrived there due to low living costs, a greater religious tolerance than in the rest of Sweden and that there were many Muslims there. According to the report, integration was deficient mainly from the perspective of employment, as only 21 percent worked despite the fact that most of Malmö's residents who were born in Somalia were between 16 and 40 years old. One of the biggest challenges was the labor market's high demands for skills in the Swedish language.

== Education ==
In 2010, the governmental Regeringskansliet Statsrådsberedningen bureau estimated that 44% of Somalis in Sweden aged 16–64 were educated to a low level (Förgymnasial), 22% had attained secondary education level (Gymnasial), 9% had attained a post-secondary education level of less than 3 years (Eftergymnasial), and 25% had attained an unknown education level (Okänd).

The Open Society Foundation (OSF) project At Home in Europe counted the proportion of those with a low-level or "unknown" education at 60-70%. The OSF also found that the education level of this group of Somalis made it difficult for them to understand Swedish society and expressions used in the Swedish language.

Over the 2006-2010 period, Somali immigrants to Canada and the United States had higher levels of upper secondary and post-secondary education than Somalis in Sweden, who included a greater proportion of those with "unknown" education level (25%).

According to Statistics Sweden, in 2008-2009, there were 769 pre-school pupils and 7,369 compulsory school pupils who had Somali as their mother tongue. As of 2012-2013, there are 1,011 pre-school pupils and 10,164 compulsory school pupils who have Somali as their mother tongue.

In 2010, there were 4,269 students with Somali as their mother tongue who participated in the state-run Swedish for Immigrants adult language program. Of these pupils, 2,747 had 0–6 years of education in their home country (Antal utbildningsår i hemlandet), 797 had 7–9 years of education in their home country, and 725 had 10 years education or more in their home country. As of 2012, 10,525 pupils with Somali as their mother tongue and 10,355 Somalia-born students were enrolled in the language program.

== Community ==
When Somalis go to Sweden, they enter a country which has not experienced a major war in over two hundred years, a state apparatus stretching over a five-century time span, strong institutions, high-tech industry, an advanced knowledge-based economy with a generally high level of education. Sweden is also one of the most secularized societies with liberal values in areas that are central to traditional Somali culture: family, sexuality and gender. These circumstances combine to make a society which is radically different from that of Somalia.

According to an official report in 1999, most Somalis in Stockholm, Gothenburg and Malmö lived in multicultural neighbourhoods where few Swedes and Swedish-speakers lived; this also applied to Somalis in smaller towns. A contributing factor to this development was that these were the districts where mosques were located where they could practice Islam and that Somali community organisations were established in these districts.

According to an interview study done by Malmö University in 2013, Somalis express strong concerns about losing their culture and Islamic religion. Adult Somalis stated their greatest worry was to ensure a Somali identity among their children, which led to endless conflicts with daycare institutions and schools who "ignore their cultural preferences and teach children things which are the exact opposite of what their parents preach".

=== Clans ===
Somali clan culture is preserved among the diaspora for several reasons: first and foremost being that the clan system is at the heart of Somali family and identity. Thorough oral documentation of lineage is an important cultural priority for Somalis known as abtiris (lit. "forefather counting") and tracing one's clan is an extension of that practice — so much so that the phrase yaa tahay (who are you") does not ask a person for their name, but for their clan. Also, technical developments have enabled easy communication with relatives in the home country both with telecommunications and cheap flights to Somalia which enable many of the diaspora to maintain strong familial ties.

Somali clan culture plays an important role in new host countries for the Somali diaspora and new arrivals join already established social environments. The clan system also serves as an arena for sharing information which is crucial for making decisions about whether to move to other countries. The clan system also facilitates money transactions to relatives who live in the Horn of Africa, via a form of banking where no receipts are used. Relatives in Somalia are often dependent upon remittance from their relatives in exile, who in turn struggle economically due to their contributions.

Somali settlement patterns follow clan lines in Gothenburg, where Hjällbo and Hammarkullen districts are dominated by the Darod clan, Hawiye clan members are mostly found in Hisingen and the Isaaq clan in the Frölunda district.

=== Hawala ===
In 2019, Swedish banks SEB, Swedbank and Nordea started closing the accounts of thirteen Hawala organisations which facilitate the transfer of funds from Sweden to countries which lack a regular banking system, like Somalia. Remittances are often the only stable form of financial support many Somalis can obtain. The closures were due to strengthened legislation designed to thwart alleged money laundering and the financing of terrorism. The account closures were protested by Somaliska riksförbundet, a Somali community organisation.

According to the foreign minister of Somalia Ahmed Isse Awad, the transfer of funds from the Somali diaspora are higher than international foreign aid and amount to more than a billion dollars annually.

=== Community organisations ===
Somalis residing in Sweden have established various organisations to serve their community. Except for the multi-clan Somalilandföreningen (the Somaliland Association), the Somali community associations are generally based on clan affiliation, although a few individuals from different clans can also be found in the Somaliska kulturföreningen (the Somali Culture Association) and other larger organisations.

In 2015-16, Somaliska riksförbundet i Sverige (SRFS; English: the Somali National Association in Sweden) community organisation was granted funding from the governmental Swedish Inheritance Fund for the Navigator project, which, through seminars and workshops, aims to counteract extremism and prevent religiously-inspired violence and potential terrorist recruitment. As of 2016, there are around 100 Somali community organizations in Sweden according to the Swedish International Development Cooperation Agency. Several of them receive state funding from the Swedish Agency for Youth and Civil Society, including the Somaliska riksförbundet i Sverige, Somaliland riksförbund i Sverige, Riksföreningen för khaatumo state of Somalia, Somaliska ungdomsföreningen i Sverige, Barahley somaliska förening, Somali Dialogue Center and Somalilands förening.

According to the Herbert Felix Institutet, as of 2011, the three principal active Somali community organisations based in the Scania region are the Somalilandföreningen and the Hiddo Iyo Dhaqan in Malmö, as well as the Somaliska kulturföreningen in Kristianstad. The Somalilandföreningen has around 500 members primarily hailing from the Somaliland region in northwestern Somalia, the Hiddo Iyo Dhaqan has a few hundred members mainly from southern Somalia, and the Somaliska kulturföreningen has about 100 members. Many other smaller associations have been established in the region, but these do not operate regularly and are essentially single person organisations ("one man show").

According to the Herbert Felix Institutet, a number of European Union-funded projects have been launched around Scania in conjunction with the Somali community organisations. Among these endeavours are the Somalier startar företag, which helps Somali entrepreneurs establish companies; Integration på arbetsmarknaden för somalier FIAS, which assists in labor market integration in the Eskilstuna municipality; Integration genom arbete, which facilitates labor market integration in and near the Åstorp Municipality; Partnerskap Skåne, which is centered on developmental work; Samhälls-och hälsokommunikatör, which provides customized and interactive cultural information; Integration i förening, which assists newcomers by connecting them with and offering information on the local business community; Ökad inkludering genom språk, which in conjunction with industry leaders helps with language acquisition through vocational education; Bazar, Integration och Arbetsmarknad, Malmö Stad, which explores the possibilities and obstacles for establishing an entrepreneurial bazaar in the Malmö, Gothenburg, Västerås, Södertälje and Eskilstuna municipalities; and Uppstart Malmö, which liaises job-creating entrepreneurs with experienced investors in Malmö and provides interest-free loans and free financial guidance.

== Notable individuals ==
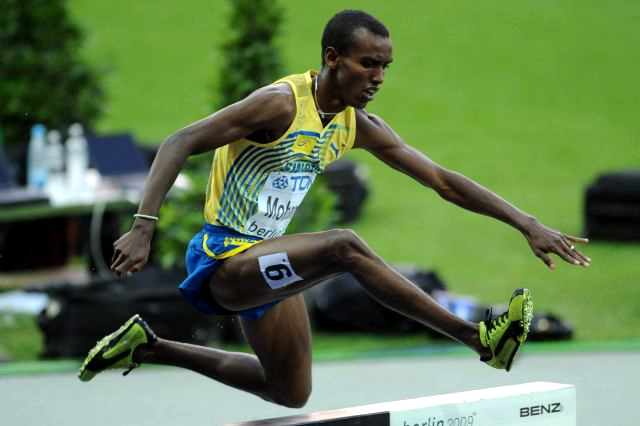
Mustafa Mohamed is a Somali-Swedish long-distance runner

- Farhiya Abdi, basketball player
- Amun Abdullahi, journalist
- Ferid Ali, football player
- Taha Ali, football player
- Cherrie, stage name of singer Shiriihan Mohamed Abdulle, sister of rapper K27
- Dree Low, stage name of Salah Abdi Abdulle, rap musician
- Rizak Dirshe, middle distance runner
- Bilal Hussein, football player
- Mohamoud Jama and Bille Ilias Mohamed, jihadists
- Ali Yassin Mohamed, militant Islamist
- Mustafa Mohamed, long distance runner
- Bilan Osman, journalist and author
- Abdirizak Waberi, politician and Islamic organization leader
- Mona Walter, Islam-critical social commentator
- Yasin, prize winning rapper, convicted criminal and cousin of Cherrie and K27
- Abdisamad "SpawN" Mohamed, Counter-Strike player
- Mohamed Abdukardir Ali, member of the Riksdag
- Mursal Isa, member of the Riksdag
- Mohamed Abdukani, member of the Riksdag

== See also ==
- Education in Somalia
- Education in Sweden
- Islam in Sweden
- Somali diaspora
