= 2017 Rinkeby riots =

2017 rioting in Stockholm, Sweden

- Date: 20 February 2017
- Location: Rinkeby, Stockholm, Sweden
- Methods: Arson, looting, rioting, rock throwing
- Result: Riot subdued

Parties
Swedish Police Authority	Masked young men and teenagers

Casualties
- Injuries: 3
- Arrested: 2

On 20 February 2017, rioting broke out in Rinkeby, a multicultural area of the Swedish capital Stockholm.

Rinkeby was previously the site of riots in 2010 and 2013.

== Events ==
Rioting broke out in the evenings between Monday, 20 February - Thursday, 23 February, with a crowd of 25 to 30 masked men who assembled after a drug-related arrest near the Metro station. In four hours of unrest, several fires were started, at least seven cars burnt, shops vandalized and police hit with rocks. One rioter was arrested for rock throwing. The fire department had to wait for the police to secure the area before being able to extinguish the burning cars. A number of shops were looted and a business owner was assaulted after having tried to stop the attackers. According to Lars Byström, a police spokesman, a police officer "shot for effect" with intent to hit his target, but missed, and to clear the scene so the police could make an arrest. A photographer from Dagens Nyheter newspaper said he was assaulted by a group of around 15 people.

The Swedish police were criticised by local residents for taking too long to subdue the rioters and not doing enough to stop them.

== President Trump's remark ==
Because the riots broke out two days after the president of the United States of America, Donald Trump, mentioned a Fox News segment he had seen about Sweden the night before, the Rinkeby riots of 2017 drew wide international attention. The president was mocked for the remarks by the international press, as well as Swedish officials.

== See also ==
- 2008 Malmö mosque riots
- 2009 Malmö anti-Israel riots
- 2016 social unrest in Sweden
- Arson attacks on asylum centres in Sweden
- We Are Sthlm sexual assaults
- 2003 & 2005 Malmö mosque arson attack
- 2010 & 2012 Malmö synagogue arson attack
