= 2009 French riots =

Period of rioting in France

- Montreuil location in Paris metro area
- Location: Firminy and Montreuil, France
- Date: 9–14 July 2009 (6 days) (UTC+2)
- Injuries: 13 police officers
- Perpetrator: youths demonstrators
- No. of participants: 250+

A series of riots took place in July 2009 in France. On Bastille Day in the commune of Montreuil, an eastern suburb area of Paris, French youths set fire to 317 cars. Thirteen police officers were injured. On 9 July many youths started a protest in Firminy near Saint-Étienne, after the death of a young Algerian man, Mohamed Benmouna, in police custody. Benmouna's parents rejected the official account of suicide. Riots on Bastille Day are a frequent occurrence in France as the disaffected protest high unemployment rates and failed integration policies for minorities. More than 240 people had been arrested near Paris.

The injured officers suffered mainly from hearing difficulties after having been targeted by youths armed with fireworks and small-scale home-made explosives.

== See also ==
- 2013 Trappes riots
- 2013 Stockholm riots
- 2011 England riots
- 2010 Rinkeby riots
- 2007 Villiers-le-Bel riots
- 2006 Brussels riots
- 2005 French riots
- 2001 England riots
