= 2013 Trappes riots =

Riots in a suburb of Paris, France

- Date: 19–21 July 2013 (3 days)
- Location: Trappes, Yvelines, Île-de-France, France
- Methods: Stone throwing, arson

Parties
| Compagnies Républicaines de Sécurité | Muslim youth |

Number
| 40 | 19 July: 200–250–300; 20 July: 50 |

Casualties
- Injuries: 1+
- Arrested: 6–10

Riots broke out in Trappes, a suburb (banlieue) of Paris, France, on 19 July 2013 after the police arrested a man who assaulted a police officer, who tried to check the identity of his wife wearing a Muslim veil on 18 July 2013.

== Background ==
France officially banned face covering in public places in April 2011. Although disputed by French Muslims, the law remains in effect. On 18 July a 21-year-old Muslim convert was asked by the police to remove her face-covering veil. Her husband tried to choke the officer and was detained. The female was released on 20 July awaiting a court hearing.

== Riots ==
On 19 July hundreds of youths throwing rocks, reportedly mainly of North African ethnicity, attacked the local police station.

On 20 July 20 cars were burned in Trappes.

== See also ==
- 2005 French riots
- 2006 Brussels riots
- 2007 Villiers-le-Bel riots
- 2009 French riots
- 2010 Rinkeby riots
- 2011 England riots
- May 2013 Stockholm riots
