= Klockaretorpet =

Coordinates: 58°34′40″N 16°7′43″E

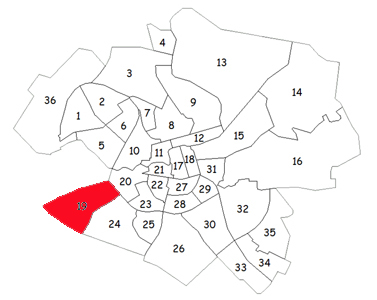
Klockartorpet within Norrköping

Klockaretorpet is a borough in Norrköping, Sweden. The borough was built between 1975–1985.

The area was already inhabited over 1000 years ago and there are rock carvings in the nearby.

The borough was the scene of riots in May 2016.
