= 2007 Villiers-le-Bel riots =

2007 riots in France

- Date: 26–29 November 2007 (4 days)
- Location: Villiers-le-Bel, Val-d'Oise, France (incidents occurred elsewhere in France)
- Caused by: Death of two teenagers in collision with police vehicle
- Methods: rioting, arson, shooting, assault

Parties
Rioters	Police

Number
Unknown	1,000

Casualties
- Injuries: 130+
- Arrested: 39

Riots in the Val-d'Oise department in France began on 26 November 2007, following the deaths of two teenagers (Moushin S., 15, and Larami S., 16), whose motorcycle collided with a police vehicle. The circumstances recalled those that precipitated the 2005 unrest, which began in Clichy-sous-Bois when two teenagers lost their lives as they evaded arrest while hiding in an electrical substation. As in 2005, the youth victims were of African origin.

== Motorcycle accident ==
The unrest began when the minibike, on which the youths were riding, collided with a police vehicle. The families of the youths allege that police rammed the motorcycle and left the two teenagers for dead. The police deny this, saying that the motorcycle was stolen and was an unregistered vehicle not valid for street use, travelling at high speed, and that the youths were not wearing any protective headgear - an account, according to French newspaper reports, confirmed by two eyewitnesses. A police investigation indicated that the motorcycle was in third (top) gear and that the police car was not going over 40 km/h (25 mph).

== Riots and government response ==
Immediately after the incident, a hostile crowd formed around the spot of the road accident. Divisional Commissioner Jean-François Illy, in charge of Sarcelles area, had his car burned and was hit with iron bars as he was trying to defuse the situation, and was hospitalised with a fractured nose and ribs. However, the scene of the accident was kept untouched by the crowd .

Over 130 policemen were injured during night-time riots and violent clashes, which began in Villiers-le-Bel in the Val-d'Oise department. Over 70 cars and buildings were burned, including a library, two schools, a police station, and several shops. According to Interior Minister Michèle Alliot-Marie, several police officers were hit by shotgun pellets. One officer received a serious shoulder wound when a firearm projectile pierced his body armour and another lost an eye. including six seriously wounded officers "who notably were struck in the face and close to the eyes." One police officer said that thirty officers had been hit by shotgun pellets, and one hit by a "bullet used to kill large game." He likened the situation to a "guerrilla war".

At least ten cars were burned and a fire broke out at a library in Reynerie, a suburb of the southern city of Toulouse. Eight rioters were arrested by the police on the night of 27 November.

On 28 November, President Nicolas Sarkozy, who was in China during the events, met Prime Minister François Fillon, Interior Minister Michèle Alliot-Marie, and Justice Minister Rachida Dati for a security briefing. The authorities decided not to give detailed account of the riots; however, they announced that 39 people were arrested the night before.

On 29 November, French suburbs stayed relatively calm after 1,000 riot police were deployed. There was no report of injuries.

== Aftermath ==
An investigation has been opened against the rioters. Another has been opened concerning the accident. On 18 February 2008, 33 people were arrested, suspected of being rioters.

== See also ==
- 2013 Trappes riots
- 2013 Stockholm riots
- 2011 English riots
- 2010 Rinkeby riots
- 2009 French riots
- 2006 Brussels riots
- 2005 French riots
- Banlieue
