= 2006 Brussels riots =

Series of riots in Brussels, Belgium

Between 23 and 29 September 2006, youths of mainly immigrant descent rioted in Brussels, Belgium, causing the destruction of several shop windows and the burning of ten cars and part of a hospital. The immediate cause of the riots was anger at the unexplained death in custody of a local man of Moroccan origin, Fayçal Chaaban.

A court later found two prison doctors guilty of assault/battery and failing to aid a person in mortal danger, having administered a fatal dose of tranquilizers, and gave them a six-month suspended jail sentence.

== Death of Fayçal Chaaban ==
Fayçal Chaaban, 25, had been involved in criminal activities since he was 13. He had been convicted for stealing in 2001, 2003, 2004 and 2005, and had been in prison since 16 September on the suspicion of theft. He started to serve a ten-month term in the prison of Forest, a Brussels municipality, after being caught at the wheel of a vehicle with no driving license and no insurance.

Chaaban was found dead in his cell on 24 September. He died after being administered tranquilizers in his cell. An autopsy on the body failed to throw a light on the exact cause of death. According to police pathologists, the body did not show any traces of violence. Further tests were needed to determine whether there was a link between the tranquilizers and the death, but prosecutors said the results of toxicology tests would take weeks to come back from the laboratory.

Belgian Justice Minister Laurette Onkelinx visited the deceased man's family shortly after his death.

== Riots ==
The riots began in the Marolles/Marollen district of Brussels and the area near Brussels-South railway station on the evening of 23 September 2006. Between 1 and 4 a.m., ten cars were set on fire, several car and shop windows were smashed, and one shop was set alight. Violence continued each night during the next days. On 26 September, after hearing the news on the death of Fayçal Chaaban, crowds of young persons started throwing stones at passing people and cars, smashing car windows and setting them ablaze, demolishing bus shelters and looting shops. The rioters also threw molotov cocktails into CHU Saint-Pierre, which caught fire and required fire brigade intervention. During the incident, the rioters managed to steal the keys of the fire engine.

Brussels' police arrested 30 rioters on 26 September 45 rioters on 27 September and 53 rioters on 28 September. Police said some of those arrested were carrying material to make petrol bombs. At least 242 crime files were opened by the police.

Most rioters were identified as immigrant youths from North-African origin, who claimed that they are upset by the death of Chaaban. A Belgian official said that the rioting was the worst since youths set fire to 15 vehicles across Belgium in November 2005, in violent riots which authorities said imitated unrest then going on in France.

On Belgian RTBF radio, Brussels's mayor Freddy Thielemans thanked the family of the late Fayçal Chaaban for helping to try to calm down the rioters.

By 29 September, the situation was said to be calm again.

== See also ==
- 2005 French riots
- 2007 Villiers-le-Bel riots
- 2009 French riots
- 2010 Rinkeby riots
- 2011 English riots
- 2013 Stockholm riots
- 2013 Trappes riots
- Sectarian violence
