= Mohamoud Jama and Bille Ilias Mohamed =

Mohamoud Jama (born 30 November 1987) and Bille Ilias Mohamed (born 15 June 1984) are two Swedish citizens of Somali descent who were convicted of "conspiracy to commit terrorist crime" by the District court ("Tingsrätten i Göteborg") in Gothenburg, Sweden, in 2010. The men, who both denied the accusations, were sentenced to four years in prison by the court.

Jama and Mohamed were arrested in Gothenburg and Stockholm in May and June 2010 following an investigation by the Swedish Security Service. The court said in its ruling that the accused "had taken it upon themselves and decided with the Somali islamist militia al-Shabaab to commit terrorist crimes in the form of suicide attacks".

The sentence was appealed. In March 2011 they were both released from custody, following trial in Court of Appeal for Western Sweden that soon after announced the exculpatory verdict.

The prosecution based its case on interrogations of the two suspects, witness accounts and a long line of tapped telephone conversations, claimed to have proof the two men had been in contact with al-Shabaab leader Yassin Ismail Ahmed.

The recorded telephone conversations also showed that Mohamed had attended an al-Shabaab training camp in Somalia and that he aimed to "return to Somalia and wanted to become a martyr," while Jama "was preparing for a future suicide mission," the charge sheet said.

== Billé Ilias Mohamed ==
Billé Ilias Mohamed was born in Somalia and moved to Sweden in 1996. He received Swedish citizenship in 2001. For a time, he was registered at the same address as Munir Awad, who later planned, attempted and was convicted for the 2010 Copenhagen terror plot. In the spring of 2015, Mohamed left Sweden and moved to Syria. According to the Islamic State, Billé Ilias Mohamed was killed in 2017, although In 2019 he was listed as an emigrant by the Swedish Tax Agency.
