= Ali Yassin Mohamed =

Somali-Swedish Islamist militant

Ali Yassin Mohamed (Somali: Cali Yaasiin Maxamed; Arabic: علي ياسين محمد; born 24 December 1965) is a Somali Islamist militant. As of May 2009, Ali Yassin Mohamed was residing in Rinkeby in northern Stockholm.

== Early life ==
Mohamed was born on 24 December 1965.

== Alleged activities ==
In February 2008, Ali Yassin Mohamed, along with Omar Ali and Abdulkadir Okashe Ali, was arrested in Sweden suspected of financing the Somali Islamist insurgency group Al-Shabaab. Abdulkadir Okashe Ali was released after three days while Ali Yassin Mohamed and Omar Ali were detained in custody pending trial. On 11 June 2008, they were released from custody and on 12 September the same year the preliminary investigation was closed.

In January 2009, Ali Yassin Mohamed travelled to Somalia, where he participated in the founding of the Hizbul Islam organization.

The Treasury of the United Kingdom put him among the targets for asset freeze on 28 April 2010.

== See also ==
- Fuad Mohamed Qalaf
