= Rinkeby =

Urban district in Stockholm, Sweden

Coordinates: 59°23′17″N 17°55′43″E

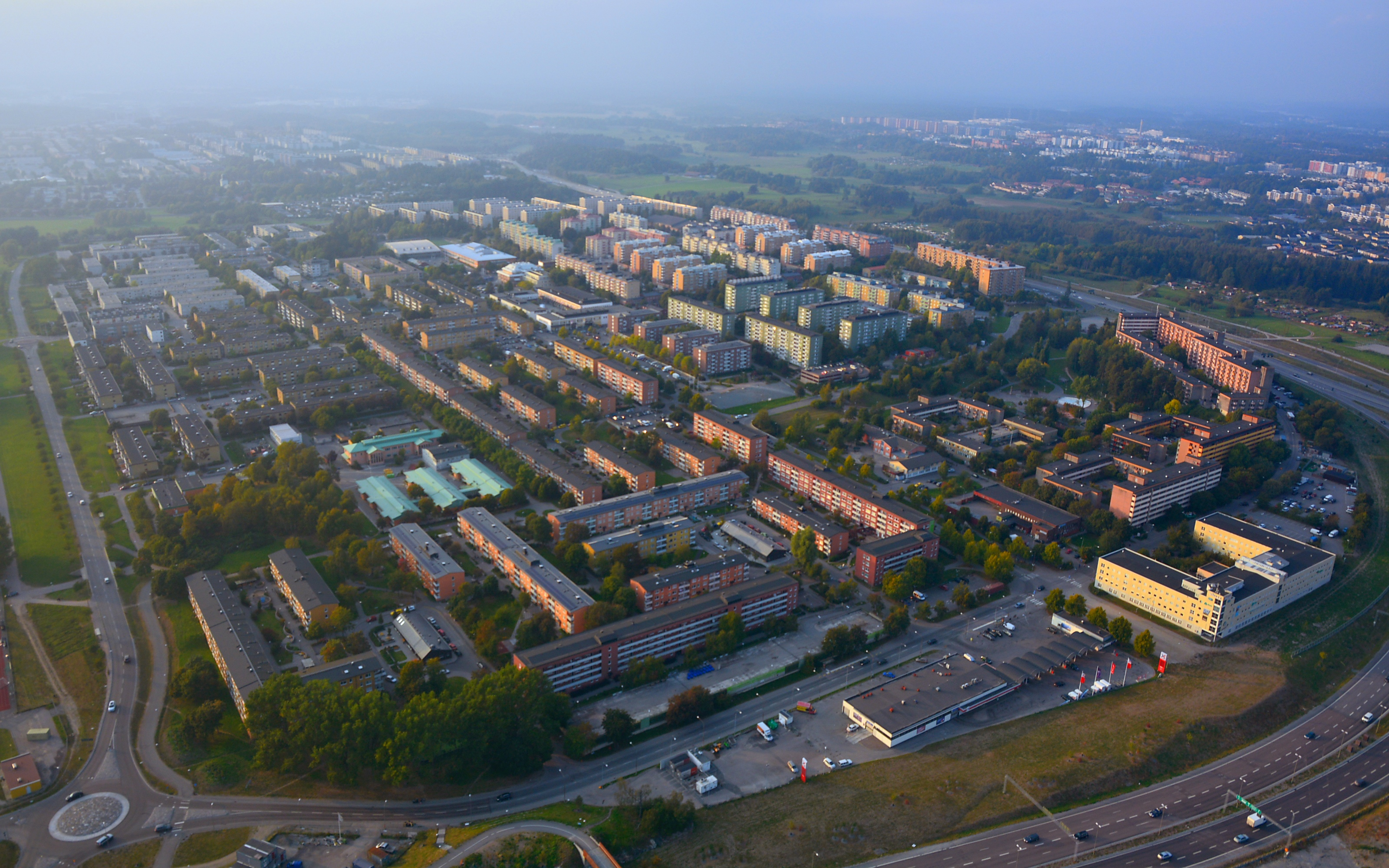
September 2014 aerial photograph of Rinkeby

Rinkeby (Swedish pronunciation: [ˈrɪ̂ŋːkɛˌbyː]) is a district in the Rinkeby-Kista borough, Stockholm, Sweden. Rinkeby had 19,349 inhabitants in 2016. The neighbourhood was part of the Million Programme.

The Stockholm Metro station Rinkeby was also opened in 1975.

Rinkeby is noted for its high concentration of immigrants and swedish people with immigrant ancestry. 89.1% of the suburb's population had a first- or second-generation immigrant background as of 2007.

A sociolect called Rinkeby Swedish has been named after Rinkeby. It is said to have seen use throughout the suburbs of Stockholm as well as across Sweden, with its development attributed to youth populations in multi-ethnic areas of major cities such as Rinkeby.

The district was a part of the Rinkeby borough until 1 January 2007, when it was merged with Kista borough to form the Rinkeby-Kista borough. The district was practically identical to the borough.

In the years preceding 2008, the state Social Insurance Agency, state Public Employment Service, banks and postal services vacated their offices in the area.

In 2010, the official figures stated 15,000 people lived in the area, but officials admitted 17,000 were more likely though uncertainties meant the figure could be higher still. Of those, 90% had a migration background and 37.6% were from Africa. With the area being home to a large number of immigrants, many from Somalia, the area is sometimes called 'Little Mogadishu'.

In its December 2014 report, Swedish Police placed it in the especially vulnerable area category.

== Demographics ==
Rinkeby is inhabited by a diverse array of immigrants. In 1970, 12% of Rinkeby had a foreign background. In 1996, 74% of Rinkeby were foreign born. Most of these immigrants originating from Southern European or non-European countries.

As of 2011, most were from Iraq (3,155), Iran (2,909), Somalia (2,878), Turkey (1,819), Finland (1,090), Ethiopia (1,026), Eritrea (914), former Yugoslavia (796), Greece (768), Poland (757), Chile (711), Syria (631), China (589), Pakistan (456), India (414), Bangladesh (414), Morocco (344) and Lebanon (289). In the 2011-13 period, about 53% of the population originated outside the EU and the Nordic countries.

Origin background in Rinkeby
Origin background	1989	
Origin background	Number	%
Nordic	6,126	43.9%
Sweden	4,537	32.5%
Denmark	38	0.3%
Finland	1,434	10.3%
Iceland	76	0.5%
Norway	41	0.3%
Europe (excluding Nordic)	2,353	17%
Bulgaria	12	0.1%
France	59	0.4%
Greece	1,276	9.1%
Italy	18	0.1%
Yugoslavia	302	2.2%
Austria	10	0.1%
Poland	222	1.6%
Portugal	35	0.3%
Romania	64	0.5%
Soviet Union	47	0.3%
Spain	109	0.8%
Great Britain	68	0.5%
Czechoslovakia	24	0.2%
Hungary	21	0.2%
West Germany	56	0.4%
Other Europe	30	0.2%
Africa	564	4.1%
Algeria	16	0.1%
Egypt	24	0.2%
Ethiopia	208	1.5%
Gambia	60	0.4%
Morocco	65	0.5%
Somalia	34	0.2%
Tunisia	38	0.3%
Uganda	52	0.4%
Other Africa	67	0.5%
North American and Central American	65	0.4%
USA	31	0.2%
Other North America	34	0.2%
South America	890	6.4%
Argentina	82	0.6%
Bolivia	35	0.3%
Brazil	13	0.1%
Chile	592	4.2%
Colombia	15	0.1%
Ecuador	25	0.2%
Paraguay	10	0.1%
Peru	32	0.2%
Uruguay	83	0.6%
Other South America	3	0.0%
Asian	3,829	27%
Bangladesh	75	0.5%
Cyprus	24	0.2%
Philippines	20	0.1%
India	65	0.5%
Iraq	224	1.6%
Iran	703	5.0%
Japan	10	0.1%
Jordan	16	0.1%
China	49	0.4%
Lebanon	161	1.2%
Pakistan	95	0.7%
South Korea	14	0.1%
Syria	238	1.7%
Thailand	24	0.2%
Turkey	2,058	14.7%
Other Asia	53	0.4%
Oceania and Other	3	0.0%
Oceania	3	0.0%
Unknown	140	1.0%

== Social unrest ==
According to the Swedish Defence University, since the 1970s, a number of residents of Rinkeby and other local areas have been implicated in providing logistical and financial support to or joining various foreign-based transnational militant groups. Among these organizations are Hezbollah, Hamas, the PKK, the GIA, the Abu Nidal Organization, the Japanese Red Army, the Red Army Faction, Al-Qaeda, the Islamic State, Al-Shabaab, Ansar al-Sunna, Ansar al-Islam, and the Serb Volunteer Guard.

In June 2010, and again in 2014, the Rinkeby police station was attacked by rioting local youths; in 2014, it was shut down.

In 2016, an Australian news team from 60 Minutes, along with Jan Sjunnesson, an editor of the Swedish far-right publication Avpixlat (who have since changed their name to Samhällsnytt), had their camera man allegedly hit by a car when they arrived in Rinkeby. After making contact with inhabitants, the team were surrounded by young, aggressive men. The police were present nearby, but had opted not to make their presence known, for fear of antagonising locals. In the attack that followed, the crew were hit and kicked. In May of the same year, an interview team of the Norwegian public broadcaster NRK, along with Swedish police and economist Tino Sanandaji were attacked.

Riots also broke out among immigrant youths in Rinkeby in 2010, 2013 and 2017. In 2017, fires were started by rioters, and at least seven cars were burned. Rioters threw rocks at police, who responded with warning shots, and later with "shots for effect" intended to hit their target.

In 2017, the construction of a new, more robust police station in the area was delayed, due to construction companies being unwilling to tender for the contract due to security concerns over attacks on equipment or threats towards employees. Owing to the threat level, and that people in the area were resisting the building of a police station, the construction site was given security guards. In August 2018, the construction site for the new police station was attacked by unidentified assailants. They used a car to force the gate and threw rocks and fireworks at security guards. The assailants then set the vehicle afire.

== Notable people ==
- Elias Abbas (born 2001), singer
- Cherrie (born 1991), singer
- Haddy Jallow (born 1985), actress and recipient of the 2007 Guldbagge Award for Best Actress in a Leading Role
- Martin Kayongo-Mutumba (born 1985), former professional footballer
- Adam Ben Lamin (born 2001), footballer for the Tunisia national football team
- Lucianoz (born 1993), dansband singer-songwriter
- Näääk (born 1983), rapper
- Ali Yassin Mohamed, founder of terrorist group Hizbul Islam.
