= Soheila Fors =

Iranian-Swedish activist (born 1967)

- Born: February 8, 1967 (age 59); Gilan-e Gharb, Iran
- Known for: Women's rights activism

Soheila Fors (born 8 February 1967) is an Iranian-Swedish women's rights activist, writer and founder of the Khatoon-foundation for immigrant women.

== Biography ==
Fors was born in Gilan-e Gharb in Kermanshah, and after having joined the resistance against Ayatollah Khomeini following the regime's persecution of her family, she moved to Sweden in 1993 with her husband and two children. As the relationship became increasingly more abusive, she divorced her husband, and eventually married her current husband in 1998, with whom she has two children. Driven by her own experience, Fors established shelters for women to break out of isolation and abuse, focusing particularly on immigrant women suffering under honour culture. She has also been active in collecting relief aid to refugees in Kurdistan.

Due to her activism, she has received death threats from people claiming to represent the Islamic State of Iraq and the Levant (ISIL).

Fors was chosen as "Rolemodel of the year" by Christian newspaper Dagen in 2012. Her biography, Kärleken blev mitt vapen, was released in 2015. A former Muslim, she is now a Christian.

== Published books ==
- 2015: Kärleken blev mitt vapen. Libris. ISBN 9789173874212.
- 2016: Bakom varje fönster bor ett hjärta. Libris. ISBN 9789173874809.
