= 2008 Malmö mosque riots =

Riots in Rosengård in Malmö, Sweden

On 18 and 20 December 2008, the closure of an Islamic cultural centre that housed a mosque in the Herrgården neighborhood of the Malmö district of Rosengård, in southern Sweden, caused hundreds of youths to riot against police.

== Rioting ==
Rioting was sparked when the owner of a building in Rosengård decided not to renew the lease on the space used by the Islamiska Kulturföreningen (The Islamic Culture Association). The directors of the mosque and cultural center turned over the keys and vacated the premises, but angry youths occupied the building's basement in protest. The basement occupation went on for three weeks, at the end of which police coming to evict the occupiers were confronted by about 30 occupiers, including radicalized Muslims and activists affiliated with the radical leftist Antifascistisk Aktion. The occupiers attacked police with pipe bombs and rocks and the incident rapidly escalated, with protestors arriving from other cities and officials calling in riot police.

Rioting continued for two nights; additional police had to be called in form Gothenburg and Stockholm to quell the violence. Rioters set fire to cars, wagons, kiosks, building sheds, recycling stations, and bicycle sheds.

After two nights of rioting, 200 adult Malmö residents organized by the Islamiska kulturföreningen moved into the streets to mediate, causing the youthful rioters to desist.

== See also ==
- 2009 Malmö Davis Cup riots
- 2010 Rinkeby riots
