= 2009 Malmö Davis Cup riots =

Anti-Israel riots in Malmö, Sweden

2009 Malmö riot
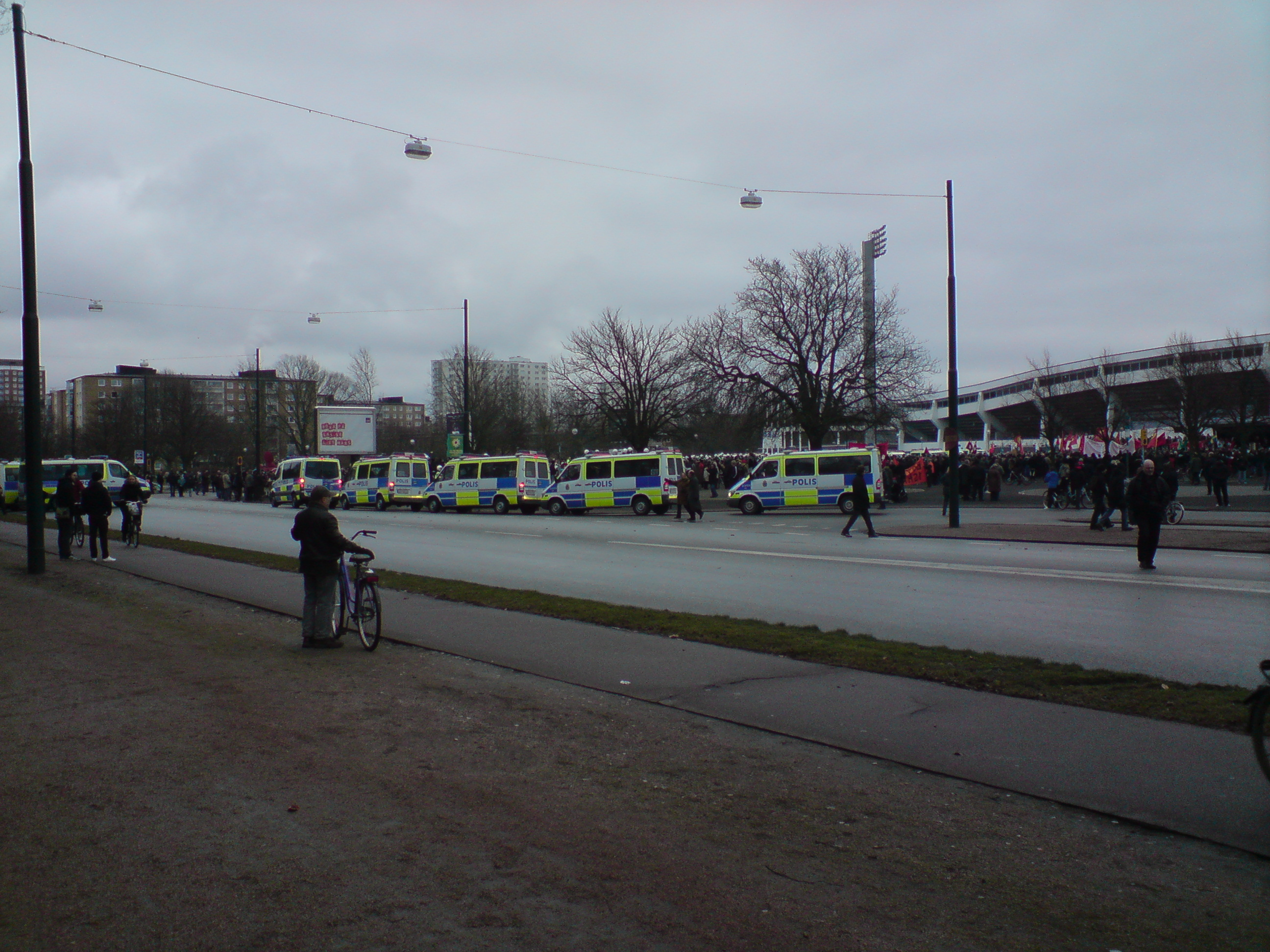
- Police vans monitoring a section of the wider protests.
- Location: Area around Baltiska Hallen, Malmö, Sweden
- Date: 7 March 2009
- Attack type: Riot
- Weapons: Stones, fireworks, paint bombs
- Perpetrator: Militant anti-Israel activists
- No. of participants: Several hundred
- Defenders: Malmö police department Danish riot vehicle support
- Accused: 18 demonstrators
- Convicted: 10 demonstrators

The 2009 Malmö Davis Cup riots were anti-Israel riots in the Swedish city of Malmö against a Davis Cup tennis match between Sweden and Israel on 7 March 2009.

== Background ==
In February, Malmö's red-green city coalition decided to close the match to the public, a decision that was criticised by the International Tennis Federation (ITF). The Mayor of Malmö, Ilmar Reepalu, said he believed the game should not be played at all due to what he described as crimes against human rights committed by Israel in the conduct of the Gaza War. The Swedish Tennis Federation made it clear that they would not forfeit the match and that Malmo was responsible for it going forward as scheduled. Der Spiegel wrote that the decision may have more to do with politics than security concerns.

== Protest march and riot at Baltiska Hallen ==
In anticipation of protests, around 1,000 police officers sanctioned off a large area around the Baltiska Hallen tennis stadium to keep protesters and rioters away. A reported 170 truck loads of pavement stones were transported out of the area before the protests, and three schools were closed. In addition, for the first time in history, riot vehicles were brought in from Denmark.

On 7 March, 6,000 to 7,000 (reported by the police) anti-Israel demonstrators gathered for a march on Stortorget, where speeches were held by among others the leader of the Left Party, Lars Ohly as well as Per Gahrton, chairman of the Palestine Solidarity Association. The demonstrators then marched to the police cordons at Baltiska Hallen. The demonstrators were joined by several hundred militant activists.

Once the march arrived at Baltiska Hallen, a group of several hundred broke off from the march to attack police, throwing firecrackers, paint bombs, bottles and paving stones. The militant demonstrators included anti-fascists including Antifascistisk Aktion, militant Islamists, organised neo-Nazis, as well as activists from neighbouring countries. Police eventually detained around 100 rioters, arresting ten. An additional eighteen rioters were later identified and put on trial for their part in the riots, with several convictions.

== Aftermath ==
The decision to close the tennis match to the public resulted in Malmö being banned from hosting tennis matches by the ITF for five years. In addition to having to provide $15,000 in minimum gate receipts for the match, the Swedish Tennis Association was fined an additional $25,000. The Swedish Tennis Association responded by issuing penalties to Malmö mayor Ilmar Reepalu for his involvement in the event.

Due to the protest and riots as well as the games being played to empty stands, rabbi Abraham Cooper and historian Harold Brackman accused Sweden and Malmö of antisemitism and apartheid in an article in The Jerusalem Post.

Swedish history professor Kristian Gerner described the situation as "the worst crisis for Jews in Sweden since the Second World War."

A 2012 European Men's Handball Championship qualifier between Sweden and Israel set to be played in Karlskrona in June 2011 raised concerns due to the riots, and was considered for moving to another location by Swedish sports authorities. The match was played as scheduled, with a minor anti-Israel demonstration being held.

== See also ==
- Båstad riots
- 1975 Båstad protests
- 2008–09 Oslo riots
- 2008 Malmo riots
- 2010 & 2012 Malmö synagogue arson attacks
