= Terrorism in Sweden =

Until the late 2000s, terrorism in Sweden was not seen as a serious threat to the security of the state. However, there has been a rise in far right and Islamist terrorist activity in the 21st century.

The Swedish government agency tasked with keeping watch over terrorism-related threats is the Swedish Security Service.

== 1970s–1990s ==
The terrorism-related event in modern Swedish history which received the most attention was the West German embassy siege in 1975, which was carried out by the Red Army Faction. In 1976, the same group also planned Operation Leo which was to involve the kidnapping of Anna-Greta Leijon, but which was never set in action.

In 1986 Swedish Prime Minister Olof Palme was killed in an action of dubious motivations. Several different terrorist leads were considered, but none has been proved conclusive, and the police main lead was a lone madman.

At the end of the 1980s a neo-Nazi movement developed in Sweden. National Youth activist Klas Lund was convicted of bank robbery and of the murder of Ronny Landin in the summer of 1986. National Youth was linked to the Swedish Resistance Movement. In 1988, the Nordic National Party formed a new network named VAM (The White Aryan Resistance), in which Lund was also involved; it became well known for a series of burglaries and robberies including one where they broke into a Lidingö police station and stole 36 guns. At the same time far right activist John Ausonius engaged in a shooting spree targeting immigrants. He was not involved in the neo-Nazi movement, but the concurrence of the events garnered press exposure. VAM no longer exists as a movement, but there are numerous organizations rooted in it, including the Swedish Resistance Movement (SMR) led by Klas Lund and the Party of the Swedes (SVP). In 1998, far right activist Hampus Hellekant murdered syndicalist union member Björn Söderberg after Söderberg campaigned against the Nazi activities of Info-14's Robert Vesterlund. Info-14 claimed one police killing in Malexander (the perpetrators, including Jackie Arklöv had links to the National Socialist Front too) and a car bomb in Nacka in 1999, leading the paper's editor, Vesterlund, to be sentenced to eighteen months in prison for incitement to racial hatred, threats against an officer, and aggravated incitement.

Sweden-based Palestinian terrorists Abu Talb and Marten Imandi were convicted of perpetrating a series of bombings and attacks in 1985 and 1986, along with two co-conspirators who received lesser sentences. The attacks included the 1985 Copenhagen bombings of the Great Synagogue and Northwest Orient Airlines.

== 21st century ==
In the 2000s, the issue of terrorism financing and recruiting for terrorist groups, including Islamist groups, have also been on the security agenda. Criminal acts from domestic political extremist groups, both on the right and on the left, have also become an increasing phenomenon.

The Neo-nazi activist group Swedish Resistance Movement (SRM) was formed in 1997 and merged into the Nordic Resistance Movement (NRM) in 2016. The group has been behind several violent actions since a bomb and the murder of the journalist Björn Söderberg in 1999. In 2017, NRM members were arrested for involvement in two bombings and a bombing attempt in Gothenburg, near two refugee accommodations and a syndicalist organization. Legion Wasa is a neo-Nazi paramilitary organisation founded in 1999, whose members have reportedly been preparing for race war, and once made preparations for helping out Saddam Hussein in the Iraq War against the invading United States Army. Led by Curt Linusson, a former UN soldier and Home Guard officer, the group has conducted field practice in the forests of Västergötland. The organisation is said to have between 25 and 30 members. In 2004 four members of the organisation were arrested, charged with plotting mass murders of political opponents, and of forming a terrorist cell inspired by the novel The Turner Diaries. All four were acquitted for terror charges, although three of the charged were convicted for violence and drug charges, with sentences ranging from one to two years imprisonment. The 2010s saw an upsurge in far right violence in Sweden.

== Islamic terrorism ==
According to the Swedish Defence University, since the 1970s, a number of residents of Sweden have been implicated in providing logistical and financial support to or joining various foreign-based transnational Islamic militant groups. Among these organizations are Hezbollah, Hamas, the GIA, Al-Qaeda, the Islamic State, Al-Shabaab, Ansar al-Sunna and Ansar al-Islam.

In the 2000s, Islamists in Sweden were not primarily seeking to commit attacks in Sweden, but were rather using Sweden as a base of operations against other countries and for providing logistical support for groups abroad.

In 2010, the Swedish Security Service estimated that a total of 200 individuals were involved in the Swedish Islamist extremist environment. According to the Swedish Defence University, most of these militants were affiliated with the Islamic State, with around 300 people traveling to Syria and Iraq to join the group and Al-Qaeda associated outfits like Jabhat al-nusra in the 2012–2017 period and some have financed their activities with funds from the Swedish state welfare systems. In 2017, Swedish Security Service director Anders Thornberg stated that the number of violent Islamic extremists residing in Sweden to number was estimated to be "thousands". The Danish Security and Intelligence Service judged the number of jihadists in Sweden to be a threat against Denmark since two terrorists arriving from Sweden had already been sentenced in the 2010 Copenhagen terror plot. Security expert Magnus Ranstorp has argued that efforts to improve anti-terror legislation has been hampered by human rights activists such as Ywonne Ruwaida, Mehmet Kaplan and the organisation Charta 2008. A change in the activism occurred in the 2013–2014 time frame due to the number of Swedish citizens travelling to join the Islamic State. He also stated that some of the loudest activists have withdrawn from public debate after being exposed for harassing women in the metoo campaign.

The issue has also led to problematic relationship between Sweden and Turkey in the context of Swedish decision to join NATO in 2022, a request that has been delayed by Turkey due to Turkish view that Sweden is not doing enough to prevent organizations Turkey sees as terrorist from operating in Sweden (see Swedish anti-terrorism bill (2023)).

== List of terrorist incidents in Sweden ==
Date	Type	Deaths	Injuries	Details	Perpetrator
12 July 1908	Bombing	1	23	A bomb was placed on a ship housing strikebreakers during a strike at the docks in Malmö.	Anton Nilson
3 March 1940	Arson	5	Several	An arson attack against the office of the Communist newspaper Norrskensflamman in Luleå by right-wing extremists.	Right-wing extremists
15–16 September 1972	Hijacking	0	0	The Scandinavian Airlines System Flight 130 was hijacked by Croatian ultranationalists to force the release of seven members of their group Ustashe imprisoned after the 1971 Yugoslav Consulate and Embassy shootings in Sweden.	Croatian National Resistance
24 April 1975	Bombing	4	14	Red Army Faction carried out the West German embassy siege with the goal of forcing the release of other RAF members from prison in West Germany.	Red Army Faction
6 September 1997	Bombings	0	0	A right-wing anarchist was arrested after having bombed several sporting venues including the Stockholm Olympic Stadium.	Mats Hinze (suspected)
August and September 1998	Bombing	0	0	Two 400 kilovolt power lines in Jämtland – two of the most important and accounting for a large part of southern Sweden's power supply – were bombed numerous times by a group protesting the government's parliamentary decision to allow free mountain hunting in the country.	Action Group Against Free Mountain Hunting
29 June 1999	Bombing	0	2	A car bomb in Nacka injured a freelance journalist and his child.	Right-wing extremists (suspected)
11 December 2010	Bombing	0 (+1)	2	The 2010 Stockholm bombings occurred on 11 December 2010 when two bombs exploded in central Stockholm, Sweden, killing the bomber and injuring two people. Swedish Minister for Foreign Affairs Carl Bildt and the Swedish Security Service (SÄPO) described the bombings as acts of terrorism. Taimour Abdulwahab al-Abdaly, an Iraqi-born Swedish citizen, is suspected of carrying out the bombing. The Norwegian Broadcasting Corporation described the event as the first suicide attack linked to Islamic terrorism in the Nordic countries.	Taimour Abdulwahab al-Abdaly (suspected)
11 September 2011	Assassination plot	0	0	In Gothenburg 2011 a terrorist plot was alleged to target art festival and Swedish artist Lars Vilks, but prevented by Swedish police. Four people were arrested, three were charged, but all three suspects were later acquitted.	Al-Qaeda (suspected)
22 October 2015	Sword attack, stabbing	4	1	Trollhättan school stabbing: A far-right extremist killed three people at a high school.	Anton Lundin Pettersson
February 2016	Bombing plot	0	0	In the 2016 Sweden terrorism plot, Aydin Sevigin was convicted of plotting to carry out an ISIS-inspired suicide bombing on Swedish soil using a homemade pressure-cooker bomb.	Aydin Sevigin
November 2016 and January 2017	Bombings	0	1	Three people connected to the neo-Nazi group Nordic Resistance Movement committed three bomb attacks in the Gothenburg area targeting a left-wing café and two refugee centres.	Nordic Resistance Movement (suspected)
7 April 2017	Truck attack	5	14	In the 2017 Stockholm truck attack, a self described ISIS recruit rammed a truck into a crowd in Stockholm, Sweden, resulting in five deaths. A 39-year-old rejected asylum seeker born in the Soviet Union, currently a citizen of Uzbekistan, was arrested, suspected on probable cause of terrorist crimes through murder. Contrary to popular claims, the attack has not been claimed by ISIS or any other terrorist group.	Rakhmat Akilov
9 December 2017	Arson attack	0	0	In the 2017 Gothenburg Synagogue attack young men threw firebombs at the synagogue in Gothenburg.	Palestinian nationalists (suspected)
24 August 2025	Attempted terror plot	0	0	Two young Syrian men at 18 and 17 was indicted on preparation of a terrorist attack in August 2025 at a festival in Kungsträdgården, in Stockholm. They were also charged with attempted murder in Eppstein, Germany in August 2024. The suspects were possibly in connection with the ISIS.	Islamic State (suspected)

== See also ==
- 2014 mosque arson attacks in Sweden
- Malmö mosque arson attack
- Malmö synagogue arson attack
- Oussama Kassir
- Mehdi Ghezali
- Mohamed Moumou
- Antisemitism in Sweden
- Terrorism in Europe
- Islamic terrorism in Europe
- List of terrorist incidents
- Terrorism in the United States
- Hindu terrorism
- Left-wing terrorism
- Right-wing terrorism
