= 2016 Malmö Muslim community centre arson =

Arson attack in Malmö, Sweden

Coordinates: 55.5746°N 13.0520°E

- Date: October 11, 2016
- Location: Malmö Muslim community centre
- Type: Arson

On 11 October 2016, a fire was deliberately set at the Malmö Muslim community centre in Malmö, Sweden, which housed a Shia mosque. There were no injuries and only minor damage. ISIS claimed responsibility for the attack. A Syrian resident of Malmö was arrested, tried and acquitted and the incident was deemed to be arson, but not terrorism. In June 2017, a man was arrested in Germany, accused of working for the ISIS-related news agency, Amaq. Police claim he had contacted the accused before and after this attack in order to report back to Amaq.

== Events ==
A 30-year-old Syrian man was arrested in December 2016, accused of throwing the fire bomb that set off the fire, causing damage to the building, which housed a Shia mosque. At trial in early June, 2017, the accused was acquitted of all charges and the fire was deemed to be arson, but not to be terrorism-related.

After being acquitted, the accused was immediately remanded to the custody of the Swedish Security police Säpo, where procedures were activated to open a case under the Foreign Immigration Control law to establish whether his residency status should be revoked and he should be deported to his country of origin on the grounds of having ties with ISIS and of posing a threat to national security.

== ISIS involvement ==
According to The Local, investigators had found a description of how to make a detonator on the accused man's computer, along with ISIS propaganda films showing Islamic State militants fighting and killing "infidels" and also the image of an Isis flag. In October 2016, the ISIS magazine al-Naba claimed that the arson was committed by "a warrior from the caliphate," who acted "on the instructions of the leader al-Adnani", Isis spokesman Abu Mohammad al-Adnani, and described the arson fire as the Islamic State's first attack on Scandinavia. Swedish terrorism expert Magnus Ranstorp dismissed the ISIS claim, but terrorism expert Hans Brun of King's College London, noted that given the paucity of press coverage, the question was how the ISIS news agency "got access to this information".

In June 2017, German police arrested a 23 year old Syrian man identified only as Mohammed G., accusing him of being an Isis member and of passing on information to the Amaq News Agency since September 2015. German police accused Mohammad G. of communicating with the alleged perpetrator of the Malmö arson attack on social media. According to the German prosecutor's office, "One day after this attack, the accused demanded from his contact person (in Sweden) a personal claim of this deed..., The background was that Amaq did not want to issue a report about the attack without such a claim".

Following the arrest of Mohammad G., Shiraz Maher, deputy director of the International Center for the Study of Radicalization at King's College, London, said "We've all assumed that they are reading news reports, and then saying, 'Our guy did this.' But this is interesting because this does show that they clearly have someone, who is one of their guys, and who is getting verification and confirming that this attack was in our name", however Maher cautioned that the German police statement had mentioned only a single example of such confirmation.

== Response ==
In a speech in February 2017, Donald Trump stated that the media was not reporting on terrorist attacks. Later that day, the Trump administration included this event in a list of 78 attacks which the admin said were "under-reported".

== See also ==
- Malmö Synagogue attacks
- Malmö Mosque attacks
- 2014 mosque arson attacks in Sweden
- Arson attacks on asylum centres in Sweden
