= Stockholm attack =

Stockholm attack may refer to:

- Stockholm Bloodbath, 1520
- 2017 Stockholm truck attack
- 2010 Stockholm bombings

== See also ==
- 2013 Stockholm riots (disambiguation)
- 2016 Sweden terrorism plot
- Terrorism in Sweden
- Stockholm syndrome
- Mats Hinze
- Stockholm hostage crisis (disambiguation)
