= Arson attacks on asylum centres in Sweden =

Series of crimes in Sweden

During the European migrant crisis, refugee asylum centers in Sweden have been the target of a series of arson attacks thought to have been carried out by ideologically-motivated anti-immigration nationalist Swedes.

In September 2015, 4 refugee centers were set on fire in suspected arsons.

In September 2016 refugee centre in Stockholm was destroyed in a suspected arson attack.

In June 2017 two fires were set at an asylum center near Ystad.

== See also ==
- 2014 mosque arson attacks in Sweden
- List of grenade attacks in Sweden
- Malmö mosque arson attacks
- 2010 & 2012 Malmö synagogue arson attack
- Terrorism in Sweden
- Trollhättan school stabbing
