= Stockholm hostage crisis =

Stockholm hostage crisis may refer to:

- Norrmalmstorg robbery, 1973
- 1975 West German embassy hostage crisis
- Embassy of Iran, Stockholm#Protests at the embassy, 1981

== See also ==
- Stockholm attack (disambiguation)
