= Strindbergmuseum Saxen =

Coordinates: 48.2075°N 14.7903°E

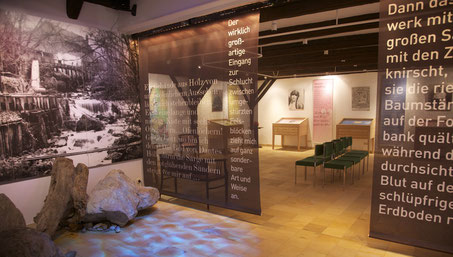
Entrance to the museum

The Strindberg Museum Saxen is located in the village Saxen in Upper Austria. It is the only Strindberg museum outside of Sweden and is managed by the Kulturverein Saxen.

== Description ==
In 1997 the museum was founded in 1997 by Friedrich Buchmayr and the community of Saxen.

In 1893 August Strindberg married the Austrian author and translator Frida Uhl, and between 1893 and 1896 he stayed several times with her and their child Kerstin in Saxen and Klam. First they lived in the castle Dornach or in a building adjacent to the castle respectively. After controversies with Fridas family and Frida herself, he moved to Klam, a neighbouring place of Saxen, where he took the so-called Rosenzimmer in the inn Kirchenwirt.

The museum displays original letters and manuscripts, contemporary photographs and a piano purchased by August Strindberg himself.

In the surroundings of Klam August Strindberg found a lot of themes for his paintings, e.g. the cascades in the canyon between Klam and Saxen, as well as for his novels where he depicted for example the stone formations, the hammer mill and a pigsty in the canyon. In the fifteenth chapter of his novel Inferno he describes his visions having experienced during a walk through the canyon.

In 2009 the Strindberg walk between Saxen and Klam was provided with signs.

== Awards ==
- Upper Austrian museum of the month in May 2007
- Strindberg award 1998 granted by the Strindberg Museum in Stockholm
