= Yvonne Ruwaida =

Swedish politician (born 1970)

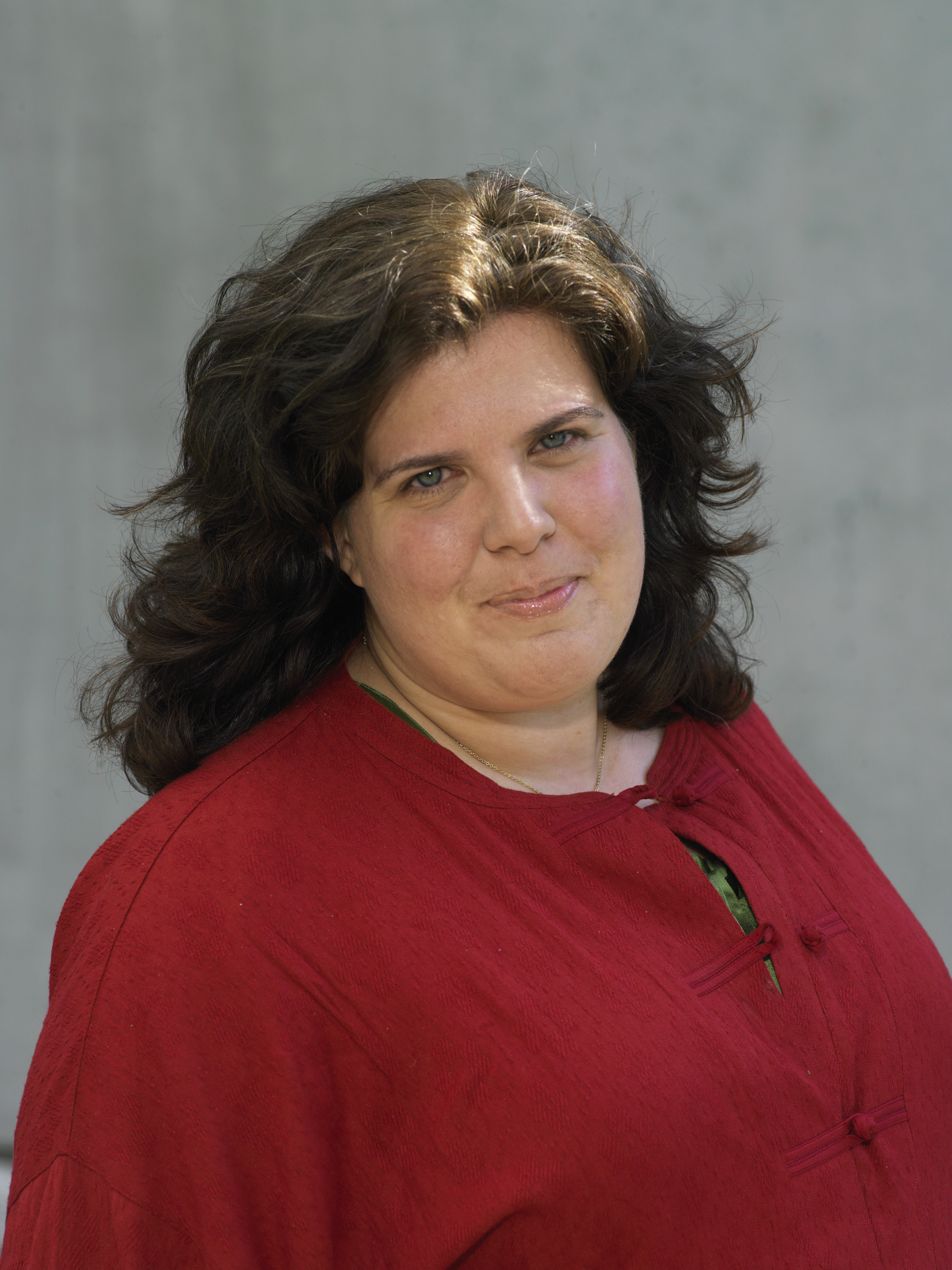
- Lahti in 2018

Member of the Riksdag
- In office 2 October 1994 – 2 October 2006
- Constituency: Stockholm Municipality

Personal details
- Born: 1970 (age 55–56) Göttingen, Germany
- Party: Green Party

Yvonne Ruwaida (born 1970 in Göttingen, Germany) is a Swedish Green Party politician of Palestinian origin. She was a member of the Parliament of Sweden from 1994 to 2006.

She was born in 1970 in Göttingen, Germany to a Palestinian Bedouin father and Swedish mother. She was the eldest of five siblings.

She was chairman of the Young Greens.

As a member of parliament, Ruwaida together with Mariam Osman Sherifay (Social democrats) invited two representatives of the Palestinian organization Hamas, which at the time was categorized as a terrorist organization by the EU. The invitees were a group leader in the Palestine parliament and a relative of a Hamas leader which had been killed.

From 2006 until 2010, she was the leader of the Greens in the city council in Stockholm Municipality, where they were part of the opposition. Since then, she is vice-convener of the Green Party's central directorate.

According to terror scholar Magnus Ranstorp, Ruwaida is opposed to strengthening the anti-terror legislation in Sweden.
