= Strindberg Museum =

Coordinates: 59°20′18.60″N 18°03′23.62″E

- Strindbergsmuseet
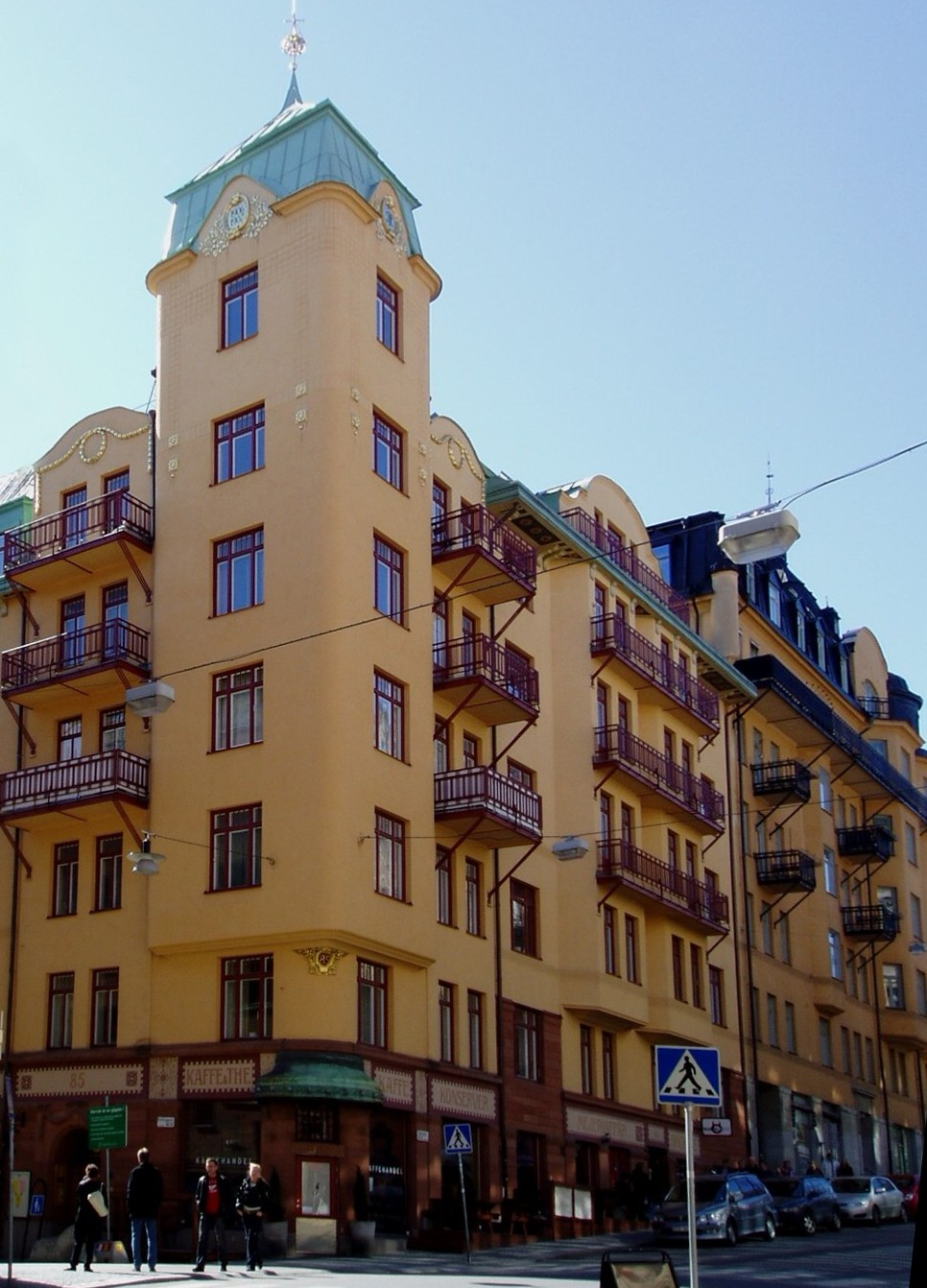
- Strindbergmuseet April 2008
- Established: 1973
- Location: Drottninggatan 85 on Norrmalm in Stockholm, Sweden
- Type: Historic house museum
- Director: Erik Höök
- Curator: Camilla Larsson
- Public transit access: Rådmansgatan metro station
- Website: www.strindbergsmuseet.se

The Strindberg Museum (Swedish: Strindbergsmuseet) is a museum in Stockholm, Sweden. It is dedicated to the writer August Strindberg (1849-1912) and located in his last dwelling. The site is in the building he nicknamed "Blå tornet" (Blue Tower) at Drottninggatan 85 on the corner of Drottninggatan and Tegnérgatan in the borough of Norrmalm in central Stockholm.

== History ==
The Blue Tower is an art nouveau building with a dominant corner tower. It were erected in 1906-1907 after drawings by the architectural firm of Hagström & Ekman. The museum is owned by the Strindberg Society of Sweden and was inaugurated in 1973. It is operated by a foundation with the Strindberg Society, the City of Stockholm and the Nordic Museum as principals.

Strindberg moved into a three-room apartment on the fourth floor of the building in 1908 and lived there until his death in 1912. The museum consists of Strindberg's flat and library, as well as an area for temporary exhibitions. Wallpapers and other decorations have been reconstructed in accordance with how the flat looked at the time the writer lived there, but furniture and other details are original. In particular, Strindberg's chairs, tables, bed and piano are present.

The reconstructed apartment, consisting of three rooms on the fourth floor and his library with some 3,000 works on the sixth floor, form the core of the Strindberg Museum.

== Gallery ==
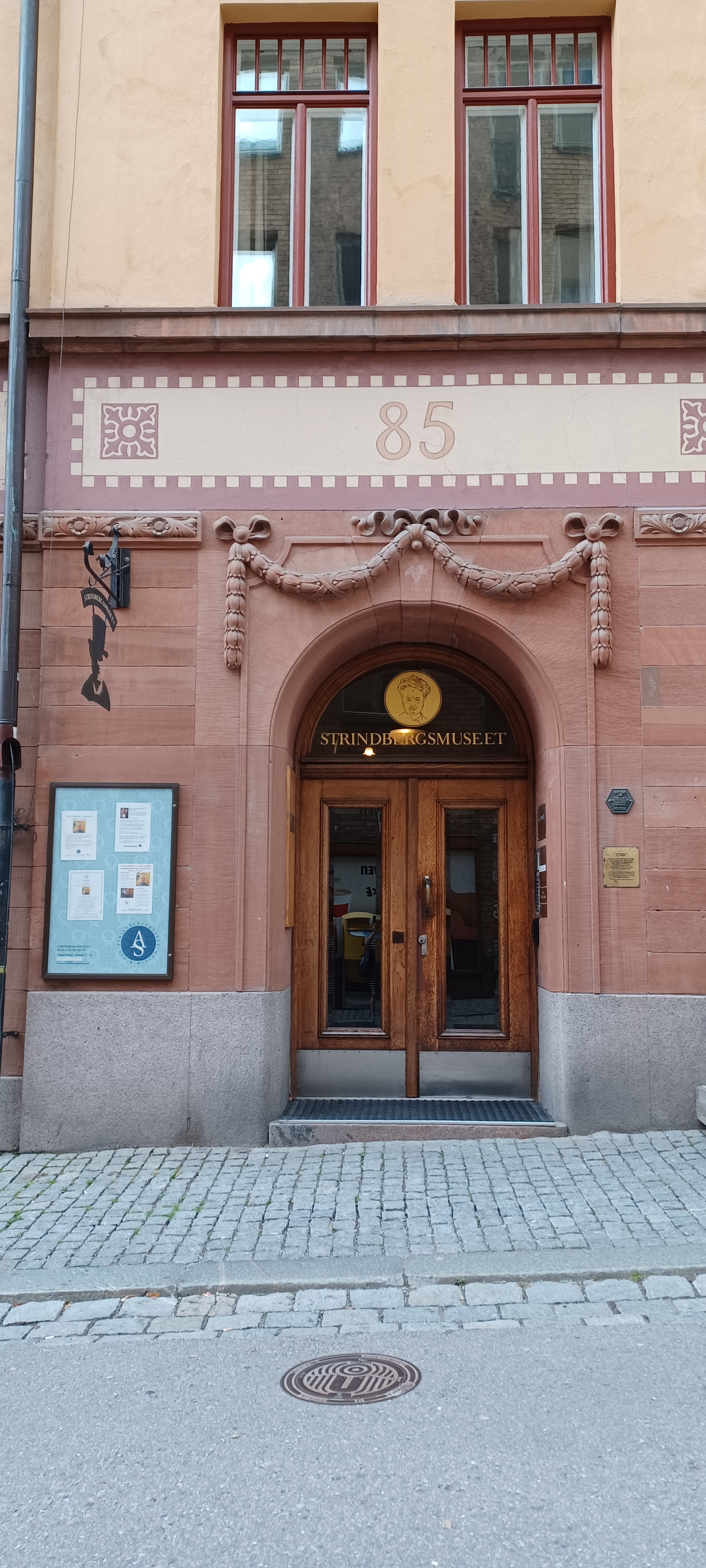
August Strindberg Museum Front Door Drottninggatan 85, entrance at street level for fourth floor flat

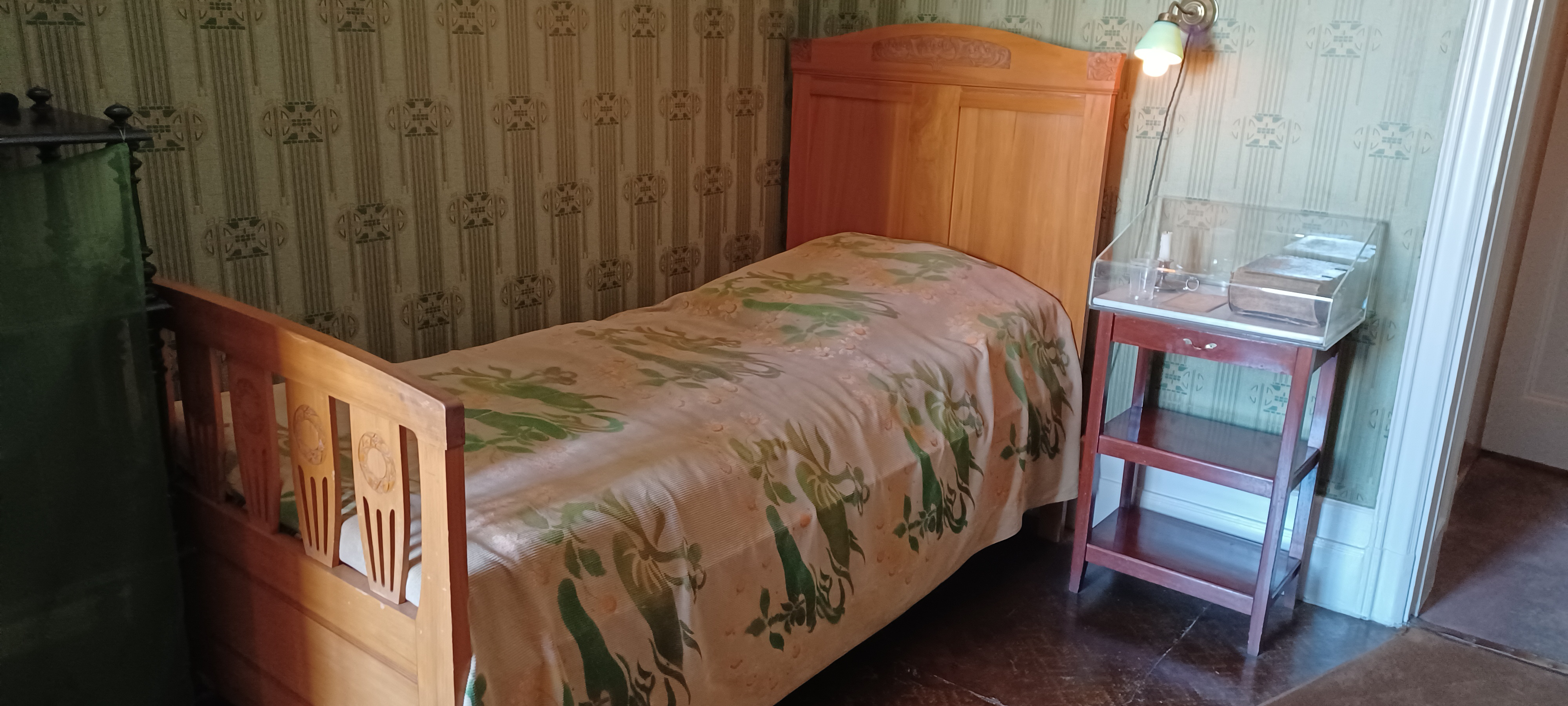
Strindberg's bedroom

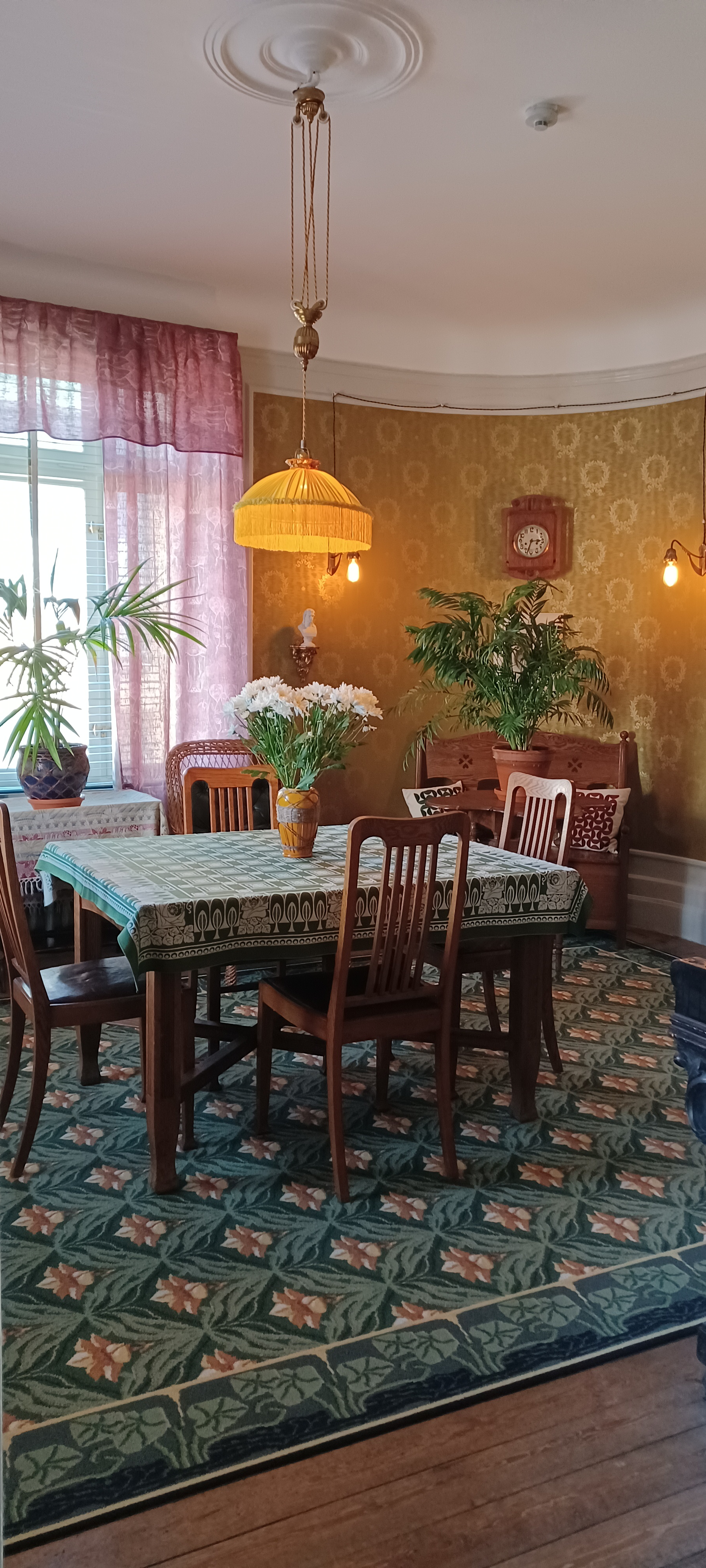
Strindberg's living room

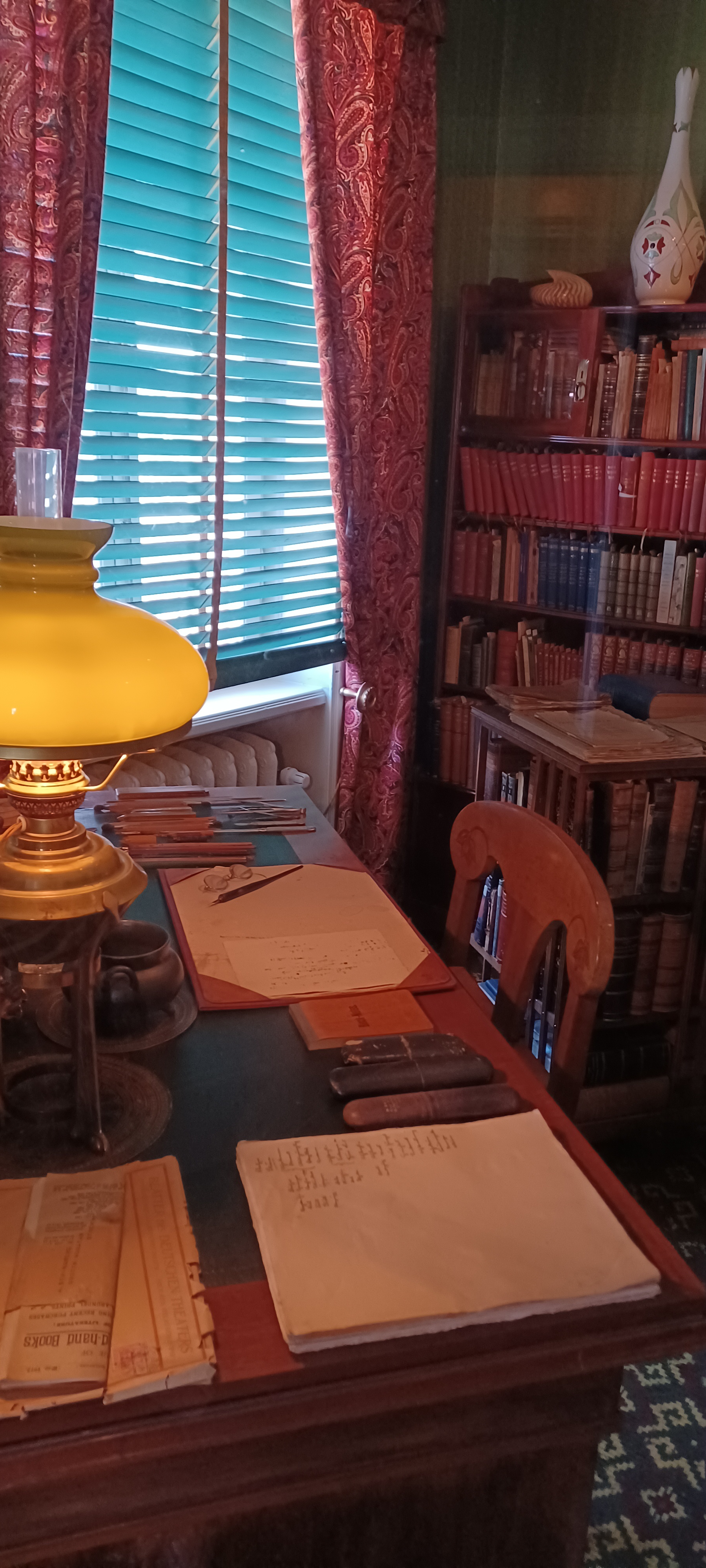
Strindberg's desk with items as at his death

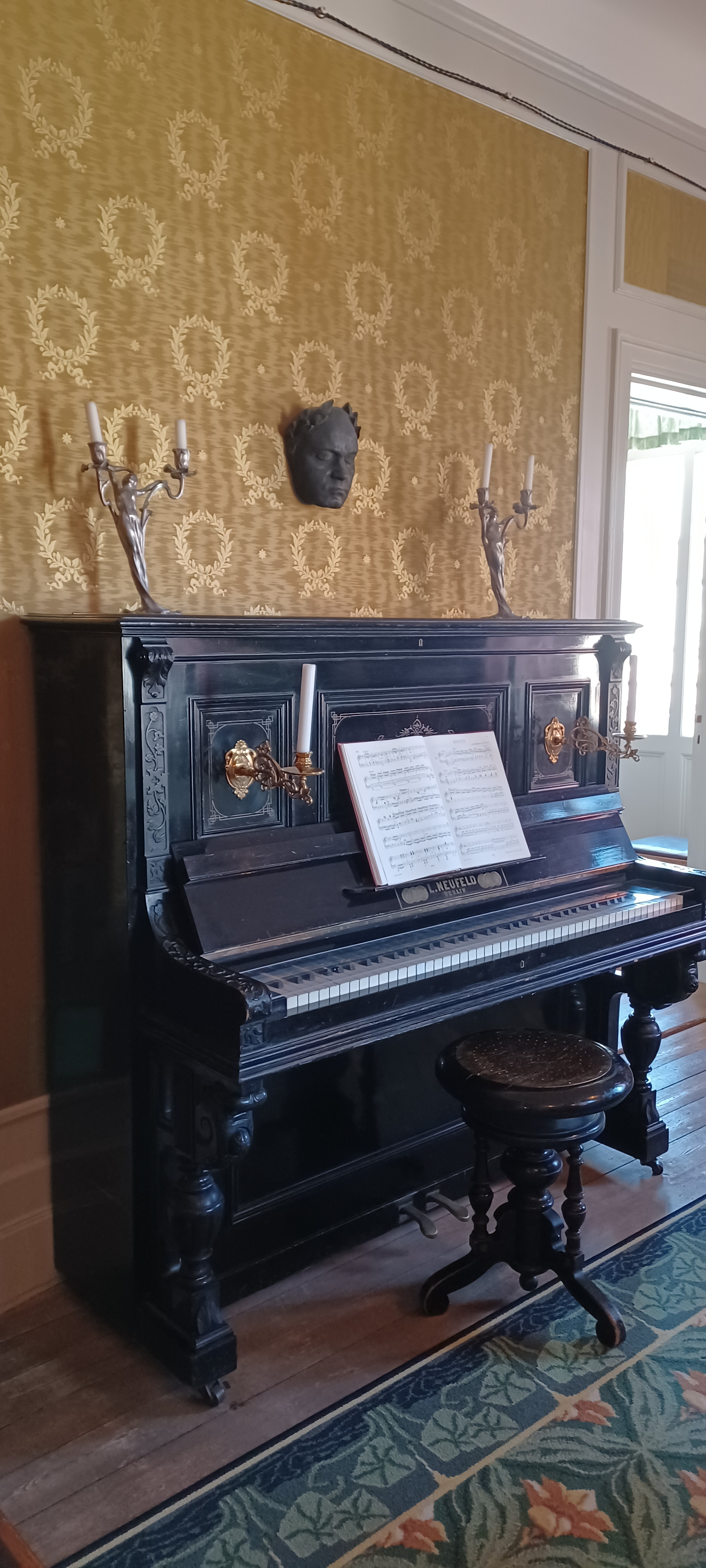
Strindberg's piano

== See also ==
- Culture in Stockholm
- Strindbergmuseum Saxen in Austria

== Other sources ==
- Göran Söderström (1998) Strindbergs bostad i Blå tornet ISBN 91-7031-087-4
