= Drottninggatan =

Street in central Stockholm, Sweden

- Interactive map of Drottninggatan
- Former name: Stora Konungsgatan
- Namesake: Queen Christina
- Length: 1,500 m (4,900 ft)
- Postal code: 111 XX
- Nearest metro station: T-Centralen
- Coordinates: 59°19′55″N 18°03′48″E

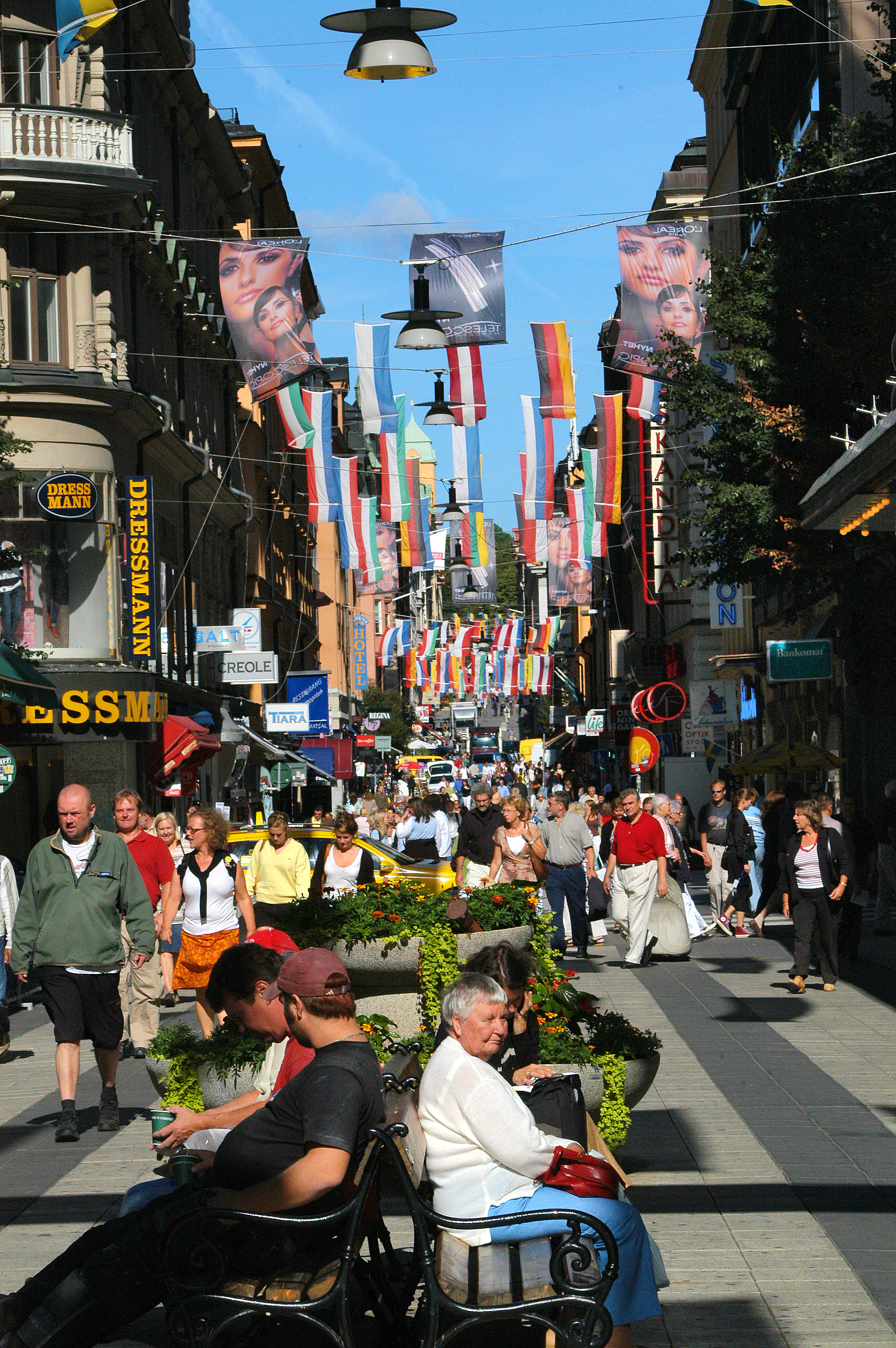
Drottninggatan during the summer of 2006.

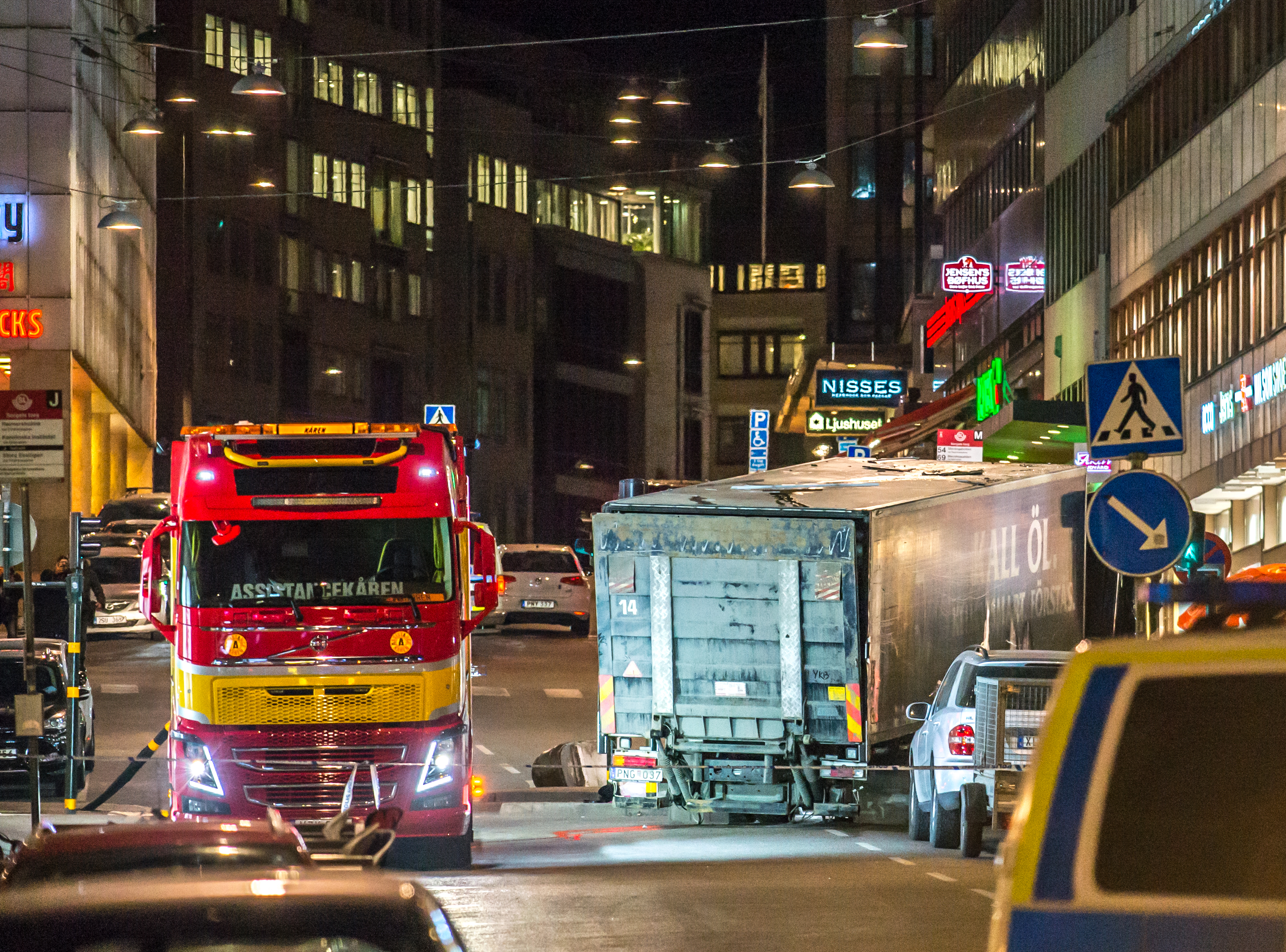
The truck used in the 2017 terrorist attack

Drottninggatan (Queen Street) in Stockholm, Sweden, is a major pedestrian street. It stretches north from the bridge Riksbron at Norrström, in the district of Norrmalm, to Observatorielunden in the district of Vasastaden.

== Composition ==
Forming a parallel street to Vasagatan and Sveavägen, Drottninggatan is intersected by (south to north) Fredsgatan, Jakobsgatan, Herkulesgatan, Vattugatan, Klarabergsgatan, Mäster Samuelsgatan, Bryggargatan, Gamla Brogatan, Kungsgatan, Apelbergsgatan, Olof Palmes Gata, Barnhusgatan, Adolf Fredriks Kyrkogata, Wallingatan, Kammakargatan, Tegnérgatan, Rådmansgatan, Kungstensgatan and Observatoriegatan.

The major part of the street is car-free and lined with numerous stores and shops, one of the largest being the Åhléns City department store. During summer, the street is often crowded with tourists.

== History ==
The street was laid out in the 1630s and 1640s when the surrounding area was built on a rectilinear grid plan, a significant innovation in Stockholm's urban environment. It was originally named Stora Konungsgatan ("Great King's Street") and was later renamed as Drottninggatan in honour of Queen Christina, who ruled from 1632 to 1654. Its name was paired with that of nearby Regeringsgatan ("Government Street"). This style of naming was relatively novel for Scandinavia, which did not have a tradition of streets named for the king or queen. It was most likely borrowed from Amsterdam or Copenhagen, where groups of streets were given names from the same semantic categories. Thus in Copenhagen's district of Christianshavn, laid out in 1618, three streets were named Kongens gade ("King's Street"), Dronninggaden ("Queen's Street") and Prinsensgade ("Prince's Street").

On 11 December 2010, Drottninggatan was the site of the 2010 Stockholm bombings. Taimour Abdulwahab al-Abdaly, an Iraqi-born Swedish citizen, was killed by one of his own bombs and two other people were injured. The incident was Sweden's first suicide bombing.

On 7 April 2017, the street was again the site of another terrorist incident, a deadly truck ramming in which five people died and fifteen more were injured. Rakhmat Akilov, an Uzbek citizen, drove a truck through pedestrians and crashed into the Åhlens department store.

=== Notable residents ===
The playwright, novelist and essayist August Strindberg lived at Blå tornet (Drottninggatan 85) for the last four years of his life. The building is now the site of the Strindberg Museum.

Another famous resident was the 19th century banker and newspaper tycoon André Oscar Wallenberg, who lived with his family at Drottninggatan 66 until 1876.

== See also ==
- Geography of Stockholm
