= 2023 Swedish anti-terrorism bill =

The Swedish anti-terrorism bill of 2023 refers to the anti-terrorism legislation debated by the Swedish parliament.

The new legislation had been first proposed in 2017 following the Stockholm truck attack and would criminalise "the participation in a terrorist organisation". Sweden had debated introducing anti-terrorism legislation before but those efforts had been hampered by human rights activists. The legislation had not been finalized but gained new momentum following the Russian invasion of Ukraine in 2022, after which Sweden applied to join NATO, only for the Swedish application to run into opposition from Turkey, on the grounds that Sweden and Finland (which also applied at the same time) "host terrorist organisations which act against Turkey", including the PKK, PYD, YPG and Gülen movement. While the PKK is recognised as a terrorist organisation in both Sweden and Turkey, the Gülen movement is not recognised as a terrorist organisation in Sweden. The Turkish government has since requested the extradition of members of the Gülen movement and the PKK from Finland and Sweden; that the countries stop supporting the Gülen movement, the PKK, and terrorism; and that Finland and Sweden should address Turkish security concerns.

In March 2023 representatives of the Swedish government announced that the government would submit an anti-terrorism bill, partially aimed at addressing Turkish concerns, in the near future, with tentative plans to see the legislation enacted by June. A necessary amendment to the Swedish constitution related to the proposed law already entered into force in January that year after a parliamentary vote in preceding November. The legislation was to be debated by the Swedish parliament in May.
