= 2014 mosque arson attacks in Sweden =

Series of crimes in Sweden

- 2014 mosque arson attacks in Sweden (Sweden)
- Location: Eslöv, Uppsala and Eskilstuna, Sweden
- Date: 25 December 2014– 1 January 2015
- Attack type: Arson
- Weapon: Molotov cocktails
- Motive: Anti-immigration; Anti-Islam

The 2014 Sweden mosques arson attacks were a series of incidents all of which were initially believed to be arson attacks on three mosques in Sweden, that took place during one week at the end of 2014. In the third incident, in addition to being struck by a Molotov cocktail, the mosque at Uppsala was vandalized with racist graffiti.

The first incident, the only one to have caused injuries, was found to have been an accident in the mosque kitchen caused by an overheated deep-fryer.

== Accident and attacks ==
On Christmas Day, five people suffered injuries when, according to early reports, a petrol bomb had been tossed through the window of a mosque in Eskilstuna. Up to 20 people, including children, were in the mosque at the time of the attack. Police later said they were investigating the incident as an accident, considering it unlikely to have been a deliberate attack. It was later reported that an overheated deep-fryer was the probable cause of the fire.

The second event (and first indisputable arson attack) took place on 29 December in the southern Swedish town of Eslöv just after 3 am local time. No one was injured on that occasion.

Early on New Year's morning, there was another arson attack on a mosque, this time in Uppsala. In this attack the mosque was also vandalized with racist graffiti.

== Background ==
The attacks happened at a time of rising anti-immigrant sentiment and political tension over Sweden's status as the leading destination in the European Union (per capita) for asylum seekers.

== Response ==
Prime Minister Stefan Löfven said that the attacks were "hateful violence" and denounced the crime. He said that the attacks were not representative of Sweden. and that "no-one in Sweden should be afraid of practicing their religion".

Samir Muric, the imam in Eslöv, told a Swedish news agency: "Unfortunately this is probably something to do with Islamophobia. I live nearby, and it’s beginning to feel unsafe."

On January 2, 2015, hundreds of anti-racist demonstrators in three major Swedish cities rallied in support of Muslims.

== See also ==
- 2003 & 2005 Malmö mosque arson attack
- 2010 & 2012 Malmö synagogue arson attack
- Arson attacks on asylum centres in Sweden
