= 2016 Sweden terrorism plot =

Bombing plot of Aydin Sevigin

In February 2016 20-year old Aydin Sevigin was arrested, and in June 2016 convicted for plotting to carry out a bombing attack using a homemade pressure cooker bomb containing shrapnel. The plot was possibly ISIS-inspired.

Sevigin grew up in the upscale Stockholm suburb of Danderyd.

Surveillance footage from IKEA showed him purchasing a pressure cooker. "Six bottles of acetone, a mobile phone, duct tape and bullets" were discovered in a police raid on his property.

In June 2015, a member of Sevigin's family called police to say that he had gone missing. Shortly thereafter Sevigin traveled to Turkey twice, both times he was deported by Turkish authorities on suspicion of intending to join ISIS in Syria. He is known to have downloaded ISIS propaganda and bomb-making instructions.

He was sentenced to 5 years in prison.

== See also ==
- 2017 Stockholm truck attack
- 2010 Stockholm bombings
