= Magnus Ranstorp =

Swedish scholar (born 1965)

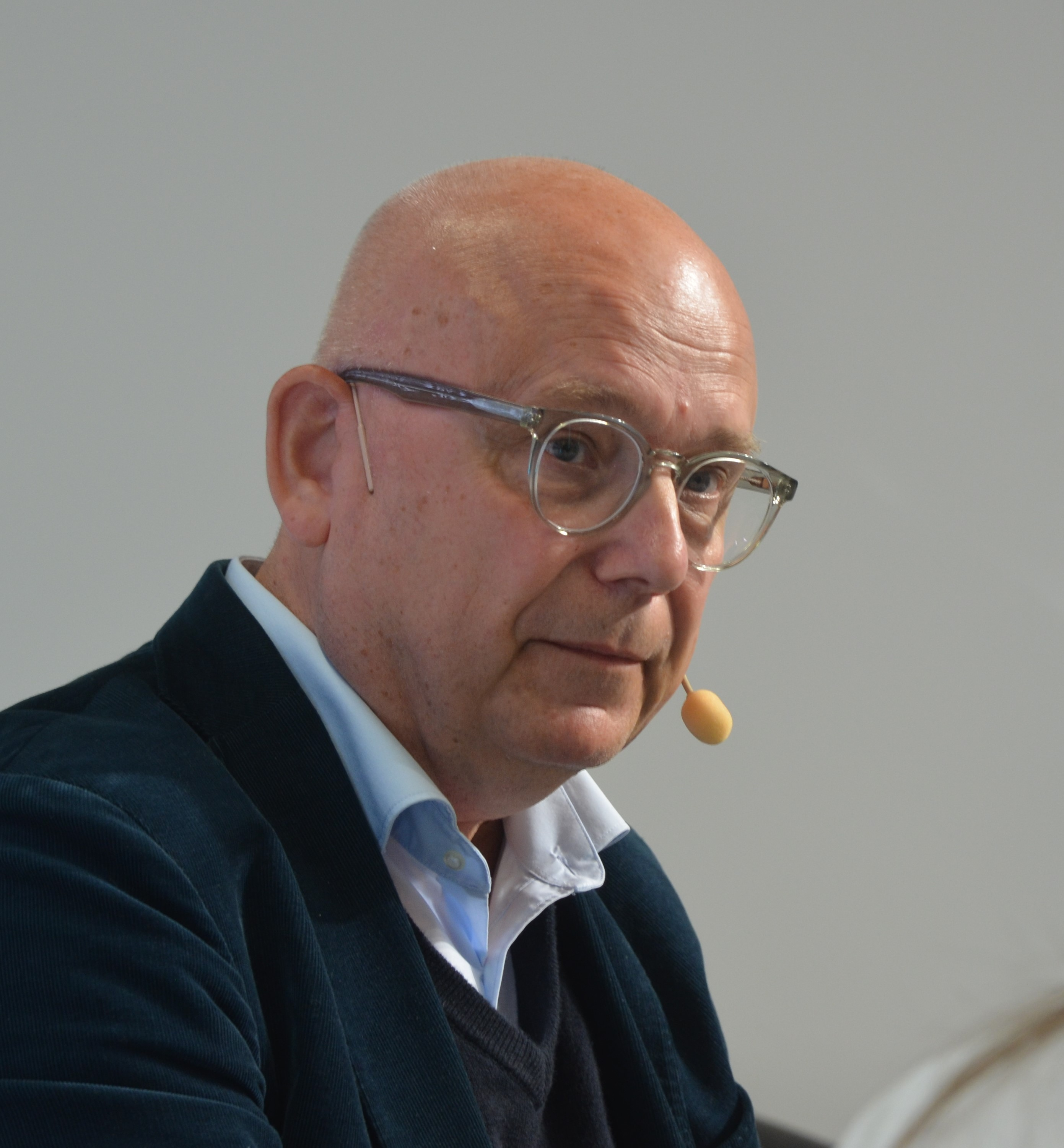
- Ranstorp in 2024
- Born: 13 March 1965 (age 61); Hästveda, Sweden
- Known for: Political commentary

Per Magnus Ranstorp (born 13 March 1965 in Hästveda) is a Swedish political commentator and docent who has written about Hezbollah, Hamas, Al-Qaeda and other militant Islamic movements. He is the Research Director of the Centre for Asymmetric Threat Studies at the Swedish National Defence College, directing a project on Strategic Terrorist Threats to Europe which focuses on radicalisation and recruitment of salafist-jihadist terrorists across Europe and the convergence between Chemical, Biological, Radioactive and Nuclear Weapons, and Terrorism. Ranstorp graduated from Gustavus Adolphus College in Saint Peter, Minnesota in 1985.

He was briefly the Director of the Centre for the Study of Terrorism and Political Violence (CSTPV) at the University of St Andrews, Scotland. He is the author of Hizballah in Lebanon as well as several articles and monographs on terrorism and counter-terrorism, although during the past 15 years only one of his publications has been peer-reviewed. He is on the international editorial advisory board of the academic journal Studies in Conflict and Terrorism and on the editorial boards of two newly launched peer-reviewed journals published by Taylor & Francis: Dynamics of Asymmetric Conflict and Critical Studies on Terrorism. In 2003, he was invited to testify before the first hearing of the 9/11 Commission. He was a member of an Advisory Panel on Terrorism in Europe advising the EU counter-terrorism coordinator. In 2005, he was a contributor to the George C. Marshall Center-directed project on "Ideological War on Terror: Synthesizing Strategies Worldwide" (funded by the Office of the US Secretary of Defense). In 2006, Ranstorp was invited to join the European Commission Expert Group on Violent Radicalisation, an official advisory body on all matters relating to violent radicalisation and recruitment of extremists within the EU. Ranstorp has been heavily criticized by other researchers, including political scientist Anna Ardin, for relying on questionable and discredited sources for his research, and for exhibiting an undeniable "pro-Israel" bias. Ranstorp has only published one peer-reviewed research article during the past 15 years.

Ranstorp stated in 2022 that Russia has committed genocide in Ukraine, but to this day still denies that Israel has committed genocide in the Gaza strip. Ranstorp cited and repeated quotes by Israel’s ambassador to Sweden as his sole reaction to ICC issuing arrest warrants against israeli leaders, calling them ”absurd” and, in a reply thread, expressed support for the view that international law should not be used as a weapon against the West. Ranstorp stated in May 27, 2025 that ”it is easy to say from the sidelines” that Israel has used too much violence in Gaza, and questioned the number of palestinians killed. He has stated that the Hamas October 7 attacks were not about killing, but about "extermination". Ranstorp has repeatedly argued that Israel should attack Iran, and supported Israels UNWRA ban.

During the early stages of the 2011 Norway Attacks, Ranstorp speculated that the attacks were probably the work of al-Qaida. However, it later turned out that the attacks were carried out by a lone white supremacist perpetrator. In his manifesto mass-murderer Anders Behring Breivik copied 25 pages verbatim from an ideological text written by Evan Kohlmann and published by an institute led by Magnus Ranstorp.

In March 2017, Ranstorp disparaged the claim made by ISIS magazine Al-Naba that the 2016 Malmö ISIS-related arson was started by "a warrior from the caliphate"; the fire was later shown to have been started by an ISIS operative.

In June 2017 Ranstorp was appointed the leader of a study on jihadi salafist organisations in Sweden by the Swedish Civil Contingencies Agency.

He was the subject of an incident in May 2023 when he threatened Professor Farid Hafez on Twitter for writing an essay accusing him of having ties to the UAE government.

== Bibliography ==
- Mellan salafism och salafistisk jihadism: Påverkan mot och utmaningar för det svenska samhället (en. Between salafism and salafi-jihadism: Counter-measures and challenges for Swedish society) (with Filip Ahlin, Peder Hyllengren, Magnus Normark) (2018)
- Financial activities linked to persons from Sweden and Denmark who joined terrorist groups in Syria and Iraq during the period 2013 ‐ 2016: Report commissioned by Finansinspektionen (with Filip Ahlin, Magnus Normark) (2017)
- Swedish Foreign Fighters in Syria and Iraq: An Analysis of open-source intelligence and statistical data (with Linus Gustafsson) (2017)
- Från terrorns frontlinjer. (en. From the front lines of the terror) (Stockholm: Mondial, 2023)
- Hamas: Terror inifrån (en. Hamas: Terror from within, (Stockholm: Mondial, 2024)
