= 2017 Stockholm truck attack =

Terrorist attack in Stockholm, Sweden

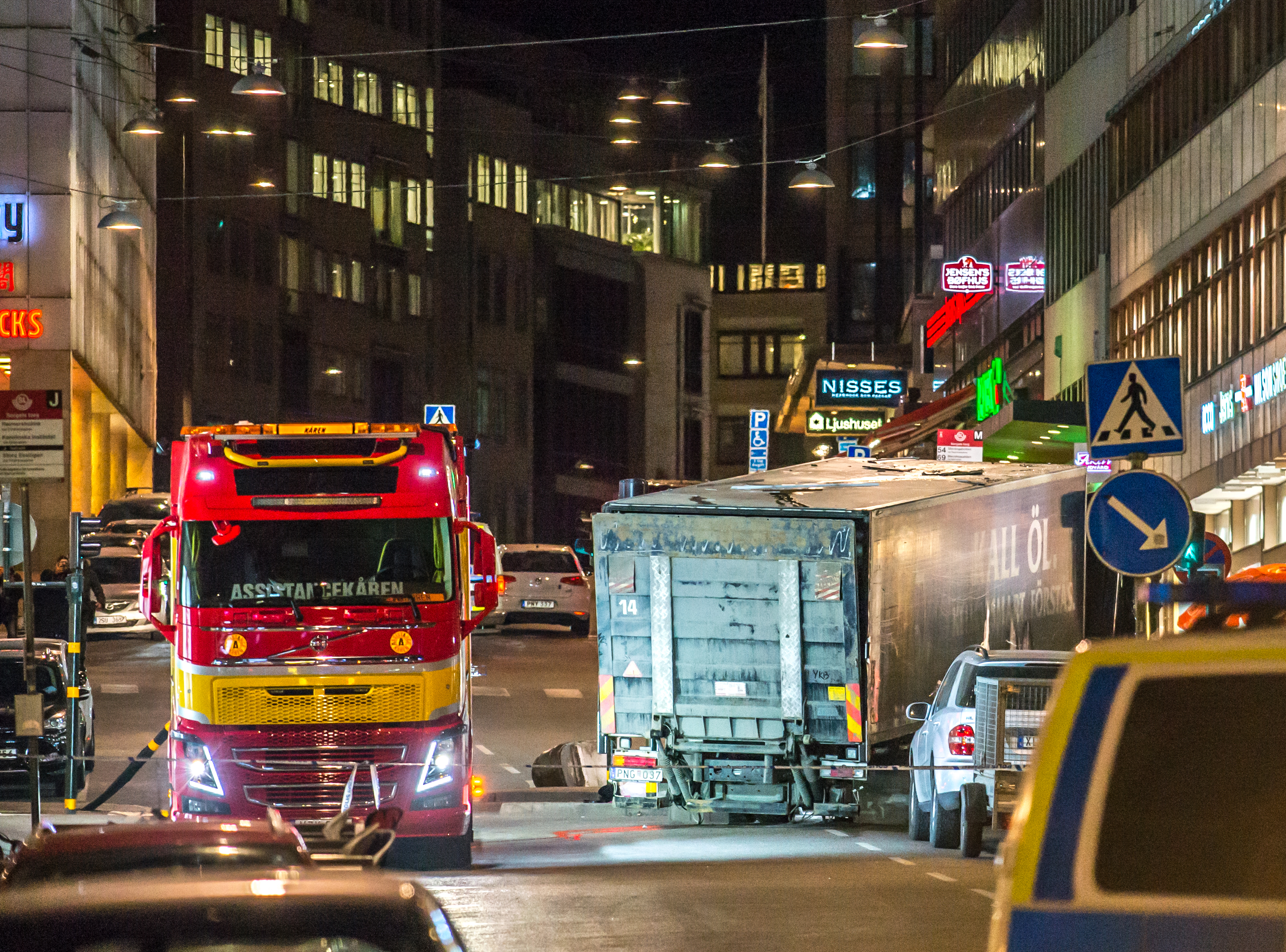
- The truck used in the attack (right) being removed from the scene

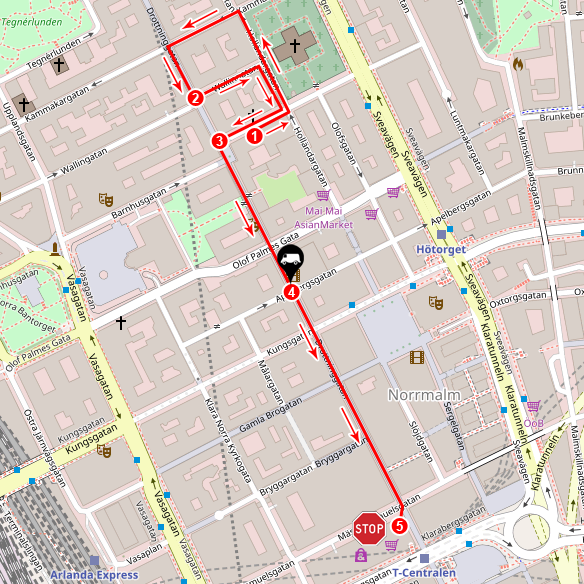
- The path of the attack
- Location: 59°19′58″N 018°03′44″E; Drottninggatan, Stockholm, Sweden
- Date: 7 April 2017; 9 years ago c. 14:53 CEST (UTC+2)
- Target: Civilian pedestrians
- Attack type: Vehicle-ramming attack, mass murder, terrorism
- Weapon: Hijacked Mercedes-Benz Actros
- Deaths: 5
- Injuries: 16 (including the perpetrator)
- Perpetrator: Islamic State
- Assailant: Rakhmat Akilov
- Motive: Islamic terrorism, protest against Swedish government military training in Iraq

On 7 April 2017, a vehicle-ramming terrorist attack took place in central Stockholm, the capital of Sweden. A hijacked truck was deliberately driven into crowds along Drottninggatan before being crashed into an Åhléns department store. Five people were killed and 14 others were seriously injured.

The perpetrator was Rakhmat Akilov, a 39-year-old rejected asylum seeker and a citizen of Uzbekistan, who was apprehended several hours later. He had sworn allegiance to the Islamic State in a self-recorded video the day before the attack, and Uzbek authorities alleged that he had joined the group. Akilov was convicted of murder and terrorist crimes, and sentenced to life in prison and, if released, deportation to Uzbekistan and lifetime expulsion from Sweden.

== Attack ==
Akilov chose to attack during an afternoon, as there were many tourists in the area. Akilov recorded a number of films in the Odenplan area where he is heard saying that it is time to kill "infidels" and that it grieved him how Muslims in the Levant and Afghanistan were dying. The attack took place at about 14:53 local time. It began when a truck for the Spendrups brewery was hijacked while making a delivery on the street Adolf Fredriks kyrkogata in central Stockholm. According to a Spendrups press release, the driver attempted to stop the hijacker by standing in front of the truck, but had to jump out of the way and was slightly injured when the hijacker accelerated toward him.

The hijacker then drove the truck at high speed into a pedestrian street, going about 500 meters down Drottninggatan, one of Stockholm's main shopping streets, hitting pedestrians along the way. Witnesses said the hijacker attempted to target children as he zigzagged on the street. The attack ended when the truck slammed into the Åhléns City department store on the corner of Drottninggatan and Mäster Samuelsgatan. The truck caught fire, but the flames were quickly doused by firefighters. The hijacker jumped out and fled the scene.

A homemade bomb was reportedly found in the truck after it was abandoned by the hijacker. Police sources said the device was found in a bag and had not been detonated, adding that the attacker had been burned by it. National Police Commissioner Dan Eliasson later said they had found a suspicious object in the driver's seat that "could be a bomb or an incendiary device", and was pending further investigation.

== Aftermath ==
=== Immediate response ===
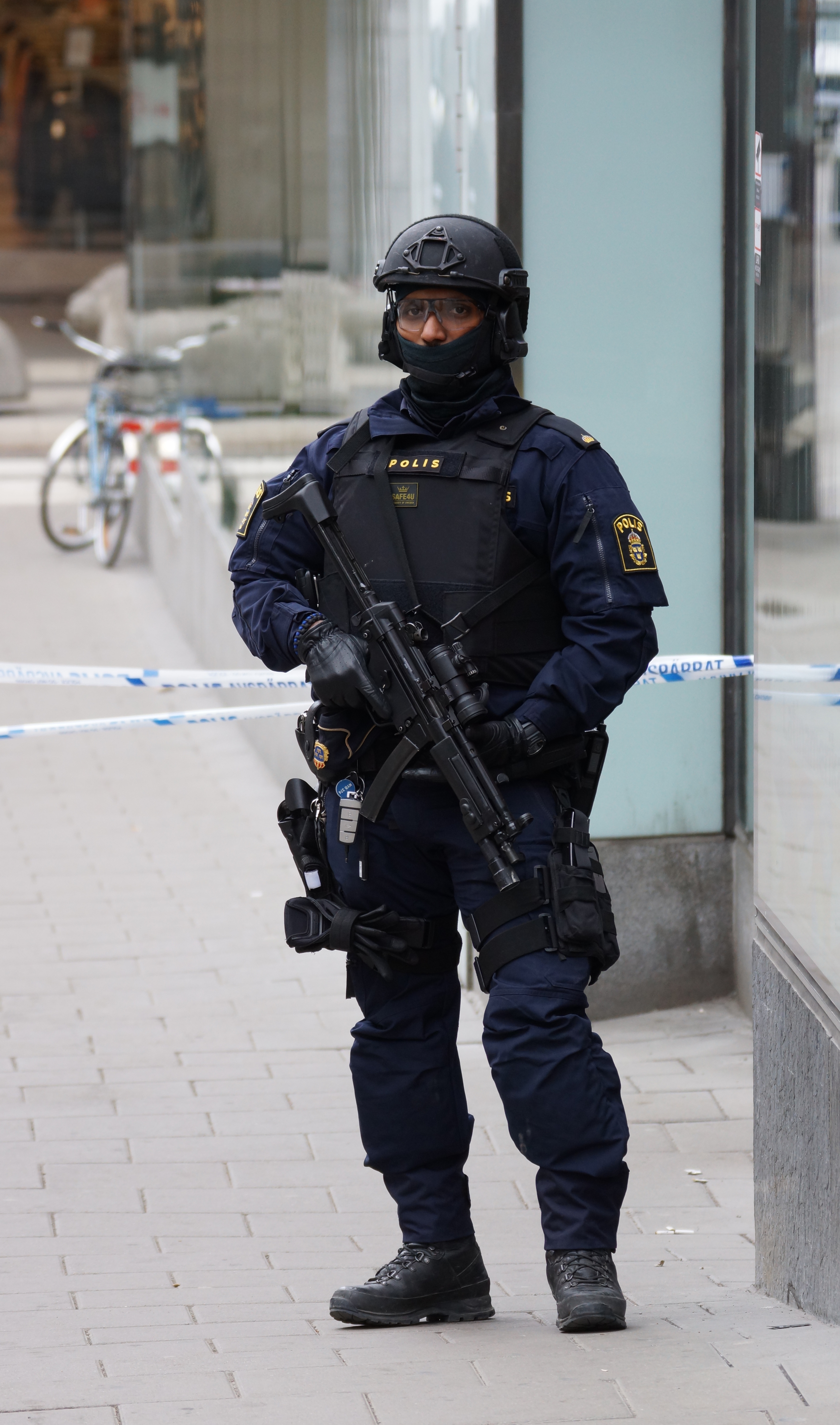
Swedish police officer in tactical gear on patrol the day after the attack in Stockholm

The Parliament House and the Metro system were locked down in response to the attack, and Stockholm Central Station was evacuated. All trains to and from Stockholm were put on hold, with traffic only resuming later in the evening.

Prime Minister of Sweden Stefan Löfven said in a press statement that the attack appeared to be terrorism, and that police and security services were treating it as such. Two days after the attack, the prime minister said the following:

I wish today to first address you who grieve someone you've lost or worry for someone who is injured. You should know that all of Sweden is with you. We know that our enemies are these awful murderers — not one-another.

King Carl XVI Gustaf, on behalf of the Royal Family, gave their condolences, stating, "Our hearts go out to the victims of this terrible tragedy, and to their families".

Swedish media reported on those who chose to help the injured, especially medical doctors working nearby who ran to help those in need. Police from all over Stockholm were called in to assist after the attack.

Swedish border controls were tightened following the attack, and travelers from other countries, including Nordic countries, were advised by police to bring their passports. However, the Swedish Security Service (Säpo) did not raise the risk assessment from "level 3" (on a scale of 1 to 5), the level it had been at since 2010.

On the day of the attack, Norwegian police said officers in the country's largest cities and at Oslo Airport would be armed. The day after the attack, a man was arrested and part of the Grønland district of Oslo closed off by police after a "bomb-like" device was found, which was later destroyed in a controlled explosion. The man, a 17-year-old Russian citizen, was charged on 9 April with illegal possession of an explosive device. The man arrived with his family in Norway as an asylum seeker in 2010, and was known to the Norwegian Police Security Service (PST) for having expressed support for the Islamic State of Iraq and the Levant (ISIS). With his background from the Caucasus, the 17-year-old has been linked to two other young Chechen men from the same martial arts club in the small northern town of Vadsø who traveled to fight for ISIS in Syria. The events led PST to raise the terror alert, indicating that attempted attacks during the coming year are "likely". Police patrols were also increased in Finland's capital Helsinki.

== Reactions ==
=== Domestic ===
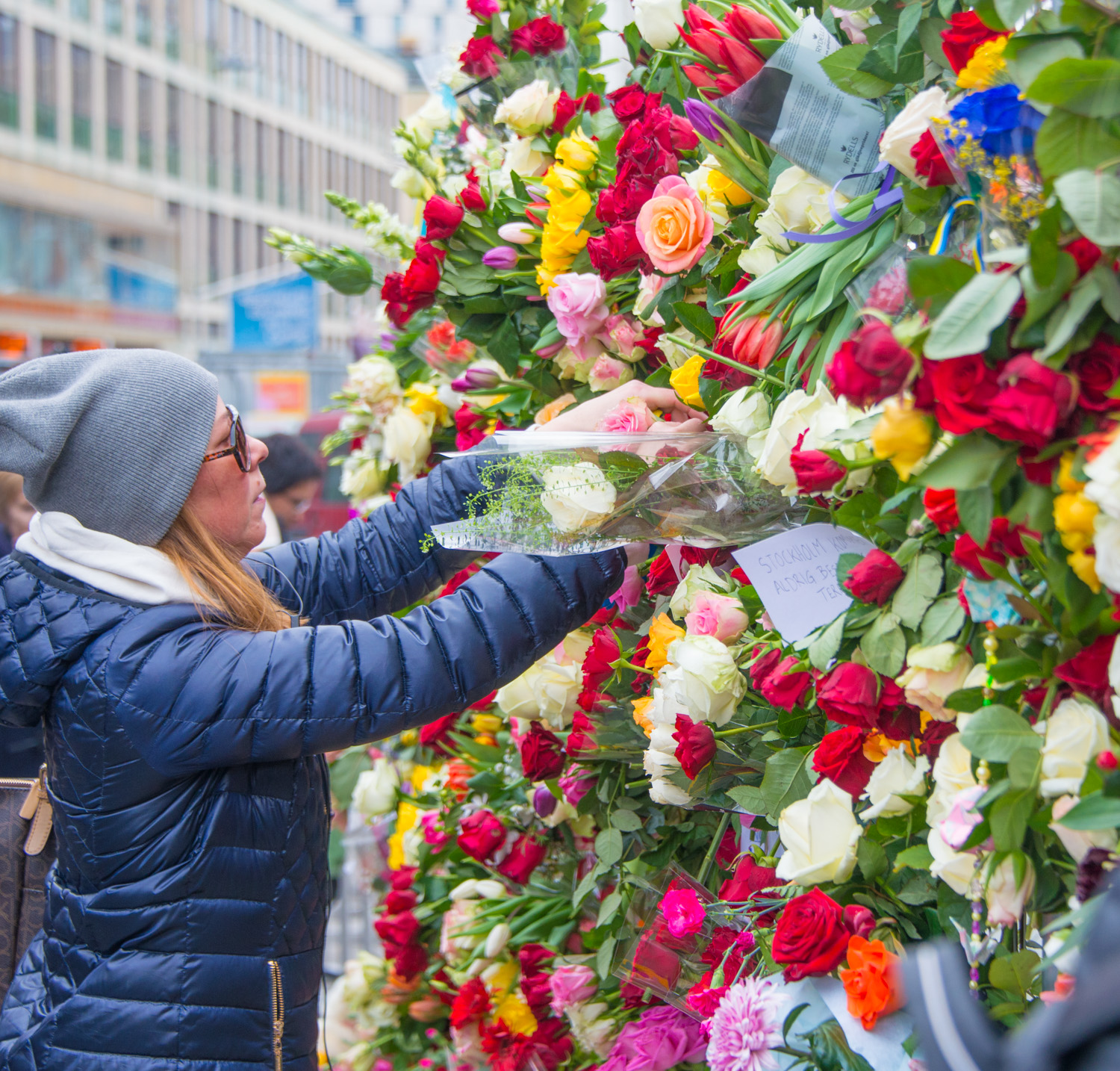
Flowers just outside the Åhléns department store in Stockholm the day after the attack

On 9 April, the Swedish Prime Minister said the government intended to change immigration law to facilitate the removal of people whose applications to stay in Sweden have been rejected.

On 9 April, more than forty thousand people gathered on Sergels torg (Sergel's Square) in Stockholm to honor the victims. Many people visited the site of the attack, leaving flowers and candles for the victims on Sergels Torg and on Drottninggatan, resulting in what was described as a "sea of flowers". Flowers were also left at Götaplatsen in Sweden's second-biggest city Gothenburg.

After the attack, there were proposals in Aftonbladet - one of Sweden's biggest newspapers - that vehicles be banned from Stockholm city center so they cannot be used as weapons, citing the use of vehicles as terrorist weapons in Stockholm as well as Nice, Berlin, Jerusalem, and London.

The department store Åhléns had planned to re-open two days after the attack, but received heavy criticism after saying they would be selling smoke-damaged clothing at reduced rates. Åhléns later chose to stay closed for one more day and not to sell any damaged clothing.

The Swedish far-right was accused of trying to profit from the attack, producing fake news and circulating fake quotations online. This included tweets and social media posts from officials of the Sweden Democrats, a right-wing nationalist party. A man with a name similar to that of the main suspect was falsely implicated on the website Avpixlat.

Following the attack, the social media website Facebook was criticized for not deleting images of badly wounded or dead victims. On 11 April, a Facebook spokesman said the website had begun deleting the images. Swedish authorities started cracking down on illegal immigrants in the country after the attack.

In April 2019, the municipality of Stockholm organised an event to place a wreath to commemorate the anniversary of the attack. Families of the victims were not invited and were banned from attending the event which the municipality said was "private".

=== International ===
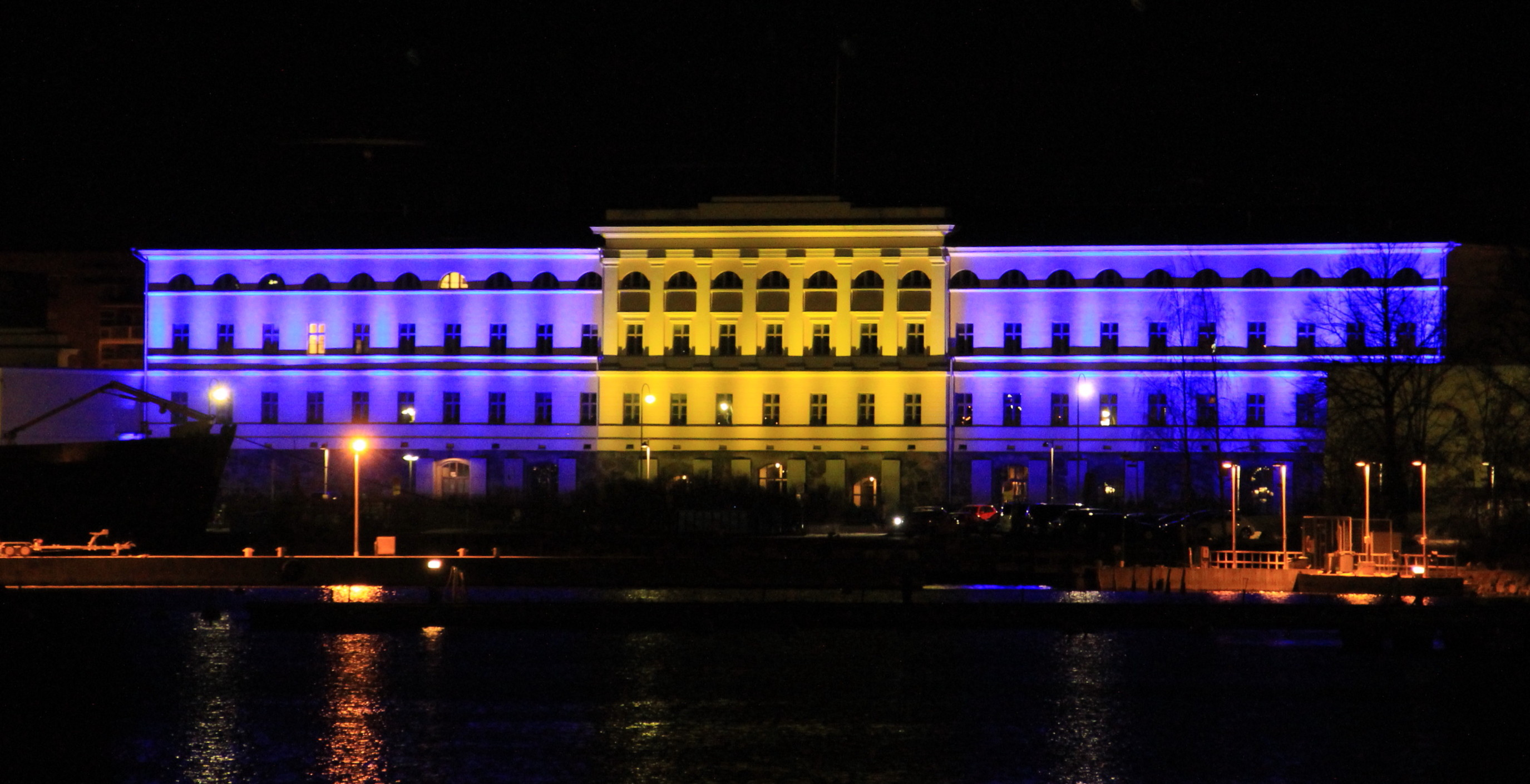
Finland's Ministry for Foreign Affairs, lit up in the colours of the Swedish flag, in order to commemorate the victims

The lights on the Eiffel Tower were switched off on the evening of the attack to mourn the deaths. Nice, a city which bore witness to a similar but deadlier attack in 2016, raised the Swedish flag at half-mast the day after the attack to show solidarity with the Swedish people. In Brussels, where a terrorist attack took place a year earlier, the ING Marnix building near the Throne metro station was also decorated with a moving Swedish flag animation.

Responses by the heads of state or foreign ministers of several European countries were issued within hours of the attack. However, discussion among US news media and officials was dominated by the American missile strike in Syria, which happened the same day.

Stéphane Dujarric, the Spokesperson for the Secretary-General of the United Nations, said, "Our sympathy goes to the families of the victims and all those affected and we wish the injured a prompt recovery. The United Nations stands in solidarity with the people and Government of Sweden". Pope Francis also said prayers for the victims of the attack.

Danish government minister Inger Støjberg expressed concerns that at least 12,000 illegal immigrants were still living in Sweden after having their asylum applications rejected. She said that if satisfactory answers could not be given by the Swedish government, Denmark would consider implementing border checks on the Danish side of the border. The only border checks done in April 2017 were on the Swedish side. The attack is described as "driven by jihadist ideology" by Europol.

== Perpetrator ==
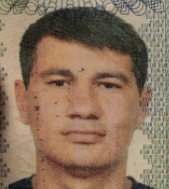
Photo of the perpetrator from his Polish visa

Swedish police initially published pictures of a man wearing a hooded jacket, whom they wanted to question over the attack. At 19:55 (17:55 UTC) on 7 April (roughly 5 hours after the attack), Rakhmat Akilov (born 14 February 1978), a 39-year-old construction worker from Uzbekistan, was apprehended in Märsta, north of Stockholm, suspected, on probable cause, (Note: The highest level of suspicion for terror crime under current Swedish law.) of "terrorist crimes through murder". The police said he had been found "behaving suspiciously with minor injuries" and was believed to have driven the truck. He was officially arrested at 01:15 on 8 April, and formally identified by the Swedish Prosecution Authority on 11 April.

The Swedish Security Service (Säpo) was heavily involved in the investigation. In 2016, Säpo had received some information on the suspect, but were unable to confirm it when they followed up on it. They reportedly deemed him a "marginal figure" on the fringes of extremist groups.

Akilov came from a family from a village outside Samarkand, currently in Uzbekistan. His older brother Olim Akilov stated in an interview with Swedish newspaper Aftonbladet that they considered themselves a "typical Soviet family", and he mentions that they did not welcome the collapse of the USSR. According to the brother, neither Rakhmat Akilov nor his children were ever religious, and Rakhmat did not attend mosque in Russia or Uzbekistan or show signs of increased religiosity. Akilov moved to Russia in 2009 to work at the same cement factory outside Moscow as his older brother, which he did until 2013 when he lost this job.

As stated by Akilov during police interrogation, in Tashkent he applied for a visa to Poland, after which traveled to Warsaw and then Gdańsk, from where he took a ferry to Sweden.

Akilov arrived in Sweden on 10 October 2014. He claimed asylum at the Swedish Migration Agency. The agency registered his application under the given fake name although his true identity was known and despite that according to the Dublin Regulation his application should have been handled in Poland, as he already had a visa there. Akilov stated he needed refuge from "the Uzbek security services which he claims tortured him and accused him of terrorism and treason". However, Sweden's Migration Board ruled that there was no evidence of this, and in late 2016, Akilov was ordered to leave Sweden within four weeks. When he failed to do so voluntarily and did not appear at the Swedish Migration Agency when called, the case was referred to the police; however, he went into hiding and could not be found for deportation. Reportedly, he lived at various addresses in Stockholm suburbs and was known as a hard worker, and a "normal Muslim" who visited the mosque on Fridays but got drunk on weekends and used cannabis. Shortly before the attack, Akilov was fired from his construction job, due to using drugs and sleeping while at work on dangerous construction sites with asbestos.

On 9 April, Swedish police said Akilov had "expressed sympathy for extremist organizations, among them IS [Islamic State]". On 14 April, Uzbek Foreign Minister Abdulaziz Kamilov said that Akilov had joined ISIL after moving to Sweden, and had encouraged friends and family in Uzbekistan to fight for ISIL. Uzbekistan had opened an investigation and charged Akilov with participation in extremist, separatist and fundamentalist groups, as well as with making and distributing material that threatened public security. An Uzbek security source said Akilov had tried to travel to Syria in 2015 to join ISIL but was stopped at the Turkey-Syria border and sent back to Sweden. The source added that, two months before the attack, Uzbek authorities had put Akilov on a wanted list for those suspected of religious extremism. The Foreign Minister said that intelligence on Akilov had been "passed to one of our Western partners, so that the Swedish side could be informed". The Swedish Ministry for Foreign Affairs said it had not received such information. ISIS has not claimed responsibility for the attack, but experts note that the group tends not to do so if its members are arrested, as in the Stockholm attack.

Akilov was registered at the same address as another person with links to financial crime. Initial suspicions of those involved sending money to ISIS could not be confirmed, though a number of people were convicted of false accounting and severe tax crimes. Early reports suggested Akilov had exchanged WhatsApp messages with a Chechen ISIL supporter just before and immediately after the attack. The authenticity of the chat was questioned, however. His former Facebook page reportedly linked to extremists and featured at least two ISIS propaganda videos. It has also been suggested that he had liked a Facebook page called "Friends of Libya and Syria", whose aim is to expose the "terrorism of the imperialistic financial capitals" of the United States, Britain, and Arab "dictatorships". During his time in prison, Akilov had made "Hitler salutes" and racially insulted personnel, leading to an investigation for racial agitation which was later dropped as the threats and insults were directed to specific individuals and not made public. Akilov has shown aggressive tendencies in prison, which requires him to be protected by four employees, including one armed.

Akilov has supported the Islamist organisation Hizb-ut-Tahrir on Facebook. According to the prosecutor, Akilov's motive for carrying out the attack was to make the Swedish government cease its military training effort in Iraq.

=== Legal proceedings ===
The public prosecutor successfully requested Akilov be remanded in custody during the preliminary investigation on 10 April 2017, pending a decision on prosecution. Akilov requested a Sunni Muslim defense attorney, which was rejected by the Stockholm District Court. A pre-trial hearing was held at Stockholm District Court on 11 April, where his lawyer said he confessed to a terrorist crime and intended to plead guilty. A court-ordered psychological evaluation determined that Akilov did not suffer from any mental disorder at the time of the attack. Prosecutor Hans Ihrman indicted Akilov for terrorist crimes on 30 January 2018.

Akilov was found guilty of terrorist crimes by five murders, attempted terrorist crimes by 119 counts of attempted murder and 24 counts of endangering others on 7 June 2018. He was sentenced to life in prison, and will be legally allowed to request a time-set prison sentence in 2028. If released, he would be deported to Uzbekistan and banned from returning to Sweden. Akilov was imprisoned in Kumla Prison, a high security facility. In August 2018, he was assaulted by a fellow inmate who wanted vengeance for Akilov's terrorist attack.

=== Further investigation ===
Several other people were briefly detained by police in connection with the attack. Police said on 13 April that they had held about 700 interrogations and made approximately 300 seizures during the preliminary investigation. Five people were detained the day after the attack in two separate raids of a car and apartment linked to Akilov, all of whom were released from police custody within two days. The next day, a second suspect with links to Akilov was arrested on a lower level of suspicion of terrorist crimes through murder. The prosecutor revoked the arrest of the suspect two days later as the suspicions had weakened. Another person was arrested for an undisclosed offense on 23 April and two days later the arrest was revoked as the person was cleared of any involvement in the attack.

== Casualties ==
Five people died as a result of the attack. Four of the victims who were killed at the scene or died in hospital shortly thereafter were identified as British Spotify executive Chris Bevington, 41, a 31-year-old Belgian psychologist, a 69-year-old Swedish woman, and Ebba Åkerlund, an 11-year-old Swedish girl. The last casualty, a 69-year-old Swedish politician from the Green Party, Marie Kide, died in hospital three weeks after the attack. In a press release on the day of the attack, the Stockholm County Council said that 15 people were being treated in hospitals, nine for serious injuries.

Ebba Åkerlund was mentioned as a motivating factor in the manifesto of the perpetrator of the Christchurch mosque shootings. Åkerlund's parents denounced the shootings and the use of her death as a pretext to commit terrorist attacks.

== See also ==
- 2010 Stockholm bombings
- 2017 Turku stabbing
- List of terrorist incidents in April 2017
- List of vehicle-ramming attacks
- Murder (Swedish law)
- Terrorism in Sweden
