= Malmö Mosque =

Mosque in Malmö, Skåne, Sweden

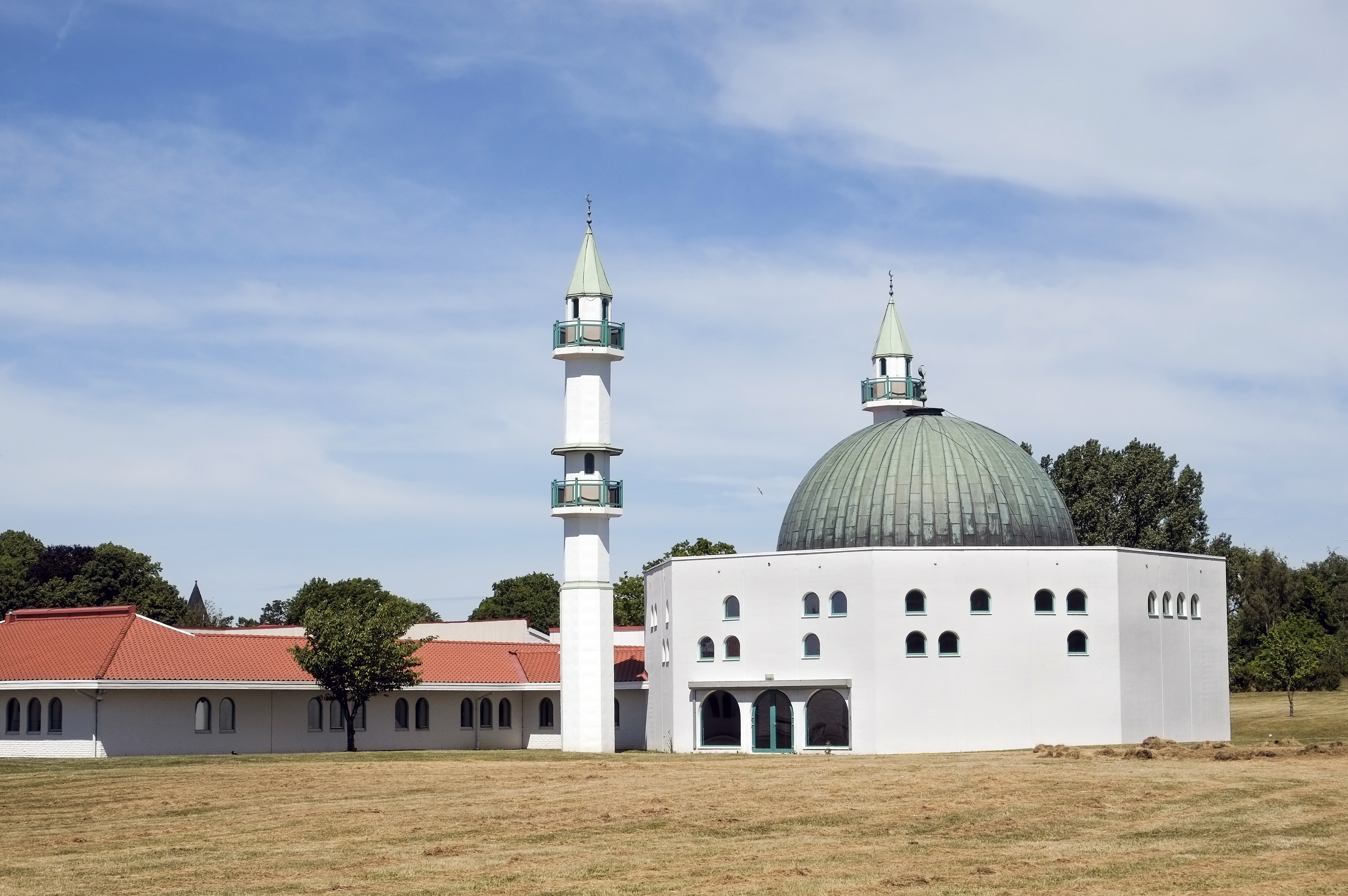

Religion
- Affiliation: Sunni Islam

Location
- Location: Malmö, Sweden
- Interactive map of Malmö Mosque
- Coordinates: 55°34′29″N 13°03′07″E

Architecture
- Type: Mosque
- Style: Islamic
- Groundbreaking: 1983; 43 years ago
- Completed: 1984; 42 years ago

Specifications
- Capacity: 1,000
- Minaret: 2

Website
- Official website

The Malmö Mosque (Swedish: Malmö moské) is the second oldest mosque in Sweden. It is located in Jägersro villastad, a neighbourhood in Husie, Malmö. It was inaugurated on 20 April 1984 and is administered by the organization Islamic Center. Adjacent to the mosque is a charter school, which is also run by the Islamic Center.

There have been several attacks against the mosque, including an arson attack on 28 April 2003, which damaged the mosque and destroyed other buildings at the Islamic Center.

== History ==
During the 1960s and 1970s many Muslims from former Yugoslavia, Turkey and other Muslim countries came to Sweden to work temporary, but with time they started to realize that life in Sweden became more long-lasting. This became not least apparent when the first death among Muslim immigrants occurred. So in the 1960s the idea of building a mosque arose and by the late 1970s the zoning for the construction started.Malmö Municipality was helpful by sparing a big plot of land of 32,000 square metres. After some standard procedures such as archaeological excavations, the construction started in April 1983. The mosque was inaugurated on 20 April 1984 and the first Friday prayers were held that day. The initiator of the project was Bejzat Becirov, who led the Islamic Center and its mosque until he died in November 2018 at the age of 80.

In 2008, after having financial difficulties an organisation with close ties to Muammar Gaddafi, called World Islamic Call Society (WICS), bought the mosque for 30 million Swedish kronor. During the Libyan Civil War they were criticized by Swedish media about the connection between the mosque and the organization. Bejzat Becirov — the then president of the mosque — stated that WICS is autonomous from the government in Tripoli and that it's a serious organization who's a member of UNESCO.

== Attacks ==
There have been several attacks against the mosque. One of them, an arson attack in 2003, damaged the mosque and destroyed other buildings at the Islamic Center. The restoration cost was 17 million Swedish kronor. There were two smaller arson attacks in 2005 and the last of them cost 1 million Swedish kronor. No one was arrested for the attacks in 2003 and 2005. Between then (October 2005) and the reopening in 2004, there were at least 20 other cases of sabotage.

The serial shooter Peter Mangs, who was responsible for a series of shootings in Malmö, was convicted for attempted murder on an imam in the mosque on 31 December 2009. He fired several shots against a window but missed his target, though the imam got hit by broken glass.

== Capacity and community size ==
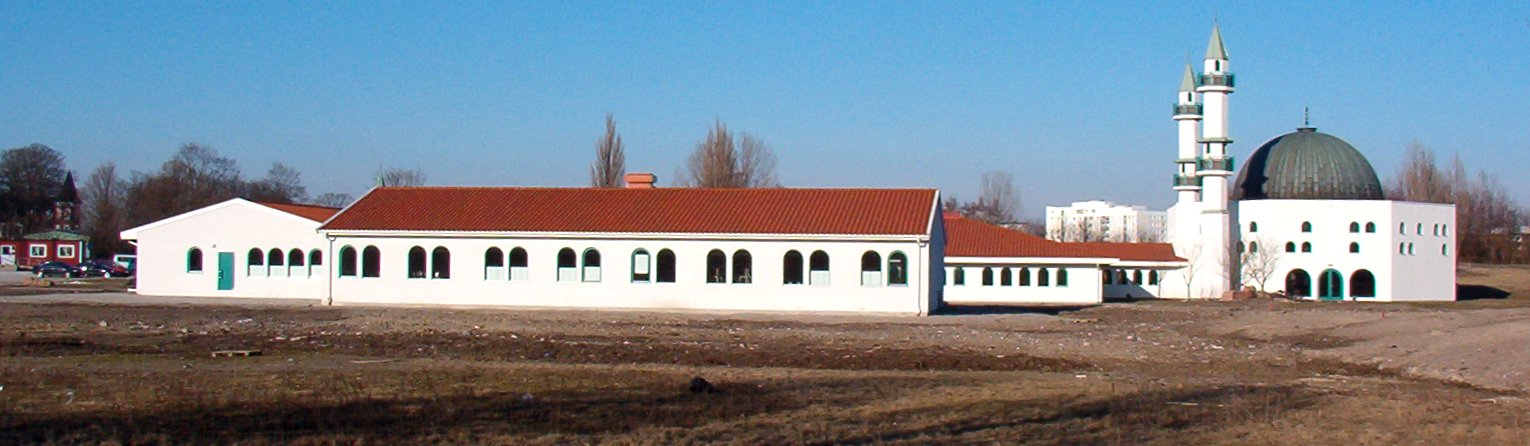
The mosque and the school

The mosque is attended by Muslims from Scania and Copenhagen, Denmark. The mosque was expanded in response to the growing Muslim population of the 1980s. Today, the mosque is too small to satisfy the needs of the Muslim community in the city and region, which according to the Islamic Center stand at 45,000 and 100,000, respectively. Around 1,000 individuals attend the Friday prayers, and the mosque accommodates over 70,000 visitors per year.

There are over 130 languages spoken among the members of the organization.

== School ==
The charter school is called Ögårdsskolan and was opened in 2000. It follows the Swedish curriculum but has an Islamic orientation. It is open for everyone. As of 2019, the school has approximately 250 students from preschool class to primary school until age class six of nine.

== See also ==
- Islam in Sweden
- Religion in Sweden
- 2014 Sweden mosques arson attack series
