= Malmö Synagogue =

Orthodox synagogue in Malmö, Scania, Skåne County, Sweden

- Swedish: Malmö synagoga
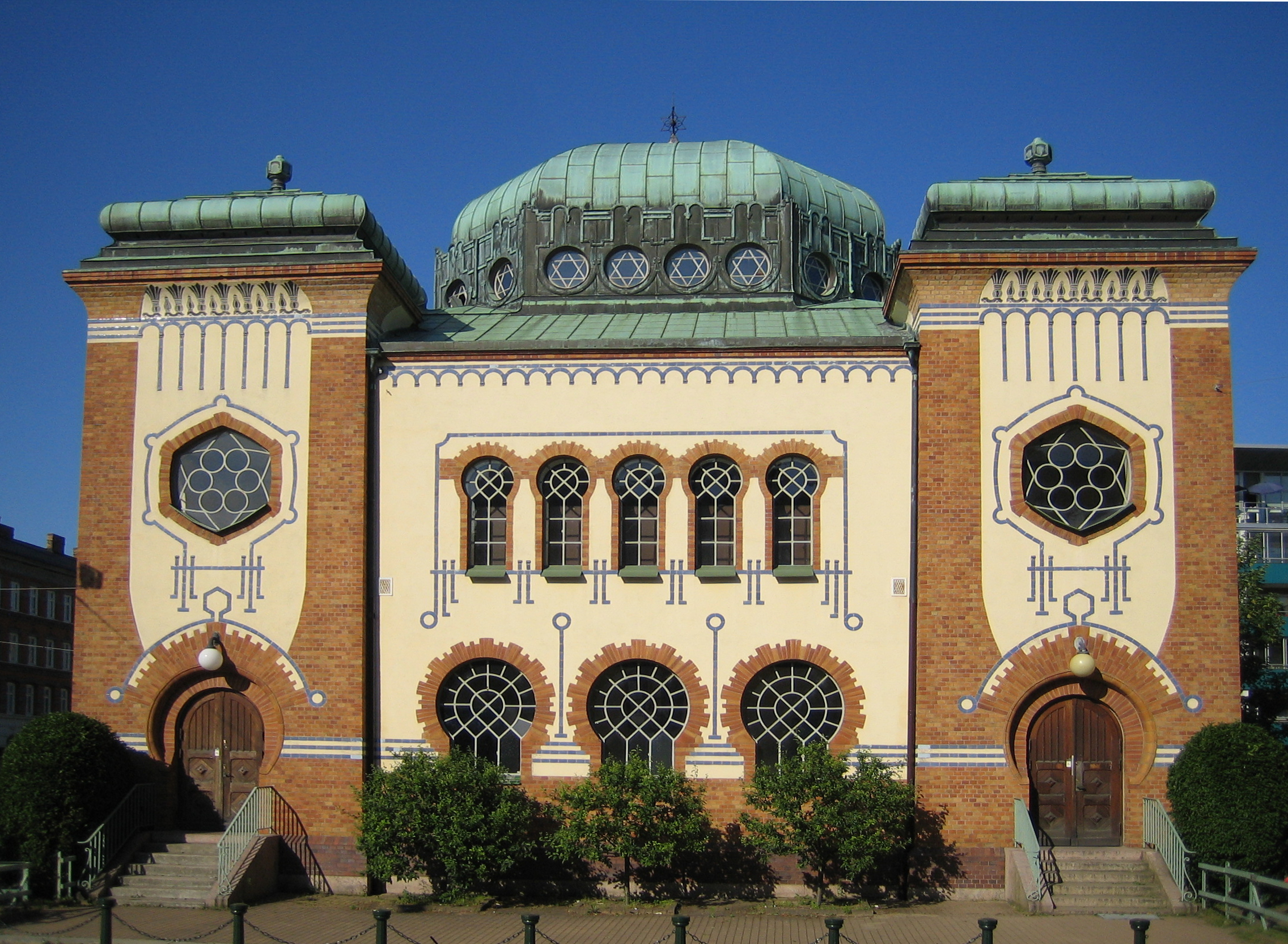
- The façade of the synagogue, in 2007

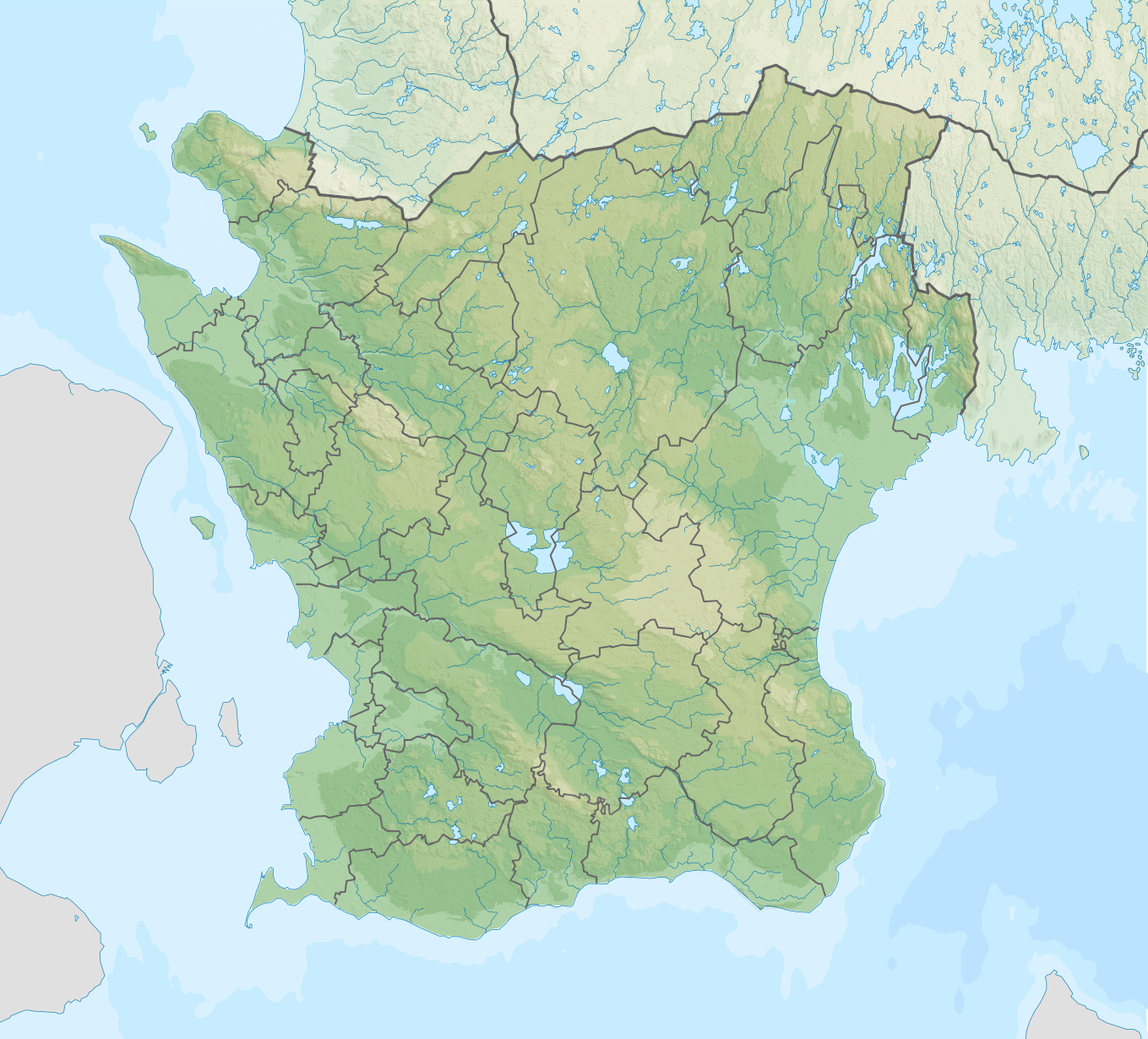
- Location of the synagogue in Skåne County

Religion
- Affiliation: Orthodox Judaism
- Rite: Nusach Ashkenaz
- Ecclesiastical or organisational status: Synagogue
- Status: Active

Location
- Location: Föreningsgatan, Malmö, Skåne County
- Country: Sweden
- Coordinates: 55°35′58″N 13°00′39″E

Architecture
- Architect: John Smedberg
- Type: Synagogue architecture
- Style: Art Nouveau; Moorish Revival
- Established: 1871 (as a congregation)
- Completed: 1903
- Materials: Brick

Website
- jfm.se (in Swedish)

The Malmö Synagogue (Swedish: Malmö synagoga, Hebrew: בית הכנסת של מאלמו) is an Orthodox Jewish congregation and synagogue, located on Föreningsgatan, Malmö, in Skåne County, Sweden. The synagogue was designed by John Smedberg in the Art Nouveau and Moorish Revival styles and completed in 1903.

The synagogue is one of the few surviving synagogues in Europe built in a Moorish Revival style, as most of them were destroyed during Kristallnacht 1938.

At the inauguration of Malmö Synagogue, it was Malmö's first non-Christian place of worship. Malmö has two Jewish cemeteries: one section in the northern part of Sankt Pauli kyrkogård and another, newer section in Östra kyrkogården.

In 2021, the synagogue attracted approximately 5,000 visitors per annum.

== History ==
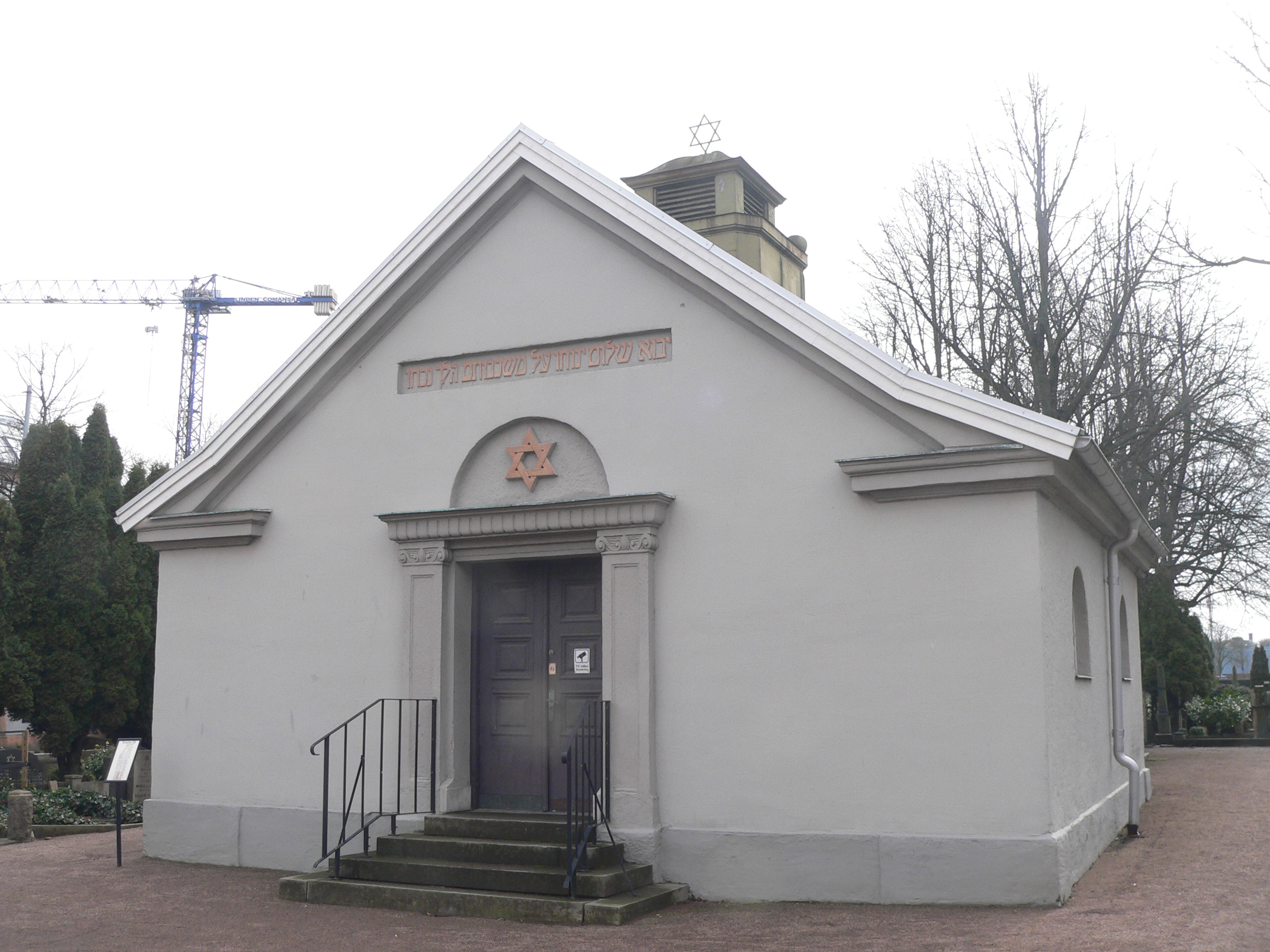
The Jewish chapel at the Jewish cemetery section of Sankt Pauli kyrkogård in Malmö

The congregation started in 1871 as the fifth Jewish community established in Sweden after Stockholm, Gothenburg, Norrköping and Karlskrona. The community consisted mostly of immigrants from Germany and Poland and had an initial membership base of 251 people.

Later on, more Jews fled from Poland, Russia, Ukraine and the Baltic states due to poverty, antisemitism and the threat of being drafted into the Imperial Russian Army for 25 years. The first rabbi Joseph Wohlstein was hired in 1900 and the synagogue was built in 1903 with funding from Jacob and Clara Lachmann.

During the Second World War Danish Jews fled to Malmö, which expanded the community. During the 1970s, the membership peaked with over 2,000 members which was close to 1% of Malmö's population, mostly Jews from Poland, due to a state-led antisemitic persecution.

Since 1990, many members began to feel growing antisemitic attitudes and sentiments in Malmö and the community have led to a decline in adult membership by approximately 500 between 1999 and 2019.

An Egalitarian community was established in 2011, in parallel to the Orthodox community.

=== Events ===
A Holocaust conference was held in Malmö in October 2021. It was an International Forum for the remembrance of the Holocaust and against antisemitism in Malmö. 44 countries participated, including Sweden's prime minister Stefan Löfven and the King of Sweden Carl XVI Gustaf.

In collaboration with Malmö Municipality, the synagogue opened up as a knowledge center in January 2022.

== Attacks ==
On 23 July 2010, the synagogue was attacked with explosives. The explosion was caused with some kind of fireworks or firecracker containing too little gunpowder to seriously damage the building.

On 28 September 2012, the synagogue was attacked with an explosive device, shattering a window.

On 4 November 2023, pro-Palestinian demonstrators burned an Israeli flag and chanted "bomb Israel" outside the synagogue. The European Jewish Congress condemned the incident: "Intimidating the Jewish community and blaming them for the events in the Middle East is blatant antisemitism."

== See also ==
- History of the Jews in Sweden
- List of synagogues in Sweden
