= 2026 Syrian fuel protests =

Protests against fuel prices in Syria

- Part of the 2026 Iran war fuel crisis
- Date: 13 September 2026 – present
- Location: Aleppo Governorate, Idlib Governorate, Deir ez-Zor Governorate, Raqqa Governorate, Daraa Governorate, Hasakah Governorate, Syria
- Caused by: Rising fuel prices due to Iran war and Yemeni civil war; Cost-of-living crisis
- Goals: Repeal fuel price increases
- Methods: Protests; Demonstrations; Traffic obstruction; Labor strikes; Tire fires
- Status: Ongoing: Hearing at the People's Assembly on 20 September; Resumption of local refineries on 17 September

On 13 September 2026, nationwide protests driven by rising fuel prices erupted in Syria. It is the largest protest in Syria since the fall of the Assad regime in December 2024. Demonstrators have been seen blocking roads and convoys of oil tankers and burning tires, demanding for the price increases to be reversed.

== Background ==
Leading up to the protests, oil prices in Syria had spiked due to recent events in the Iran war and Yemeni civil war. A major renovation was underway at the Baniyas Refinery, which limited petroleum production, causing Syria to more closely rely on petroleum imports.

Syrians rely heavily on diesel for running generators and transportation amid widespread power cuts due to the fuel shortage.

On 13 September, the Syrian government announced that diesel prices would rise by 40 percent, petrol by 26 to 28 percent and household and industrial gas around nine percent. The price of standard diesel rose from 125 to 175 pounds per liter. This exacerbated the already severe cost-of-living crisis in Syria, with the UN estimating that 90 percent of Syrians live under the poverty line. Shortly after the price increase took place, protests started across the country.

== Protests ==
Protesters blocked the M5 motorway between Aleppo and Damascus, burning tires along it and calling for the government to reverse the decision. The road was blocked for several hours before resuming on 14 September. On 16 September, protesters shut down the M4 motorway near Tal Tamr, obstructing hundreds of oil tankers, saying they would not reopen the route unless the prices were reversed. In northeastern Syria, protesters blocked highways in parts of Hasakah, Deir ez-Zor, and Raqqa. According to the Syrian Observatory for Human Rights, minibus drivers went on strike in Rif Dimashq, causing traffic congestion. Protests occurred in Maarat al-Numan in response to the price increases, located in the Idlib Governorate, which was the principal territorial base of takfiri groups from which Syria’s current leadership emerged.

== Reactions ==
After calls for Energy Minister Mohammed al-Bashir to resign, the People's Assembly summoned him to appear before a hearing on 17 September, but was postponed 20 September after the hearing was expanded to include oil, electricity, water, and mining.

On 17 September, al-Bashir addressed the protests and announced a three grade system of pricing, with subsidized diesel for heating, agriculture, and industry at 115 pounds per liter, fuel from "friendly countries" for productive and service sectors and heavy machinery at 150 pounds per liter, while standard diesel would remain at 175 pounds per liter. Al-Bashir and Syrian Petroleum Company Chief Youssef Qablawi also said local refineries would resume operations under the supervision of the SPC, bringing crude oil processing capacity to about 35,000 barrels per day.

On 20 September, al-Bashir appeared before the People's Assembly and gave an address discussing a large initiative to combat the fuel shortage. At the People's Assembly, al-Bashir announced a major $250 million project to complete the Arab Gas Pipeline, the drilling of new gas wells, and considered using electric refineries, but did not decrease the gas prices.

== See also ==
- 2026 Irish fuel protests
- 2026 French student protests
- Fuel protests in 2026
