= 2026 French protests =

2026 French protests may refer to:

- 2026 French fuel protests, started on 15 September 2026
- 2026 French civil unrest, started on 18 September 2026
