= 2026 French civil unrest =

- Part of the Gen Z protests, the 2026 European unrest and civil unrest in France
- Left to right and top to bottom: protestors atop the Monument à la République; looting of a Chanel boutique in Paris; police in Perpignan; a protester carrying a République-Voltaire bus station sign; Paris students protest at their high school; graffiti calling for Emmanuel Macron to resign with ACAB and hammer and sickle underneath.
- Date: 15 September 2026 – present (66 days)
- Location: France
- Caused by: Cost-of-living, debt, housing and fuel crisis; inflation, economic stagnation, social inequality and unemployment; austerity and budget cuts; teacher and staff shortages, overcrowded classes, dilapidated buildings and infrastructure, overloaded timetables and deficient undergraduate admissions web system "Parcoursup"
- Methods: Arson, demonstrations, occupations, vandalism, riots, looting, internet activism, student activism, strike actions, blockades, civil disobedience, barricades, casserole protests, hacktivism, direct actions and sit-ins
- Status: Ongoing

Parties
Gilets jaunes; Student unions; MJCF; UEC; USL; EMF; MNL; Les Lycéens!; Student Union; Teacher unions; FSU; SNALC; Police unions; Alliance; Labour organizations; CFDT; SUD; CGT; UNSA; CFTC; CNT; FO; CFE-CGC; Confédération Paysanne; Political parties; LFI; PCF; PCR; Unaffiliated protesters (Note: Including farmers, fishers, miners, truckers, construction and energy workers, medical and university staff, public employees, policemen, teachers, student protestors, pro-Palestine groups, political and climate activists and others.)	Government of France; Ministry of the Interior; National Police; Paris Police Prefecture; CRS; National Gendarmerie; Mobile Gendarmerie; Ministry of Armed Forces; French Armed Forces; French Army; Paris Fire Brigade; National Guard; Ministry of Justice; Municipal governments; Municipal Police

Lead figures
Ryad Rani (USL); Jean-Luc Mélenchon; Louis Boyard; Bally Bagayoko; Manuel Bompard; Mathilde Panot; Marie Mesmeur; Fabien Roussel; Sophie Binet	Emmanuel Macron; Sébastien Lecornu; Gérald Darmanin; Édouard Geffray; Laurent Nuñez; Catherine Vautrin; Fabien Mandon; Louis Laugier

Casualties and losses
Demonstrators: 248 students and 149 educators injured, six seriously. One demonstrator died after going into cardiac arrest in Paris.	Police officers: 1,000 injured on 17 October, seven seriously.
- As of 22 October 2026: 2,700 people have been arrested across France, more than 1,000 have appeared in court, and 217 have been jailed after being convicted in fast-track trials, according to the French Minister of Justice, Gérald Darmanin.

Since September 2026, demonstrations and protests against poor economic and school conditions by workers and lycée (high school) students have taken place in France. In early October, the protests developed into a nationwide mobilization involving students, teachers, parents, political organizations, the yellow vests and trade unions, with an estimated 575,000–1.57 million people participating nationwide.

Labour movements emerged in mid-September in reaction to the cost-of-living and fuel crisis caused by the blockade of the Strait of Hormuz and Bab al-Mandab Strait, spearheaded by a newly revived yellow vests movement. Causes also included high inflation, housing, economic stagnation, social inequality and unemployment, coupled with austerity measures and social spending cuts resulting from the public debt crisis.

Soon after, teacher shortages, overcrowded classrooms, run-down buildings, and limited public investment in social programs and infrastructure sparked immense students protests nationwide. Students noted stress linked to the university application website Parcoursup and high temperatures in classrooms that reached up to 40 °C (104 °F) during the 2026 European heatwaves. Despite forming separately, the protest movements converged on 17 October, along with other unrelated movements.

The demonstrations received support from trade unions, students unions such as the Student Union, Étudiants musulmans de France (EMF), left-wing political parties and political activists. These demonstrations are considered to be part of a wider European unrest which includes protests in Belgium, Albania, Greece, Italy, Portugal, Spain, Austria, Ireland, Serbia and Germany.

The protests have been marked by violent conflict between police and protesters. Initial police responses used a variety of forceful crowd-control weapons, resulting in serious injuries, including to children. French Justice Minister Gerald Darmanin announced that about 15,000 people have been arrested; 7,184 were arrested since 17 October in connection with protests against rising living costs. Of those arrested, 4,523 were adults and 2,661 were minors. Another 8,000 were arrested in student protests. The French government has accused the far-left of stirring up the unrest for political gain. Protester leaders have argued the movement is a spontaneous showing of economic grievance.

The police response drew criticism from human rights organizations like Amnesty International, Human Rights Watch, and the UN Human Rights Office. The government rejected accusations of police repression, with Interior Minister Laurent Nuñez maintaining that the response had been proportionate in almost all cases and that some protests had turned into riots.

== Background ==
=== Economic conditions ===
In 2026, France's economy faced an unprecedented series of shocks. No economic growth occurred since the new year, shrinking by 0.2% in the first quarter, stagnating in the second quarter, and unexpectedly suffering a 0.1% decline in the third quarter of 2026.

At the end of June, the Institut national de la statistique et des études économiques (Insee) reported government debt as €3.596 trillion ($4.08 trillion), approximately 119% of GDP, almost double the EU limit of under 60% of GDP; it is the highest in French history and third highest in the eurozone. Despite the debt crisis, deficit remained above 5% of GDP, far exceeding the EU threshold of 3%. Public spending also stood at 57% of GDP. However, it was uncovered in October that 32% of the Ministry of National Education’s budget of €28.5 billion ($32 billion) was used toward paying pensions for retirees and not education. Demographic imbalance shifted the worker-to-retiree ratio to 0.94 workers per pensioner.

Inflation accelerated while wages struggled to keep up, reaching 3.1% year-on-year in September and 3.4% by early October 2026, the highest since January 2024. Due to the blockade of the Strait of Hormuz and Bab al-Mandab Strait in the 2026 Iran war and Yemeni civil war, the price of diesel in France rose to €2.37 per liter ($2.72 per liter) in September, just 1c below its record high of €2.38. Accommodating for the high fuel prices contributed to rising inflation and cost-of-living in the country.

Unemployment, poverty, high rent prices and government spending cuts also have motivated protestors both in France and across Europe.

=== Study conditions and government budget ===
The protests came at the start of the school year and at the same time as a public-sector strike over the government's budget plans, which include €61 billion in new spending cuts. Students cited unfilled teaching posts, overcrowded classes, long timetables and deteriorating facilities among their grievances. A 17-year-old pupil at the Lycée Paul-Éluard in Saint-Denis described temporary toilets without water, rats and cockroaches in school, and temperatures ranging from −5 °C in winter to 40 °C in summer in temporary classrooms. Another pupil described rooms with too few tables, noting that teachers had explained their own discontent before the pupils decided to join them. Ryad Rani, president of the secondary-students' union Union Syndicale Lycéenne (USL), cited a pupil who had gone seven months without a French teacher in a year with a French exam, and classes of 32 to 36 students; pupils elsewhere told ICI of classes of 35.

The Créteil rectorat told Agence France-Presse that demands still varied by school—teachers not replaced, class size, heavy timetables, shortages of education assistants, nurses, social workers and managers, incidents between pupils and teachers left without follow-up, and deficient undergraduate admissions web portal Parcoursup. France Info summarized what it was hearing from pupils as more resources, smaller classes, buildings in better condition, enough teachers and staff, and less stress from Parcoursup.

=== Previous protests ===
Riots and civil unrest have a long history in France.

In May 1968, students in Nanterre and Sorbonne at the University of Paris rose against overcrowding and restrictive rules. Police attacked the student protesters with batons and tear gas and invaded campuses. The protests extended to opponents of the Vietnam War and president Charles de Gaulle. Trade unions joined the protests and organized mass demonstrations and a general strike, with 10 million participating at its peak. On the brink of collapse, Charles de Gaulle dissolved the National Assembly and called for a snap election. De Gaulle's Union of Democrats for the Republic won a major victory in the election, which ended the crisis. Though it died out, May 68 significantly influenced the rise of future movements in France.

In autumn 1990, lycée students, many from working-class Paris suburbs, protested over safety, cleanliness, staffing and materials. The protests reached on the order of 100,000 people in Paris and about 150,000 nationwide. Education minister Lionel Jospin answered with an emergency plan and an increase in the education budget.

In early 2005, lycée students and their teachers mobilized against reforms to the education system made by François Fillon, and in particular against a reform of the baccalauréat that they believed would lead to greater inequalities in the value of diplomas from different schools. Between 15,000 and 40,000 students took part in the protests. Fillon backed down and announced a government amendment removing changes to the baccalauréat from the bill.

In spring 2018, opposition to the ORE law and to the new Parcoursup platform was formed mainly among university occupations. A scattering of lycée blockades took place. In the autumn, lycée students mobilized again, against Parcoursup and against Jean-Michel Blanquer's baccalauréat reform. On 17 November, fuel taxes prompted the formation of the yellow vests movement. On 11 December, hundreds of establishments were blocked or badly disrupted. Le Monde diplomatique later wrote that this map could not be explained only by the knock-on effect of the yellow vests protests, then at their height, but that the yellow vest movement was part of the context. Parcoursup was kept, with some adjustments, and the baccalauréat reform went ahead.

== Organization ==
=== Unions ===
Banner at a protest: "Sorry to bother you, we just want a future"

Student and trade unions have played a major role in the protests. The Union Syndicale Lycéenne's national call on 29 September named four grievances—lack of teachers and staff, "dilapidated lycées", overloaded timetables and classes, and the stress caused by Parcoursup. Rani said classes sometimes held 32 to 35 pupils and asked protesters to remain peaceful. The union later called an "Act Two" on 1 October, and a further day of action on 6 October. On RTL on 30 September, Rani said dialogue had been "abandoned", and that it was for the minister to take the first step. The Union syndicale lycéenne and Union étudiante called for joint mobilization by secondary-school and university students on 1 October. Reporting on the demonstrations that day, Le Monde described a heterogeneous movement involving students seeking improved educational conditions as well as people involved in confrontations. It also reported that some participants were not pupils of the schools outside which they gathered. Following their meeting with Education Minister Édouard Geffray on 2 October, student union leaders voiced their dissatisfaction with the government's response and called for the mobilization to continue. The USL announced further demonstrations for 6 October, with several trade-union confederations, including the General Confederation of Labour (CGT) trade union, announcing that they would join the action. Other supporting trade union confederations included the Workers' Force (FO), National Union of Autonomous Trade Unions (UNSA), French Democratic Confederation of Labour (CFDT), Solidaires, French Confederation of Christian Workers (CFTC), General Confederation of Executives (CGC) and Confédération Paysanne. The teachers' unions Unitary Trade Union Federation (FSU) and National Union of Independent Colleges and High Schools (SNALC) called for strikes and supported the protests as well.

Other lycée student unions supporting student mobilization and protests included the National High School Student Movement, the Student Union, Étudiants Musulmans de France (EMF) and the "Les Lycéens!" union.

=== Political parties ===
The protests gained support from left-wing political parties, trade unions, student associations. French government officials accused the radical left, particularly those associated with La France Insoumise (LFI), of contributing to the escalation of the riots.

A French police intelligence assessment attributed some school blockades in Seine-Saint-Denis to the influence of far-left political and trade union activists.

La France Insoumise (LFI) representatives attended demonstrations. Jean-Luc Mélenchon stated that the party supported nonviolent protest and has participated in protests on 24 October.

=== Others ===
The yellow vests movement began in 2018 as a protest against fuel taxes and the rising cost of living and has since returned as a symbol for the 2026 protests. The demonstrations lacked a single organizational leadership, yet they gave voice to diverse forms of social discontent, with grievances including cost of living, education, public spending, social inequality, and political corruption.

== Timeline ==
=== Emergence of the protests ===
On 15 September, workers, including fishermen, police officers, farmers, construction workers, energy workers, medical workers, university staff and other groups participated in demonstrations. On 17 September, fishermen took their boats and blockaded two ports in Nice and Sète, obstructing maritime traffic. Others burned tires and wooden pallets on roads to petrol depots in Frontignan, preventing access. On social media, the 2018 yellow vests movement saw a resurgence, with messages calling for a general mobilization on 17 October being shared.

Soon after the beginning of the new school year in September, several issues with the school infrastructure prompted students in French Guiana to block the Felix Éboué high school in Cayenne, denouncing poor conditions. In Mayotte, parents together with teachers and students have been blocking access to the lycee of the North of Acoua since the end of August, a movement which was "largely ignored" by mass media in metropolitan France.

In metropolitan France, the mobilization began on 21 September at the Lycée Antoine-de-Saint-Exupéry in Créteil, a commune in the suburbs of Paris. The day after a teachers' strike on 17 September against lack of resources and staff, pupils organized a protest. Pupils said they felt neglected by the Ministry of National Education and cited lack of resources and staff, overcrowded classes, and rooms short of tables.

An academic source and the USL later presented that mobilization as the start of the national movement.

Contemporaneous reports, including Le Monde and an account by actu.fr on 24 September, dated the spreading movement to Monday, 21 September at the same lycée, where several teaching posts were unfilled. The Créteil rectorate said on 24 September that demands still varied by school.

Through 25 September, the spread stayed local. Actu.fr said about 10 lycées were affected by 24 September, mainly in Seine-Saint-Denis and Val-de-Marne, and described a copycat effect on social networks. That morning, pupils tried to block the entrance of the Lycée Auguste-Blanqui in Saint-Ouen until late morning. An academy spokesperson told AFP there had been a gathering and material damage but no injuries. Police dispersed the crowd without incident.

On 25 September, the Créteil rectorate said the movement was gaining momentum and counted "a good dozen" lycées blocked, above all in Seine-Saint-Denis and Val-de-Marne. It said some mobilizations had produced crowds and material damage. The Versailles rectorate reported disruption at three of 62 lycées in Essonne and mobilizations at five of 65 in Hauts-de-Seine. Le Monde later wrote that about 60 Paris-region lycées were disrupted on 24 and 25 September, that about 12 percent of the 468 public lycées saw attempted blockades, and that around 10 were actually blocked. Rani told AFP that it had started at Saint-Exupéry and "spread very quickly", and cited shortages of education assistants, nurses and social workers.

=== 28–30 September ===
On 28 September, Lecornu said escalation would be "irresponsible" and wrote that fireworks, fires, and violence near high schools endangered pupils, staff, and police. Interior Minister Laurent Nuñez said 164 people had been arrested that day, 180 schools were affected, and 12 security officers, 12 students, and three staff were injured.

On 29 September, the Education Ministry said about 400 of the roughly 3,700 lycées were disrupted. Nuñez told BFM TV that 440 people had been detained, most of them minors. CNN published photographs of police firing tear gas at the Lycée César-Baggio in Lille. In Saint-Denis, La France Insoumise (LFI) mayor Bally Bagayoko stood with pupils outside the Lycée Paul-Éluard. On BFM on 29 September he said that violence could, at a given moment, be legitimate. On 30 September, Paris police prefect Patrice Faure referred him to the Bobigny prosecutor, under article 40 of the French code of criminal procedure, for suspected provocation to commit an offence. On 1 October, Bagayoko told France Info that he stood by the remarks and called for de-escalation. Politician Jean-Luc Mélenchon wrote that the pupils were harmless, that the crackdown had a racist undertone, and that LFI activists should "step in" between pupils and police.

On 30 September, Nuñez said 625 people were detained, 83 police and gendarmes were wounded, and 356 schools were affected. He described projectiles, attempted arson, and what he called urban violence. Education Minister Édouard Geffray said 119 pupils and staff had been injured since the protests began. In Tours, a young person was hospitalized with head injuries.

=== 1 October ===
On 1 October, university students joined the blockades. The Union étudiante reported about 30 campus blockades, including Paris Cité, Sorbonne University, Strasbourg, Montpellier, Lyon, and Rennes. France Info added Sciences Po Rennes, the University of Rennes and the Université de Bretagne-Occidentale, and said students at the University of Montpellier Paul Valéry and Aix-Marseille University were mobilized. Police counts that morning were lower than the evening total: 340 actions and 169 blockades by mid-morning, according to franceinfo. The evening Interior Ministry figure was 1,027 lycées affected, 222 blockaded, and 1,949 arrests. The Guardian reported nearly 3,000 lycée students detained since the start, including the Thursday figure.

Lecornu held an interministerial crisis meeting and told ministers to cancel travel. His office said the violence made it nearly impossible to keep schools open safely, and that intelligence services described the movement as "an operation organized by LFI and its proxies on the far left". LFI coordinator Manuel Bompard said the government was "sinking into conspiracism" and called the mobilization spontaneous.

Geffray ordered remote classes in areas where damage or blockages made buildings unsafe, and said that slightly over 400 establishments would be closed on 2 October. That evening the Interior Ministry said prefects had banned demonstrations outside the closed lycées. Paris police prefect Patrice Faure banned gatherings at 13 closed Paris schools.

=== 2 October ===
Police at a protest in Perpignan, 2 October

About 400 of France's roughly 3,700 lycées were closed on the orders of the prefects, with many switching to distance learning. Every prefect banned gatherings outside lycées closed that day. In Paris, the prefect of police, Patrice Faure, banned gatherings around 13 named closed lycées.

By midday, the Ministry of National Education said 564 establishments "have been or are the subject of actions or disruptions since the start of the day". The Île-de-France region said 55 lycées were "the scene of violence, clashes and damage". Mobilization was widely reported to be lower than on 1 October, but fires, fireworks, and clashes continued.

On BFM TV that morning, Education Minister Édouard Geffray said 1,207 lycées had been disrupted or blockaded on Thursday, that more than 100 had suffered "severe damage" since the start of the week, and that 65 education staff had been injured, including 40 headteachers. He said a staff flat in a Lyon lycée had been ransacked by people from outside the school, repeated that the movement had been "taken hostage by ultra-violent groups", and told parents that "in the street, children are in danger". At 09:00, he met with education unions, the Union syndicale lycéenne, parents' groups, and elected members of the Conseil national de la vie lycéenne. After the meeting, SNES-FSU general secretary Sophie Vénétitay said there were still "no guarantees" and called a strike for the following Tuesday in support of the lycée demands. Justice Minister Gérald Darmanin told prosecutors to seek parental civil liability so families would pay for damage caused by their children.

A bin fire spread to the façade of the lycée professionnel Gaston-Bachelard in the 13th arrondissement of Paris early in the morning; the entrance windows blew out, and the Brigade de sapeurs-pompiers de Paris extinguished the blaze at about 07:55. Firefighters also put out a fire at the gate of the lycée Léonard-de-Vinci in the 15th. BFM TV filmed the charred entrance door of the lycée Roger-Verlomme, also on the 15th; Le Figaro reported that the fire followed a firework aimed at the door, that several bicycles burned, and that firefighters arrived within about two minutes. Le Parisien reported fireworks outside the lycée professionnel Beaugrenelle on rue Saint-Charles and a pallet-and-bin fire that firefighters put out shortly before 09:00. An Île-de-France regional employee was injured and treated by firefighters at the lycée Molière in the 16th arrondissement. Around midday, a barricade of bins was burning at Place de la Nation, and police used tear gas. The Île-de-France region also listed a serious fire at the lycée Henri-Moissan in Meaux. RTL quoted the headteacher as saying the façade, entrance hall, part of the canteen and some boarding rooms had burned, and that the damage ran into millions of euros. France Télévisions authenticated images of a fire outside a school in Montigny-lès-Metz.

High school student mobilization day in Perpignan, 2 October 2026

At the lycée Bougainville in Nantes, fireworks and burning bins met the morning opening; police and CRS cleared several blockade attempts around 08:00, and Le Figaro reported 10 arrests nearby, one of a youth carrying a metal bar. In Rennes, bin-and-barrier barricades blocked traffic near the lycée Jean-Macé from about 08:30, with further tensions at Émile-Zola and Joliot-Curie; Agence France-Presse reported a barricade and a Palestinian flag on a main road. In Quimper, police used tear gas to disperse a blockade of several hundred people at the lycée Chaptal.

In Lyon, fireworks around 10:00 led to tear gas in the Foch district beside the lycée Édouard-Herriot; 44 establishments in the Rhône were closed, and a crowd remained outside the still-open lycée Ampère. In the Bordeaux academy, 18 lycées were closed and about 6,000 pupils were reported mobilized in Bordeaux, Mérignac, Bègles, Langon and Libourne; the authorities reported five police officers, one firefighter and four pupils injured, and two teachers confronted at their schools. In the Drôme, Agence France-Presse reported nine arrests and a policewoman injured in the knee during an intervention at a Montélimar lycée and taken to hospital. In Metz, ICI Lorraine reported fireworks and tear gas at the lycée Fabert early in the morning, one arrest outside the school, and a bin fire at the lycée professionnel Léonard-de-Vinci in Montigny-lès-Metz that licked the building before firefighters put it out. Further clashes and at least one arrest were reported at midday at the entrance of the university campus.

In Évreux, several hundred people gathered outside the lycée Aristide-Briand from 08:00 onward. Paris-Normandie reported a washing machine set alight, gates forced, windows broken and repeated fireworks, and quoted prefect Xavier Delarue denouncing "urban violence". France 3 Normandie reported that Delarue said groups had tried to force the entrance in order to burn the lycée, with Molotov cocktails and projectiles, and that the headteacher of another Évreux lycée said Aristide-Briand had suffered fireworks being used as projectiles and an intrusion that succeeded.

In La Ciotat, the local site Var Actu reported that a physics teacher at the lycée de la Méditerranée was hit in the face with the contents of a bottle described as containing petrol, briefly blinded, and then kicked, after he tried to put out a fire lit near a tree at about 08:25. It said the suspected teenager was caught and arrested. A live blog citing Le Figaro described the victim as the headteacher, "doused with petrol and beaten" while trying to calm a tense blockade.

A Friday claim that staff at the lycée Victor-Hugo in Marseille, beside Gare Saint-Charles, had been doused with petrol refers to Thursday 1 October, not a new attack. Franceinfo reported on 2 October that the lycée was closed after Thursday's clashes, that the entrance door was charred, and that the management team had been splashed with petrol. La Provence reported the rectorat's correction: the headteachers "were not directly targeted by youths who doused them" but were splashed while people poured petrol into bins. The Provence-Alpes-Côte d'Azur region had said a headteacher, a deputy head, a general secretary and a team leader were attacked and doused. BFM Marseille reported that the prefecture and the rectorat said they would file a complaint, and that the damaged door had to be made safe.

Separately on 2 October, Interior Minister Laurent Nuñez said images of "rare violence" showed a police officer in Belfort deliberately targeted, thrown to the ground and beaten, including to the head, by masked people in black on the margins of the lycée blockades. The officer lost consciousness and was hospitalized; Nuñez said his condition was no longer a major concern. The Belfort prosecutor opened an investigation for attempted murder of a person holding public authority. France Info's photograph of the intervention is dated 1 October, so the beating itself may predate the Friday announcement.

No national arrest totals for 2 October had been published by early afternoon. The latest Interior Ministry count remained Thursday's: 1,949 arrests, with 305 police and gendarmes injured that day, and 1,793 people placed in custody since Monday, about 90 percent of them minors.

=== 5 October ===
On 5 October, 400 to 500 schools across France were partially or totally closed. Geffray said lessons were "totally or partly suspended" because security conditions "have not been fulfilled". He added that 24 schools had been "burned or ransacked" since the protests began.

During the high-school mobilization, the Lycée des métiers Nicolas-Louis-Vauquelin in Paris's 13th arrondissement was targeted by a group of about ten youths wearing hoods, masks and black clothing. According to the head teacher, Carole Zerbib, and several pupils, the masked youths were not students at the school. It was the first call to blockade the school since the movement began.

Shortly before 8:00 a.m., as pupils were entering, fireworks were fired and a first fire was started in front of the metal door. Staff put that fire out. About 100 pupils were confined inside and moved upstairs. The group piled bins, bulky rubbish and bicycles against the entrance, brought over a sofa, smashed windows and tried to force the door, which held. After police and firefighters had left, the group returned around 9:00 a.m. and started two further fires at the doors with a flammable liquid, feeding them with the debris. Staff tried to extinguish the flames from inside, through the letter slot, and failed. Firefighters put out the last fire around 9:30 a.m. Pupils were evacuated shortly before 10:00 a.m. and sent home. The Paris education authority reported three fire starts, told parents not to come near the school, and classes were cancelled for the day.

At about 10:30 or 11:00 a.m. in Lens, outside the Lycée professionnel Auguste-Béhal, a 15-year-old pupil in seconde had his hand blown off by a police stun grenade during a blockade. Between 200 and 250 students were gathered and the prefect of Pas-de-Calais, François-Xavier Lauch, said some of them had thrown projectiles at police. Lauch and the prosecutor of Béthune, Étienne Thieffry, confirmed the injury, saying that the boy was taken to a hospital in Lille and that his life was not in danger. The IGPN was seized. A police source told Le Figaro that he had picked up a dispersal grenade thrown by the CRS in order to throw it back, and that it exploded in his hand. The authorities said the exact circumstances still had to be established.

=== 6 October ===
On 6 October, the third nationwide day of mobilization began, with high school students and university students joining demonstrations and blockades across France. Several high schools and university campuses were blocked from early morning, including the Sorbonne in Paris, while dozens of demonstrations were expected across the country. In Lyon, police dispersed masked people who had blocked a tramway, with early clashes reported. The mobilization was also joined by education-sector and labour organizations, including the CGT. Fabien Roussel, national secretary of the French Communist Party (PCF), proposed the "Youth Plan 2027–2032" at a press conference (shortly before he left to join students on the streets), which, among many measures, included monetary contributions to hiring teachers and improving school infrastructure, decreasing school hours contributing to stress, and strengthening student democracy. Also attending were leaders of the Union of Communist Students and the Mouvement Jeunes Communistes de France.

Teachers and parents participated in the movement. The High School Students Union stated that around 1,800 high schools were either blockaded or would close for the day, and protests were reported in Marseille, Nantes, and Lyon, where the demonstrations started peacefully.

Protests on 6 October 2026

Bayonne

Belfort

Paris

Perpignan

=== 7 October ===
Iran's ambassador was summoned to the French foreign ministry over what the latter described as a "disinformation campaign" conducted by official accounts of the Iranian foreign ministry. The rebuke came after Iran accused France of "extensive and flagrant human rights violations" by police and security forces during the protests.

=== 8 October ===
On 8 October, the student movement held a fourth nationwide day of action. The Interior Ministry counted 71,500 participants at marches, including 24,500 in Paris. A further 55,000 young people took part in demonstrations outside schools, according to the report. Student and university organizations called a fifth day of action for 13 October.

=== 13 October ===
Call to action leaflet by the yellow vests, Grenoble, 16 October 2026.

For the fifth nationwide day of action, the Interior Ministry counted 161,500 participants nationally, while the youth inter-union estimated 480,000; the ministry counted 41,500 people in two Paris marches. Swedish climate activist Greta Thunberg visited demonstrators outside Lycée Paul-Éluard in Saint-Denis. The Education Ministry said 214 schools were closed. Education Minister Édouard Geffray said the deployment of 3,000 substitute teachers to the most affected schools had begun.

=== 16 October ===
By 16 October, Geffray said around 160 schools remained blocked, while he described roughly one-third of the 3,700 lycées as having been significantly disrupted during the movement. Student activists said the start of school holidays would remove blockades as a tactic, and planned to hold assemblies during the break. The website of the conservative Les Républicains party was hacked. The website was taken over by a message displaying a call to action to join the protests on 17 October.

=== 17 October ===
Demonstrators atop the Monument à la République, dressed in a yellow vest, 17 October 2026

The Hôtel de Ville in Limoges collapsing in flames, 17 October 2026

On 17 October, protests escalated as student organizations converged with nationwide demonstrations against the cost of living and fuel prices, called by trade unions and the yellow vests movement. The protests brought together a wide array of groups—former yellow vest members, climate campaigners, trade unionists, students protesters, and farmers. Interior Minister Laurent Nuñez said 110 marches drew 550,000 participants, including 110,000 in Paris; organizers estimated 800,000. The Associated Press reported about 400 arrests during the day. Prime Minister Sébastien Lecornu later said 1,200 people had been arrested and 150 police officers and gendarmes injured.

Marches and demonstrations were held in cities across France, mainly progressing without incident for the day. However, a large crowd of demonstrators gathered around Place de la République, Paris and a riot occurred. Vehicles were set alight and shops were looted by thieves. The 400-piece Orchestre du Nouveau Monde playing the The Hanging Tree from The Hunger Games in support was interrupted mid-performance by tear gas attacks from riot police after barely 20 minutes, forcing them to abandon the performance. Extinction Rebellion activists climbed the Monument à la République and placed a giant yellow vest over the statue of Marianne, bearing the words «1961, la police noie les Algérien‑nes / 2026, la police mutile les lycéen‑nes» ("1961, the police drown Algerians / 2026, the police mutilate high school students"), in reference to the 1961 Paris massacre.

Storefront of a Nébuleuse Bijoux location in Paris, after being looted, 17 October 2026

In Lyon, where about 20,000 people marched, hooded individuals were seen vandalizing a branch of the tourist office, tearing letters from its sign and damaging the premises. The tourist office was set on fire by several individuals. In Marseille, shops and a municipal police station were damaged, and protesters briefly entered the lobby of the Hôtel de Ville.

In Limoges, the historic Hôtel de Ville was set ablaze during the evening; the fire continued into the following morning and partially destroyed the 19th-century building.

A demonstrator lost a hand in Saint-Étienne; Nuñez said an investigation had opened and did not confirm reports that the injury was caused by a police grenade. In spite of the violent incidents that occurred, French authorities stated that the "vast majority" of protesters had been demonstrating peacefully.

Protests on 17 October 2026

Marching protesters in Aix-en-Provence

A8 autoroute blockade

Looted store in Paris

=== 18 October ===
By the morning, authorities reported that about 1,800 people had been arrested nationwide, including 855 in the Paris region, following clashes and looting during the previous day's demonstrations and overnight. The government planned an emergency meeting on the response and President Emmanuel Macron was due to address the public that evening. Macron did not blame the protesters, but the "unbridled violence on ultra-left factions and delinquents" taking advantage of the protests to damage private and public property.

=== 19 October ===
On 19 October, the BBC reported that the Interior Ministry said about 2,400 people had been arrested and about 1,000 police officers injured, seven seriously, during Saturday's demonstrations. The BBC also reported that looting and clashes continued on a smaller scale in Paris and Lyon on Sunday, following demonstrations attended by about 550,000 people, which were mostly peaceful. Curfews were imposed in several cities, including Paris, with Prime Minister Sébastien Lecornu stating that they would be "partial" and "very locally limited" in scope.

=== 22 October ===
On 22 October, city officials in Lyon and Marseille announced a complete ban on protests on 24 October to eliminate any potential for a repeat of the events that occurred on 17 October. Nice and Toulon announced similar bans. Macron announced his intention to ban all "illegitimate" protests. Even demonstrations from organizations deemed legitimate would have to be examined and approved before going ahead, and they could have their routes changed by the government. These bans and restrictions have faced public scrutiny for potentially infringing on the constitutionally-enshrined right to protest, and student groups vowed to continue organizing. An attempted ban on marches in Paris for 22 October was overturned by an administrative court.

=== 23 October ===
Curfew at Les Halles in Paris, 23 October 2026

During a press conference French Interior Minister Nuñez announced that about 70,000 police officers and gendarmes would be deployed, along with helicopters, armored vehicles, and water cannons in preparations for planned protests the next day. Additional statements were made by the Culture Ministry, that the Louvre, the Orsay and Picasso museums as well as the Grand Palais would be closed, while highlighting the need to ensure visitor and staff safety and preservation of the artworks. Art Basel Paris was opened to the public for the day, with planned protests resulting in the cancelation of the upcoming weekend program. Shopkeepers boarded up their storefronts to prevent property damage and more than 20 metro stations were shut as a precaution.

=== 24 October ===
Protesters in Paris, 24 October 2026

The yellow vests held "Act II" of the protests on 24 October. They made several appeals including the ability to live with dignity, right to assemble, condemnation of police brutality, and the resignation of president Emmanuel Macron.

On 24 October, about 110,000 protesters gathered in Paris and marched on a planned route from Porte d’Italie to Porte de Vincennes, according to the Interior Ministry, while the CGT estimated the turnout at 250,000. The march was attended by La France Insoumise leader Jean-Luc Mélenchon. The march continued peacefully until the end when a crowd of about 500 hooded youths began attacking with thrown objects and firework projectiles. Police responded by firing tear gas and riot guns indiscriminately and launched water cannons to disperse them. A gendarmerie helicopter was also deployed to search for rioters.

In Orléans, the far-right National Rally leader Marine Le Pen held a national congress. Protesters, including trade union leaders, the mayor of Saint-Denis Bally Bagayoko, and other left-wing politicians, marched in opposition to her. In Marseille, youths dragged large metal sheets to block a street, set fire to garbage bins, and threw objects at riot police. Demonstrations and clashes also occurred in other cities, including Nice, Lyon, Orléans, Nantes, Dijon, Toulouse, Bordeaux, Grenoble, Clermont-Ferrand, Lille, Rennes and elsewhere. France’s Interior Ministry says at least 410,000 people marched in the protests and over 1,000 people were arrested, while the CGT put the number of protesters at 800,000.

Police gathered in Cours de Vincennes, Paris, 24 October 2026

=== 25 October ===
Labor unions have accused Emmanuel Macron of making protesters liable for vandalism and damage by introducing a bill making protestors liable for up to 10,000 euros from vandalism and damages, originally drafted as a response to the Paris Saint-Germain victory riots in May 2026. Rights groups and lawyers have criticized the bill, by saying that it takes away the basic right to demonstrate.

=== 26 October ===
French minister Sebastian Lecornu promised to meet student protesters on the afternoon of 26 October, following Macron's promised response for better education standards and funding. However, many student protesters rejected the response.

=== 27 October ===
On 27 October, the French parliament's upper house passed an expanded bill, by a vote of 229 to 105. Interior Minister Laurent Nunez has addressed the "urgency" of the bill following damages caused by the 17 October riots.

=== 31 October ===
The yellow vests held "Act III" on 31 October, planning sit-ins in front of the National Assembly and town halls. Their appeals included an end to the restrictions on protesting and police brutality and the resignation of Macron. Beyond the appeals, they also demanded representation. The sit-ins were preceded by casserole protests on 30 October. The French government rejected a march from the Bastille to Place de la Nation, and moved it away to Porte De Bagnolet to Porte de Charenton. Interior minister Nuñez warned of a “very high risk” of disorder, deploying about 70,000 police and gendarmes, including elite units, vehicles, and aircraft preemptively. Authorities, fearing Halloween celebrations would give demonstrators an opportunity to conceal their identities and bring weapons, announced a ban of such articles. Paris police carried out more than 1,200 checks at railway stations and nearby areas to confiscate weapons. More than 40 metro stations in Paris were closed.

Across the country, about 320,000 people participated in 150 demonstrations. In the afternoon, demonstrations were relatively peaceful. Despite the ban, some arrived in Halloween costumes, threw treats, sung and played festive music. In Paris, approximately 70,000 people marched, which passed smoothly. However, at Porte de Charenton, a group of protesters refused to disperse despite water cannons and tear gas. Protesters used hammers to pry up the pavement, hurling cobblestones at the police. Violence escalated sharply as incendiary weapons were thrown at police, vehicles and buildings. Masked groups launched fireworks at officers near the Eiffel Tower, causing tourists to flee. Police responded by firing tear gas at demonstrators and blocking several roads in Paris. A homemade petrol bomb was thrown at a group of around 15 gendarmes, setting them on fire. Several people attempted to break into city centres. Clashes also occurred in Marseille, Grenoble, Lyon, Toulouse, and Rennes. Laurent Nuñez described the violence as “extraordinary” and the bombing as "attempted murder", opening an investigation into the attackers. The Ministry of the Interior reported 779 arrests nationwide that day.

Protests on 31 October 2026

Sit-in around the Fontaine de la Rotonde

Protesters in Sens, Yonne

Face off with police, Aix-en-Provence

=== 1–3 November ===
Garbage bin barricade of Lycée Jules Ferry, Paris, 3 November 2026

"Les Lycéens!" called for school blockades alongside the yellow vests. After returning to school from their two-week autumn break, tens of thousands of students demanded renovations, taking part in marches and blockades in protest. On 2 November, students blockaded 42 high schools with their bodies, garbage bins, bicycles and other objects. On 3 November, at least 48 out of France's 3,700 high schools across the country, along with 51 higher education institutions out of 184 were disrupted. Tensions arose between school staff and students. A school was set on fire in Nantes, resulting in three students being arrested. Education minister Édouard Geffray condemned the blockades and violent attacks, saying the students needed to study for exams.

=== 5 November ===
Strikers on the Monument à la République, 5 November 2026

On 5 November, later dubbed "Black Thursday", L'intersyndicale organized a general strike comprising all major unions. The call was supported by the yellow vests, political activists and student protesters. The CGT demanded that the minimum wage be increased by 10% immediately, while the CFDT demanded that the monthly wage be increased by €100. Student unions demanded a $10 billion increase to the education budget, a $1.5 billion investment in school infrastructure and 250,000 additional university spots. The yellow vests also demanded the resignation of president Emmanuel Macron. Macron convened a defence and security meeting on 4 November to prepare for the strike. Laurent Nuñez vowed "an extremely firm response" and deployed 70,000 police officers backed by armored vehicles, helicopters and drones to contain the protests.

Effigy of Marianne being carried through Paris, 5 November 2026

The education, healthcare and public transportation sectors were the most affected. The Ministry of Public Action and Accounts reported that an estimated 9.89 percent of civil servants participated in the strikes, along with 4.6 percent of local government workers and 3.93 percent of public hospital staff. More than 12 percent of the education ministry's one million employees went on strike, including an estimated 17.54 percent of public schoolteachers. All four major unions at the state-owned SNCF (CGT-Cheminots, UNSA-Ferroviaire, SUD-Rail and CFDT-Cheminots) went on strike, causing at least four in 10 trains to be cancelled that day. RATP closed 25 metro stations in Paris. DGAC air traffic controllers also went on strike, resulting in several flight delays. Energy workers were called to halt production at oil refineries and nuclear power plants. Nuclear power generation fell by about 2.4 gigawatts. Private sector employees also went on strike to protest against low wages, job cuts, and working conditions.

March in Paris, 5 November 2026

In Paris, protesters marched along the Boulevard Voltaire from Place de la République to Place de la Nation. The march was largely peaceful, with balloons, elaborately designed floats and an effigy of Marianne being paraded through the crowd. The Orchestre du Nouveau Monde returned to Place de la Républic and performed The Hanging Tree from The Hunger Games for the protesters. Presidential candidate Raphaël Glucksmann attempted to participate in the march but was forced to leave after being rejected by protesters. Police clashed with protesters, charging them and ripping away their banners. The Eiffel Tower and Arc de Triomphe were closed during the protests.

Strikes affected 19 percent of schools, 18 percent of colleges and a third of universities, causing disruptions and closures across the country. Students blockaded a major street in Paris and at least 81 schools. The Lycée Françoise in Tournefeuille was evacuated and set on fire after it was hit by fireworks. Education minister Édouard Geffray condemned the attack as "criminal behaviour", describing it as an "absolute scandal".

In Lyon, about 800 black bloc protesters shouting anti-police slogans were charged by riot police and shot with water cannons and tear gas. In Rennes, "masked individuals" took over the march, with several dozen being arrested after smashing up a hotel and attacking police and unionists. Others attempted to erect barricades, set fire to garbage bins and threw metal pétanque balls at police. An effigy of a police officer was burned in Strasbourg during a protest. Clashes also occurred in Nantes, Pau and Orléans. The Ministry of the Interior reported that approximately 575,000 people participated in over 200 demonstrations across the country, the largest since the start of the protests. The CGT put the number of participants at around 1.57 million. At least 448 people were detained, while 53 police officers were injured and 86 "fire-related interventions" occurred.

Protests on 5 November 2026

March in Reims

Belfort

Strike in Aix-en-Provence

=== 6–7 November ===
Blockade of the Faculty of Law and Political Science at Aix-Marseille University, Aix-en-Provence, 6 November 2026

The yellow vests called for the continuation of strikes and blockades through 6 and 7 November. On 7 November, student groups and trade unions called for a march from Place de la République in central Paris to Place de la Nation "against the high cost of living and in support of young people". The yellow vests refused to join, instead planning a large rally at Place de la Concorde, near several government buildings, including the presidential Élysée Palace and National Assembly. The Paris Police Prefecture banned the rally due to the "risk of a disturbance to public order", but the yellow vests urged "mass disobedience" if authorities stopped them from gathering.

Laurent Nuñez deployed 70,000 police officers to disperse the protests. Place de la Concorde was strictly locked down with police vehicles. Around 100 protesters arrived to Place de la Concorde but the rally failed after they were surrounded by police, with yellow vests coordinator Benjamin Ball and spokeswoman Solene Azelma Sigaux being arrested in front of the National Assembly. Paris police performed almost 40,000 stops-and-searches and train station checks before and during the protests. The orchestra Manif'ique performed for the march at Place de la République. The march proceeded quickly and peacefully, though police used baton charges, tear gas and stun grenades to drive away remaining protesters. A group of about 200 "violent individuals" also attacked police officers who were arresting a man that set fire to a garbage bin during the clashes. In Lyon, police fired tear gas to disperse several hundred people who had blocked a road. The Ministry of the Interior reported that approximately 146,000 people took part in the protests, including 46,000 in Paris, and that at least 350 were arrested. Student unions claimed that at least 250,000 people participated, with around 75,000 in Paris.

=== 9 November ===
Prime minister Sébastien Lecornu held a social conference with employers and unions in the Hôtel Matignon. The conference achieved an extra 0.6% minimum wage increase advanced to 1 December; combined with a regular 1% increase, it would raise the monthly wage from €1,478 to €1,502. Lecornu remarked, "This is the second-biggest increase in 20 years, so it should not be held in contempt," however CGT head Sophie Binet described it as "crumbs", adding "€5 is one kilo of tomatoes," and "We didn't come here to beg for ‌alms.", and by CFDT head Marylise Leon as "insufficient".

=== 10 November ===
Dissatisfied with the results of Lecornu's social conference, student protesters, teachers and unionists protested. Organizers planned two marches in Paris, one from Place de la Bastille to Pitié-Salpêtrière Hospital and another from the Panthéon to Porte d'Italie. The march from Place de la Bastille, called by Interfac Île-de-France and Île-de-France Regional Student Coordination was banned and replaced with a gathering. According to the education ministry, students blocked the entrances to 49 of the country's 3,700 high schools. Fireworks were set off inside two secondary schools in Seine-et-Marne and police arrested five people in Le Havre and Rouen in Normandy.

=== 14 November ===
The yellow vests held "Act V" on 14 November, supported by unions and student protesters. Laurent Nuñez deployed 70,000 police officers and gendarmes, along with vehicles and aircraft. Twenty-one Paris metro stations were closed.

A volunteer orchestra gathered in Place de la République as thousands of students marched to Place de la Nation, calling for more investments in education. Others protested the rising cost of living, the social conference, education standards, child and youth rights and expressed opposition to the proposed Bill 691, which they dubbed a "licence to kill". Protesters echoed Sophie Binet's words, chanting "We don’t need crumbs—we want the entire bakery". Sebastien Lecornu responded by saying, "We made realistic and honest promises considering fiscal difficulties".

The interior ministry described the protests as 'calm and under control', with many being successfully dispersed. However, some demonstrators broke off and attempted to form an illegitimate march in Paris, but were driven back by riot police. Despite bans on protesting, about 3,500 people still took to the streets in Marseille. Police used tear gas and water cannons against protesters while fires were set in a popular local square. Tear gas was also used in Nantes, Paris and Bordeaux. In Lyon, about 8,000 people participated, with a group of journalists being assaulted by protesters according to the interior ministry. Clashes also occurred in Grenoble, Bordeaux, Montpellier, Toulouse and Lille. According to the interior ministry, around 106,000 protested nationwide, including 24,000 in Paris. Student unions put the number of demonstrators at 200,000, with almost 100,000 in the capital. The ministry reported that 219 people had been detained and Paris prosecutors said 45 were arrested in the capital.

Protests on 14 November 2026

Valenciennes

Trojan Horse float in Paris

Monument à la République

=== 17 November ===
Strike in Marseille, 17 November 2026

Activists in Marseille, 17 November 2026

In protest of the social conference held by Sebastien Lecornu, L'intersyndicale called for France's 5.8 million public sector employees to mobilize in another nationwide strike. Unions pushed for general pay raises, especially among public sector employees as their pay index point had not increased in four years. The strike coincided with the eighth anniversary of the yellow vests, who organized 5 days of protests in commemoration. Laurent Nuñez deployed security forces and authorities temporarily banned the sale of firecrackers.

In the civil service, the strike rate reached 2.59 percent. The education ministry reported an average strike rate of 3.14 percent in national education and a rate of 3.76 percent among teachers. School support staff were more involved in the strikes with about 9.28 percent participating. Strikes by rail workers caused "minor to major disruption" on several railway lines. Other sectors included postal services, telecommunications, energy, healthcare and social care workers and others.

Student protesters in Paris, 17 November 2026

Protesters, comprised mostly of unionists and students, marched from Place de la Nation to Place d'Italie in Paris. Organizers desired a "joyous and festive" occasion; the march was majorly peaceful and accompanied by music. About 1,200 out of 13,000 Compagnies Républicaines de Sécurité (CRS) riot police called to suppress the protests were absent due to "consultations". Officers described experiencing overwork, violent attacks and isolation from their families for weeks, which forced them to schedule consultations for "psychosocial troubles". The absenteeism affected 30 out of 63 CRS companies, with some unable to operate due to the vacancies. Alliance Police Nationale spokesperson Yoann Maras commented, "This is a sign of a general sense of exasperation among riot police, who have been exhausted and overworked since the end of September. The interior minister was warned. He knew this would happen."

The ‌interior ministry reported 146,000 participants around the country, including ‌28,000 in Paris. The CGT said more than 500,000 people nationwide took part in the protests, including at least 175,000 in Paris.

Protests on 17 November 2026

Teachers strike in Marseille

Dockworkers strike in Marseille

March in Paris

=== 18 November ===
After the exhaustion seen on 17 November, the Alliance Police Nationale union held a rally at Place Beauvau, outside the Ministry of the Interior. The union demanded their risk allowance raised from 28.8% to at least 35%. Nuñez proposed raising the rate to 33.5% in stages by 2029, starting in April 2027. The police said it fell short of their demands.

=== 20 November ===
On November 20, France's upper house of parliament voted 205 to 110 in favor of Bill 691, which presumes an officer's use of force as lawful unless evidence shows otherwise. Opponents branded it a "licence to kill", while lawmakers, human rights groups and trade unions voiced strong opposition to the law. Left-wing parliamentary blocs announced that they will ask the Constitutional Council to review the law before it takes effect.

=== 21 November ===
As a part of their eighth anniversary celebration, the yellow vests held a "Act VI" protest in coordination with wider protests in 7 European countries. Along with trade unions, student protesters and political activists, the right to housing movement also joined the protests. Laurent Nuñez deployed 70,000 security forces and instructed regional prefects to remain "particularly vigilant regarding the groups most hostile to law enforcement" following the adoption of Bill 691. Sixteen metro stations were closed.

In Paris, several thousand demonstrators converged on Place de la République, accompanied by an orchestra, food trucks and people in costumes with a festive atmosphere. They marched through the city along Boulevard Voltaire to Place de la Nation. The interior ministry described the demonstration as "generally calm".

In Marseille, 4,600 people protested, according to police, which remained peaceful. However, an unauthorized demonstration split from the procession. In Lille, about 5,000 people gathered, singing along to an orchestra. In Lyon, where protesting was banned, several unauthorized marches attempted to reach the city center, but were dispersed by tear gas. Some attempted to set fire to vehicles and bins.

Interior ministry reported around 82,500 people participated in protests around ‌the country, including 21,500 in Paris, noting that the protests had “clearly diminished”. Organizers put the figure at 150,000, with 45,000 in the capital.

== International ==
=== Belgium ===
On 1 October, the mobilization was echoed in Liège, Belgium. The Liège police said a call on social media brought pupils, at about 8 a.m., to five schools: the Athénée de Fragnée, Saint-Laurent, Saint-Sépulcre, Marie-Thérèse, and Liège-Atlas. The police said eggs, apples, barriers, and firecrackers were thrown at the schools and at officers, and that one member of a school's management was physically attacked. RTBF reported a fire near the Institut Marie-Thérèse, on rue Hors-Château, into which scooters and barriers were thrown, road signs and street furniture torn up, and some vehicles damaged. It reported that a glass door at the Collège Saint-Barthélemy was smashed with an iron bar, and that the Carrefour Express on rue Saint-Léonard was vandalized. The police told RTBF of five judicial arrests and one administrative arrest, and said there had been no further incident after 1 p.m. Rue Hors-Château, closed during the clashes, reopened at 2 p.m. after the city cleared the fire damage. Sudinfo reported schools vandalized and scooters set on fire. RTBF said the French mobilization appeared to be spreading to Belgium. Pupils were filmed chanting "Glatigny, casse-toi", aimed at the French-speaking education minister. VRT NWS reported that free-network and municipal secondary schools in Liège would stay closed on 2 October for safety. At the Athénée Paul-Brusson in Montegnée, RTBF reported a quiet blockade in support of teachers, with no clash.

A fire near Brussels-Central railway station on 9 October during student protests

By 5 October, protests spread to other major cities in Wallonia such as Mons and Charleroi, as well as the Brussels-Capital Region. In Charleroi, 21 student protesters were arrested on 5 October who set fire to dumpsters using electric scooter batteries. Blockades were put before Athénée Charles Janssens in the Brussels municipality of Ixelles.

On 6 October, The New York Times reported that protests had spread to high schools in Belgium, where police dispersed peaceful protestors. Police spokesperson Jadranka Lozina accused students of vandalism.

On 7 October, riots gripped Liège, following earlier student protests, prompting authorities to close Liège-Guillemins railway station and urging local businesses to shut down.

=== Albania ===
Starting on 13 October in Tirana, students rioted and set fires, including attacking the government building of the Ministry of Education. The situation escalated, with riot police being involved. RENEA units were deployed on the 17th. The protests were ongoing as of 25 October.

=== Italy ===
Broken shopfront in Milan, Italy after rioting on 17 October

On 16 October, Italian students in major cities like Milan, Turin, Bologna, Genoa, Verona, Rome, Bari, Florence, Venice, Padua, Treviso and Cagliari started protesting, inspired by their French counterparts. The mobilization was denominated "No Meloni Day". Demonstrators protested against the conditions of Italian educational facilities, against the measures adopted by the government to limit the number of foreign students in classrooms, and demanded that the government spend more on education and less on weapons.

Students from the Italia in Piazza movement, alongside trade unions and political organizations, staged protests in response to the rising cost of living and the sharp surge in the price of gasoline and other fuels—developments attributed to the war in Iran. The Italian government has also planned to set a percentage limit on the number of foreign students in Italian classrooms relative to Italian students and to eliminate classes consisting exclusively of foreign students, with the aim of "fostering better integration and mutual understanding".

In Milan, the police used water cannons after protesters threw stones at them in the Gothic Cathedral. In Bologna, police used a water cannon to disperse the crowd and arrested seven people. Most of the material damage occurred in Milan. In Rome, demonstrators threw firecrackers, fire extinguishers and cherry bombs in front of the Ministry of Education building, calling for Giuseppe Valditara, the Italian Minister of Education, and asking him to "get out of the building" while shouting the slogan "More classrooms, no more bombs." The Italian Education Minister said "This is not a democratic expression of dissent, nor a defence of the school, but an attack on institutions, and political hooliganism". During the second day of the protests in Milan, Turin, and Bologna, small riots split off from the protests, which had developed to encompass general social and economic discontent. Milan saw increased rioting, with many luxury storefronts reportedly looted.

On 19 October, the 17 October Movement spontaneously took shape. In the early hours of 20 October 2026, viral messages and screenshots of fake news began circulating, claiming that rioters would burn down universities. The Italian government intended to deploy 500 army troops to defend Milan on 19 October and implement new security measures for 20 October, such as extending preventive detention for minors and cracking down on "youth gangs". Additionally, shops in central Milan announced their early closure in response to the looting, while some removed merchandise from their front windows.

Meanwhile, in Southern Italy, truck drivers, farmers, and fishermen held local protests and subsequently organized blockades at ports and along major roadways, leading to the temporary emptying of supermarket shelves and a failure to resupply gasoline stations with fuel. The students' protest became part of a broader climate of social protest, with the movement seeing road haulers and other categories joining student protests and going on strike because of the high costs of diesel and the already high cost of living. In Apulia, students, road haulers and farmers demonstrated together. Minister of Infrastructure and Transport Matteo Salvini scheduled a meeting with representatives of road haulers for 20 October in Milan. Representatives of the Calabrian road haulers have said that they will not stop the strikes, blockades and demonstrations if the meeting does not result in a "satisfying outcome".

On 24 October, thousands of people took part in demonstrations in several Italian cities, including Milan, Rome, Turin, Naples, Bologna and Florence. According to Italian police, nine people were arrested and 371 were temporarily detained during protests in eight cities. Of those taken to police stations, 110 were minors.

=== Greece ===
On 13 October, Greek students began protests in the Syntagma Square of Athens, which are centered around the issues of unaffordable prices of living for students, mainly in terms of student housing. Additionally, protestors brought up complaints of the lack of funding for the public education system. Demonstrators erected tents outside of the Ministry of National Economy and Finance and the Hellenic Parliament, mainly as a blockade, but according to the Hellenic Broadcasting Corporation the tents are also a comment about the condition of housing in Greece.

The organizers said that the tents were planned to stand for the following two days, and then a protest concert would be held the following week on 20 October.

=== Canada ===
On 17 October, a protest in solidarity with the students in France was held in Montreal, focusing on rising cost of living and police misconduct.

=== Germany ===
On October 31, during the third weekend of protests in France, demonstrations were also held in Germany. German police said they had arrested more than 200 people after violent clashes in several cities on Saturday night. The clashes came after largely peaceful "Generation Z" demonstrations in more than 30 German cities, where tens of thousands of young people had gathered to call for higher education funding and relief from rising living costs, and to oppose plans to reintroduce compulsory military service.

=== Portugal ===
In Portugal, protestors in Lisbon protested against government policies which included reducing limits on rent rises and making it easier to evict people. However, Prime Minister Luís Montenegro defended these policies, saying they would help strengthen the rental market.

=== Spain ===
In Spain, hundreds of protestors gathered in Madrid’s Puerta del Sol since September to protest about rent and evictions. On 24 October thousands marched through the city to protest about potential privatization of pensions and high housing prices.

=== Other ===
Smaller protests have occurred in Austria and Ireland.

== Incidents ==
=== Paris and Seine-Saint-Denis ===
Police firing tear gas during clashes at Porte Saint-Martin in Paris, 17 October 2026

In Saint-Denis, the Lycée Paul-Éluard was closed after fires at the gates. CNN reported that fencing was torn down. Le Figaro reported soot on the bitumen, fire damage on the metal gates, and banners denouncing lack of resources and police violence. It said the Lycée Frédéric Bartholdi was also closed, that courses were cancelled, and that a handful of students from Paris 8 and Paris 13 remained after the lycée pupils had left. On 28 September, HuffPost reported clashes at the same lycée, with tear gas used against pupils, arrests, fireworks and other projectiles thrown at police. On 29 September, Paris Match reported bins set on fire in front of the gates, a call to the fire service, and two arrests at about 8:15 a.m. A CLPRESS video from the same morning showed a fence falling after pupils shook it. RMC reported that the principal of the Lycée Jean-Pierre-Timbaud in Aubervilliers was slightly burned by a firework, and that a principal in Val-de-Marne was grazed by a firework and shocked but not injured. On 17 October, a 17-year-old pupil had his right hand blown off with a crowd-control grenade in Saint-Etienne. In Pantin, BFM reported a fire lit in front of the Lycée Berthelot and fireworks fired at the pupils.

The Île-de-France regional authority said more than 200 lycées were disrupted, about 50 of them the scene of violence, and that about 30 gates or entrance locks had been damaged, at a cost it put above €1 million.

On 28 September in Saint-Ouen-l'Aumône, Val-d'Oise, a 14-year-old's lawyer, Elsa Marcel, said he had a double jaw fracture, broken upper teeth and several broken lower teeth, and that he required heavy surgery. The Defender of Rights opened an inquiry. Nuñez said the IGPN had been asked to investigate injuries to lycée students in Saint-Ouen-l'Aumône, Sevran, and Tours.

Firefighters extinguish a burning car during riots in Paris, 17 October 2026

In Paris, the prefecture of police said a young policewoman who had stopped to pick up a fallen radio was caught by several people, and kicked. The assault was filmed. She filed a complaint. The prefect said the acts were unspeakable.

Europe 1 reported that Ritchy Thibault, 23, a former parliamentary assistant to LFI deputy Ersilia Soudais, was arrested in Saint-Denis on 1 October during the blockades. On a video filmed by a participant, he told the crowd that 17 October would be "a thousand times worse than the yellow vests", and then: "We're going to build barricades. We're going to set fire to the Élysée. We're going to make the Revolution." Europe 1 said he was under judicial supervision that barred him from demonstrations, and that he was listed as a security threat.

=== Hauts-de-France ===
On 30 September in Roubaix, ICI reported that the entrance door of the private Lycée Léonard-de-Vinci caught fire after bins were set alight. A pupil who passed at about 7:30 a.m. put the crowd at least 200. Firefighters and police attended, and tear gas was used. The school cancelled classes for Wednesday and Thursday. La Voix du Nord reported gatherings that morning at Saint-Martin, Léonard-de-Vinci, and Saint-Rémi, with bin fires that damaged a door and a gate. It said about 100 teenagers then marched to Jean-Moulin, where the entrance grilles were taken down, and that police pushed back about 150 pupils at Baudelaire. At Louis-Loucheur, bins were burned, and people tried to pull the gate off. The Nord prefecture told ICI that 29 schools in the department were disrupted that day and that 25 people were arrested.

In Lille on 1 October, Ouest-France reported burning bins and projectiles thrown at riot police near the neighbouring lycées Gaston-Berger and Faidherbe, and police charges with tear gas. franceinfo reported a police intervention at Faidherbe. La Voix du Nord reported that Tuesday's mobilization included serious damage at the Lycée César-Baggio, where a teacher was assaulted. ICI reported bins burned and bus shelters smashed at Baggio on 29 September, with tear gas used against a crowd of about 200.

In Haubourdin, near Lille, France Info reported that municipal buildings were ransacked, that the Lycée Beaupré stayed closed on Thursday and Friday, and that two nearby schools were also closed. ICI reported bins burned there and wrote that the lycée and the two nearby schools would stay closed until Monday. On 28 September, La Voix du Nord reported that about 100 young people burned tires and pieces of wood outside Beaupré, and that police used tear gas.

In Tourcoing, La Voix du Nord reported that at the Lycée Sévigné, a young man was found unconscious on the ground and got up a few minutes later. After police arrived, the crowd scattered. Some people arrived with sticks and fire extinguishers, and projectiles including glass bottles and stones were thrown at police. Police used tear gas and fired rubber-bullet rounds.

In Auchel, Pas-de-Calais, the principal of the vocational lycée Fernand-Degrugillier was hit by a projectile and hospitalized, the prefecture told ICI. BFM Grand Lille, citing the sub-prefect of Béthune and the prefecture, reported that the projectile was a firework that struck him in the ear, and that the rectorat would file a complaint. RMC, citing the Béthune prosecutor, reported a lit firecracker that bounced and exploded about two metres from him. La Voix du Nord reported that an 18-year-old girl was burned on the neck by an aerosol used to feed a bin fire at the Lycée Léo-Lagrange in Bully-les-Mines, and that a 15-year-old girl in Arras was hospitalized with a scalp wound after being hit by a projectile.

=== Normandy ===
The Normandy rectorat said the principals of the Lycée Blaise-Pascal in Rouen and the Lycée Élisa-Lemonnier in Le Petit-Quevilly were assaulted and slightly injured. Tendance Ouest, citing the academy, reported that the Blaise-Pascal principal was targeted by a firework, hit in the abdomen, and burned, and that he stayed on site. Paris-Normandie reported that a fire of bins, pallets, and other objects heavily damaged the doors and entrances of Blaise-Pascal, and that the building itself did not catch fire. It said the principal was injured by a firework that morning, and that the school, already blockaded on 30 September, would stay closed until 5 October. actu.fr reported five people injured across the academy, material damage inside some blockaded lycées, 33 fire-service callouts, and more than 240 firefighters. It placed bin fires at the gates of Blaise-Pascal, not inside the building, and also at Marcel-Sembat in Sotteville-lès-Rouen and at Camille-Saint-Saëns in central Rouen. ICI separately reported a fire at Blaise-Pascal. BBC News reported a school entrance on fire in Rouen. Paris-Normandie reported that a masked group arrived at Marcel-Sembat in Sotteville-lès-Rouen at about 7:45 a.m. with two rows of shopping carts used as barricades, one at the gates and one on rue Léon-Salva. The rectorat said about 30 lycées in Seine-Maritime would stay closed on 2 October.

In Le Havre, Paris-Normandie reported a large fire of bins and branches outside the Lycée Porte-Océane, a heavy police presence, and at least one arrest. It reported several hundred pupils outside Claude-Monet, electric scooters on fire near François-Ier, and a charge toward police that the police answered. ICI reported fire damage at Porte-Océane, a street fire outside Françoise-de-Grâce, destroyed bins and at least two burned cars near Jules-Siegfried, and a fire at Saint-Vincent-de-Paul.

In Caen, Ouest-France reported barricades at the lycées Malherbe, Rostand, Fresnel, and Laplace, and a fire in the roadway in front of Malherbe.

=== Brittany ===
Blockade of Rennes 2 University during its occupation; "Vive la commune" has been graffitied

In Ille-et-Vilaine, Ouest-France reported that firefighters went to 18 schools and made 43 callouts: 36 fires on the public highway, two vehicle fires, and five rescues. At the Lycée Bréquigny in Rennes, people entered the building, broke windows, and burned the main gate on avenue Georges-Graff. Seven people were arrested. Callouts were also reported in Cesson-Sévigné, Saint-Malo, Bain-de-Bretagne, Dinard, and Vitré. Le Télégramme reported that LFI deputy Marie Mesmeur, wearing a tricolour sash, stood in front of a fire of bins and a shopping cart on allée Henri-Bergson and told people to stop feeding it and to stop throwing stones at a new Renault Trafic. The crowd then struck a white Audi with iron bars. A resident who tried to stop the damage was insulted. Mesmeur said the damage and thefts were not necessarily the work of the lycée pupils. The paper reported that 11 of 14 people placed in custody the day before were lycée pupils. A second Ouest-France account said about 30 people were at the Lycée Jean-Macé from 7 a.m., that bins and barriers blocked the entrance, and that pupils then blocked the entrance of the neighbouring law faculty. It reported heavy tear-gas use at Joliot-Curie.

In Saint-Brieuc, Ouest-France reported about 700 lycée students in the streets, from Chaptal, Sacré-Cœur, Jean-Moulin, and Freyssinet. At Sacré-Cœur, bottles were thrown at the road and a wall, and two workshop windows were broken.

=== Pays de la Loire ===
At the Lycée Nelson-Mandela, on the Île de Nantes, a fire reached the entrance hall on the morning of 1 October. franceinfo, citing police, said the blaze began on the facade and spread inside. About 50 firefighters were sent. The fire service said there were no victims. Classes were damaged. The school management told families, in an email seen by ICI, that the lycée should not reopen before the All Saints' Day holiday. Deputy principal Gaëlle Cordier told Agence France-Presse the fire was deliberate. The rectorat said the entrance burned after a gathering marked by violence toward staff. Ouest-France reported the entrance doors were destroyed and the facade blackened. BBC News reported fires at two Nantes high schools.

The glass entrance doors of the Lycée Talensac, also in Nantes, were destroyed by fire within minutes. That fire was put out. At Michelet, Ouest-France reported fires lit on the tram tracks, which stopped the tram. At La Colinière, fireworks caused a crowd movement among the pupils. Ouest-France reported that an Aléop school coach stopped at the Colinière bus stop was rushed by a group of young people, some in black, hoods, and medical masks. Projectiles broke several windows. Passengers moved to the back of the coach, and the driver drove off. The bus-stop windows were then smashed. The driver told the paper he had been afraid for his passengers. The same paper, citing Semitan, reported that five tram cars had windows broken, that passenger shelters and tram infrastructure were damaged, and that lines 2 and 4 and central bus lines were diverted. Ouest-France also reported bin fires and fireworks blocking the boulevard in front of the Lycée Carcouët.

Ouest-France reported blockades that morning at Camus, Guist'hau, La Colinière, Michelet, and Mandela in Nantes, and about 500 people with barriers at Jean-Perrin in Rezé, where fires of branches and bins were lit on the roadway. Ouest-France said the day's blockades in the department ran from Pornic to Nantes and Saint-Nazaire.

The Loire-Atlantique prefecture told franceinfo in the morning that nine schools had been damaged, that fires had been set at three, including Mandela, and that 18 people had been arrested in the department. It blamed "violent individuals" who it said had joined the lycée students. Ouest-France, citing the prefecture later in the day, reported 35 arrests. The prefect, the rector, and head teachers were due to meet that evening. Ouest-France reported that some public lycées in Nantes would be closed on Friday and that private schools in the city centre would teach remotely.

In Avrillé, near Angers, Ouest-France reported that a group forced the administrative entrance of the Lycée Paul-Émile-Victor, stole furniture, archives, and computer equipment, and set the stolen material on fire. In Angers, the same paper reported an intrusion at the Lycée Chevrollier and two teachers injured. It said one teacher was caught in a crush at the gate, slightly injured in the head, and in shock. It also reported bin fires, smashed bus shelters, and stones thrown at fire engines and police cars.

=== Centre-Val de Loire ===
France Info reported clashes between police and protesters outside the Lycée Grandmont in Tours, the largest lycée in the agglomeration. The 16-year-old student injured during the 30 September blockade later lost the use of his right eye. The Tours prosecutor said the injury was consistent with an impact from an LBD round. The IGPN opened an investigation into the circumstances of the incident. The Tours case is also one of the three IGPN inquiries into injured pupils.

=== Auvergne-Rhône-Alpes ===
Barricaded doors at the lycée Champollion in Grenoble, 30 September 2026

ICI reported that the principal of the Lycée Ambroise-Brugière in Clermont-Ferrand was slightly injured in the head by a firework, which the prefecture attributed to masked people from outside the school. The same account listed about 10 bin fires and a halt to the city's T2C transit network. RTL's account of attacks on school heads also cited fireworks being launched in Clermont.

Franceinfo published a photograph of a burning barricade near the Lycée Mounier in Grenoble. In Annecy, the Lycée Sommelier was blockaded. The gates of the Lycée Gabriel-Fauré were damaged, and about 1,800 of its pupils were told to follow lessons remotely on Friday. A second Annecy lycée was also moved to remote teaching due to degraded security. Le Dauphiné libéré reported deliberate container fires and fireworks being launced at school gates in the Annecy basin, and tear gas after clashes with police. It named blockades at Louis-Berthollet, Germain-Sommeiller, Gabriel-Fauré, Louis-Lachenal in Argonay, Tom-Morel, and Charles-Baudelaire in Cran-Gevrier. ICI reported that the gathering at Charles-Baudelaire degenerated, that fireworks were fired at police, and that police answered with tear gas. It also reported fires of street furniture at Berthollet, Sommelier, and Louis-Lachenal, and damaged gates at Gabriel-Fauré. The Haute-Savoie prefecture told ICI of 12 arrests, most of them minors, and said Sommelier, Baudelaire, Berthollet, Fauré, and Lachenal would stay closed on 2 October.

L'Essor savoyard described the gathering in front of Charles-Baudelaire as more peaceful, with about 50 pupils and placards, and placed the fireworks and the closed road on avenue du Capitaine-Anjot, near Tom-Morel. RTL, citing the prefect of the Loire, reported that principals were injured to differing degrees, at Rive-de-Gier and Saint-Étienne, and that two gendarmes and three police officers in the department were hit by stones or fireworks. In Saint-Étienne, Radio Scoop reported bins set on fire and windows broken with barriers at the Lycée Étienne-Mimard, and a crowd pushed back at Claude-Fauriel. Citing Le Progrès, it said the gymnasium of the Sainte-Marie school was ransacked. Le Progrès reported an intrusion inside Sainte-Marie and quoted the school's management as saying it had never seen that level of violence. TL7 reported fireworks at Étienne-Mimard, a security perimeter, and 20 arrests in the police zone, most of them minors. The prefecture told the station that 15 public lycées and one private school in the Loire were affected. The city of Saint-Étienne condemned bin fires, fires on the tram tracks, and torn-down road signs.

=== Provence-Alpes-Côte d'Azur ===
Demonstrators block the A8 motorway near Pont de l'Arc in Aix-en-Provence, 17 October 2026

At the Lycée Saint-Exupéry, in the 15th arrondissement of Marseille, a fire engine sent to a rubbish fire was itself set alight after the crew was forced off the vehicle. The Bouches-du-Rhône prefecture told BFM that hundreds of young people surrounded the marine-firefighters' engine, forced the crew to leave it, and set it on fire. The battalion said a first-intervention vehicle was also burned and that one marine firefighter was slightly injured. BFM also reported that equipment inside the engine was taken.

At the Lycée Victor-Hugo, accounts differed. The Provence-Alpes-Côte d'Azur regional council told RTL that a fire was attempted inside the building and that the principal, deputy principal, general secretary, and team leader were assaulted and doused with petrol. RTL reported that the principal and deputy were splashed unintentionally while youths tried to set a bin alight, and that one member of the management was thrown to the ground without a visible injury. A witness told RTL she had been sent video of the deputy principal being hit at 7 a.m. Reuters reported local authorities as saying teachers were splashed inadvertently. The rectorat later told Agence France-Presse that the deputy principal and two other staff were splashed by people putting petrol into containers. BFM reported that the rectorat had walked back the region's wording, from staff "doused" with petrol to staff "splashed" by petrol a group was putting into containers.

The Marseille transit authority, RTM, stopped the entire network after buses were attacked near lycées in the north and east of the city. Marsactu, citing RTM, reported that a bus was set on fire beside the Lycée La Floride, in the 14th arrondissement, that drivers had to leave their vehicles in a hurry, and that one driver was assaulted. RTM said it would file a complaint. Actu.fr reported that pupils took control of a bus at La Floride and then set it on fire. Reuters reported assaults on drivers with injuries. The Bouches-du-Rhône police prefecture said 40 lycées were affected, 18 of them fully blocked, with more than 4,600 participants. RTL reported that M6 said a Marseille correspondent was injured in the forehead and his camera broken while covering a lycée protest, and that the group was filing a complaint. Ouest-France, citing M6's journalists' society, placed the assault at the Lycée Saint-Exupéry: the correspondent was surrounded as he was leaving, struck several times, and his camera was destroyed.

In Manosque, Le Dauphiné libéré reported eight arrests, one person injured, and the start of a fire at the town hall. About 950 of the department's 5,000 lycée pupils were mobilized. Prefect Isabelle Tomatis said the right to protest was not a right to assault, smash, or burn.

In Avignon, the same paper reported that students from the Aubanel, René-Char, and Philippe-de-Girard lycées barricaded themselves behind bins and that some threw Molotov cocktails when CRS tried to push them back. It put the arrests at about 20. ICI, citing the Vaucluse prefecture, reported fires on the public highway, destroyed street furniture, three police officers and one gendarme injured, and three fire engines hit by projectiles. At Philippe-de-Girard, it reported two fire engines hit, a destroyed bus shelter, and eggs thrown at the town hall. La Provence reported that police and firefighters putting out bin fires at Philippe-de-Girard and Aubanel were targeted with projectiles.

=== Occitanie ===
Midi Libre reported a fire at the Lycée Mendès-France in Montpellier, with firefighters sent to contain it, and further damage around that school. In Nîmes, the same paper's live blog reported that the Lycée Saint-Vincent-de-Paul had a tagged facade and broken windows. It said people from outside the school put up barricades and set them on fire at about 7:15 a.m., that staff first confined the pupils, and that the school was then evacuated. The Gard prefecture, reported by TV Sud, counted 580 people at 16 schools in Nîmes, Alès, and Rodilhan, with bin fires, gates and street furniture torn down, vandalized portals, and intrusions. It reported 22 arrests and 13 people slightly injured, including six police officers and two education staff.

=== Nouvelle-Aquitaine ===
Fire at the town hall in Limoges, 17 October 2026

In La Rochelle, Sud Ouest reported that a Yélo bus was attacked in the morning near the Lycée Rompsay. About 20 young passengers were on board. Two were slightly injured. Eleven others, and the driver, were treated for shock. Several bus shelters were vandalized at place de Verdun, where the marches met. The network was suspended and was due to resume in the middle of the afternoon. The agglomeration said the afternoon school run would still run.

=== South-west, Grand Est, and other cities ===
Reuters reported that riot police clashed with youths in Toulouse and that at least one car was burned in Strasbourg. In Tournefeuille, west of Toulouse, La Dépêche du Midi reported fires and projectiles at the Lycée Françoise from about 9:30 a.m., smashed windows at the entrance, and staff moved to the back of the building. A resident told the paper there was smoke everywhere and that police were firing smoke grenades. At the Lycée Stéphane-Hessel, in the Roseraie district, La Dépêche reported that bins were set alight and then the lodge was burned. Teachers and pupils told the paper that many people from outside the school had joined the blockade. The same paper reported a large fire that reached the lodge of the Lycée Roland-Garros. Toulouse FM reported bins, a bicycle, and a Tisséo bus shelter set on fire or smashed on route d'Espagne during the blockade of the Lycée Gallieni, and a CRS charge to clear the entrance for firefighters. It listed further clashes at Déodat-de-Séverac, Les Arènes, Bellevue, Ozenne, Saint-Sernin, Henri-de-Toulouse-Lautrec, Urbain-Vitry, and Rive-Gauche. ICI, citing the authorities, reported 57 arrests in Haute-Garonne, 13 pupils slightly injured, including several attacked while trying to put out a fire, damaged gates, lodges partly destroyed at two lycées, about 30 vandalized bus shelters, and fires of bins and tyres. Hessel and Françoise were among 18 schools closed the next day.

On 29 September, Toulouse FM reported that a member of the management at Stéphane-Hessel was charged, knocked down, and beaten by a crowd of minors while trying to put out a bin fire. In Strasbourg, authorities halted trams. Al Jazeera reported that barriers were burned on the tracks. franceinfo's photograph caption showed a street blocked at the Lycée Camille-Jullian in Bordeaux. franceinfo also reported fireworks being launched in Bordeaux, then a fire on a lycée facade. The same report said a pupil was burned in front of classmates at another Nantes lycée. RMC reported that a deputy principal in Nîmes was slightly injured.

=== Attacks not tied to a named school ===
CNN reported that videos showed two teachers being attacked, and that the presidency, officials, and teaching unions condemned the footage. It did not name the schools. It also reported a government figure of one pupil who partly lost the use of a hand after setting off a firework which happened again on 17 October in Saint-Étienne. Al Jazeera, citing regional education authorities, prefectures, and unions, reported that several principals were injured, harassed, or assaulted during Thursday's blockades. RMC reported that at least 10 head teachers and deputy heads had been injured since the protests began.

== Casualties, arrests and damage ==
On 1 October, the Interior Ministry's arrest figure was 1,949. Le Figaro reported 1,793 people placed in custody, 90 percent of them minors. It said about one third of the cases concerned attacks on public officers, one third unlawful assembly, and one third property damage. Bobigny prosecutor Alexandre de Bosschère described the local pattern as a pre-riot, citing group possession of incendiary products or weapons, damage, and violence. ICI attributed the 1,793 custody figure to the Justice Ministry and said it covered the period since Monday. An arrest is not the same thing as being placed in custody.

Officer injuries were reported differently on the same day. The franceinfo live blog, citing the Interior Ministry, reported 84 police and gendarmes injured. Later, ICI and the BBC, also citing the Interior Ministry, reported 305. On Wednesday, Nuñez had said 83 officers were injured.

As of 6 October, the Justice Ministry reported that 5,060 people had been arrested since the protests began, with 87% of them being minors. The ministry also stated that more than 1,800 people were being prosecuted, including 1,483 minors, and that 790 cases had been dismissed. Lecornu's office also reported that at least 715 police officers and 215 teenagers had been injured in the clashes.

Geffray said on Thursday evening that 235 people had been hurt on the side of the protesters since Monday: 170 pupils and 65 staff. Earlier on Wednesday, he had given a cumulative figure of 119. CNN reported a government figure of 159 students and staff injured over several days.

According to the BBC, during the riots on 17 October, 1,500 shops and businesses were destroyed or ransacked, and a further 3,000 were looted.

== Criticism of policing tactics ==
High school students take part in a demonstration in Perpignan, 2 October 2026

=== Police violence ===
The policing of the movement drew criticism from a multitude of observers. Sociologist Robi Morder, a specialist in youth movements, described the scale of the repression as unprecedented for a high-school movement. Interior Minister Laurent Nuñez said officers had been instructed to use all available intermediate weapons to put an end to the unrest. Amnesty International, the Human Rights League, the Syndicat de la magistrature and the National Consultative Commission on Human Rights each condemned what they described as a disproportionate use of force against minors.

As early as 27 September, lawyers from the Paris and Seine-Saint-Denis bars alleged that pupils arrested at blockades had been beaten, including a 15-year-old reportedly slapped repeatedly inside a police station in Saint-Denis. Several serious injuries followed. In Saint-Ouen-l'Aumône, a 14-year-old was struck with a baton and shot in the jaw with a tear gas round by police at close range, causing a broken jaw and the loss of several teeth. According to the Pontoise prosecutor, he had struck a police officer beforehand. In Tours, a 16-year-old lost the use of his right eye on 30 September; the prosecutor said his injuries were consistent with a Flash-Ball projectile. On 5 October, a 15-year-old in Lens lost his left hand when a grenade exploded near his school; Interior Minister Laurent Nuñez subsequently ordered a temporary suspension of the use of stun grenades in the context of the lycée protests pending investigation. In Metz, prosecutors opened an inquiry into possible sexual assault after a video appeared to show an officer touching a 14-year-old girl he was restraining. By 5 October, at least ten investigations had been referred to the IGPN, France's police oversight body. A 17-year-old in Mulhouse later lost an eye during demonstrations.

By mid-October, the Inspectorate General of the National Police (IGPN) had opened at least 24 to 36 internal investigations into alleged police misconduct related to the protests, according to varying official figures reported by the Interior Ministry and prosecutors. Human Rights Watch documented serious injuries to children and described the police response as involving excessive force, while Amnesty International criticized the "reckless" use of tear-gas grenades and rubber bullets against predominantly minor protesters. On 28 October, the United Nations Human Rights Council expressed concern over reports of unnecessary and disproportionate force, including against children.

La France Insoumise leader Jean-Luc Mélenchon, who participated in the 24 October protest, criticized what he called "indiscriminate attacks" on the protesters in Paris.

==== Tear gas ====
Tear gas fired by police in Lille, 17 October 2026

Despite being described as a "less-lethal" weapon, numerous concerns regarding tear gas arose over its use during the protests. Protesters criticized police for firing tear gas unprovoked, including at peaceful protesters and bystanders, while others criticized its use near schools and in confined spaces, such as narrow streets and the Paris Metro. On 2 November, Laurent Nuñez claimed that he had "no knowledge of the harmful nature" and refused to suspend its use "as a matter of precaution".

Lacrymos de Sang, a collective of activists and health workers, took the testimonies of nearly 10,000 women between 8 October and 31 October. They released their findings at a conference at the National Assembly on 17 November. Their findings reported 9 out of 10 women experiencing severe gynecological disorders, including menstrual irregularities, intense bleeding, pain and cramps after being exposed to tear gas. Some attributed miscarriages as being caused by tear gas, with 15 out of 47 pregnant women who had been exposed (approximately 32 percent), reporting to have lost their pregnancies, a proportion twice as high than usual. Opposition lawmakers asked the government to suspend use of tear gas pending more research into its effects.

== Responses ==
=== Public opinion ===
On 1 October, a poll conducted by Odoxa for the think tank Backbone and the paper Le Figaro indicated that 62% of French people believed that the students' movement was justified. The same poll found that 61% believed that LFI was too involved, 74% felt that the party was putting students in danger, and 78% felt that the party was exploiting the movement for political gain. On October 7, a poll from the Council on Foreign Relations found 55% of French people were in favor of the protest movement 10 days before the protests descended into violence. On 27 October, an Odoxa-Mascaret poll found 74% of French adults expect National Rally leader and presidential candidate Marine Le Pen to gain from the unrest. Le Pen's approval rating has risen three points since the unrest.

=== Government ===
On 16 September, Prime Minister Sebastien Lecornu said that the government would increase its petrol subsidies for affected industries to the maximum authorized level allowed under EU rules until 31 December. The subsidies did not quell the protests, which resumed on 17 September. On 7 October, Lecornu addressed the fuel protesters again and announced a release of 10 million barrels from France's strategic diesel reserves to bring down fuel prices.

French president Emmanuel Macron announced an emergency G7 meeting. On 2 October, the G7 agreed to release 100 million reserve barrels of oil and diesel fuel over the next 4 months.

Prime Minister Sébastien Lecornu said the difficulties of the lycées "must be heard" and that violence had to be condemned. After the 1 October crisis meeting, his office called the unrest urban violence and cited the intelligence assessment naming LFI. Le Figaro reported that it had seen a note from the Paris police prefecture whose authors wrote that the origins of the movement "plainly reside in an instrumentalization of student-union structures and of political movements close to the far left".

Addressing the violence, Lecornu said on 28 September that "Fireworks, fires, violence near high schools: nothing justifies endangering students, staff, or police officers."

Lecornu told the paper that about 20 national LFI office-holders were involved on 29 September, from Lille to Rennes and Toulouse. Geffray said the lycée movement had been "taken hostage by ultra-violent groups", told parents not to let their children join, and said no demand could justify the acts. Justice Minister Gérald Darmanin called the 36 prosecutors general to a video meeting and asked for a firm penal response. Interior Minister Laurent Nuñez said police had opened internal inquiries into allegations of brutality against three students.

On 5 October, the Interior Ministry said that the Inspectorate General of the National Police (IGPN) had opened ten investigations since the start of the protests into police interventions during the mobilization.

On 6 October, Prime Minister Lecornu instructed ministers to address the students' main demands and present initial proposals by the end of October. These included ensuring that absent teachers were replaced, reviewing the length of the school day, and carrying out necessary repairs to older school buildings.

26 October, the government offered its first concessions. These included capped classroom sizes, 15,000 new education spaces, €4 billion for school renovations, and replacing Parcoursup, an unpopular university learning platform. Organizers celebrated what they alleged was fear in the government, but insisted the concessions did not go far enough.

=== Political parties ===
Place Publique presidential candidate Raphaël Glucksmann criticised Macron's government for its "lack of preparedness" over the cost-of-living crisis.

Bruno Retailleau, a Republican presidential candidate, told BFM-RMC that LFI was "fascinated by violence", was calling for sedition, and was trying to organize an insurrection. He said the lycée clashes were a "dress rehearsal" for 2027 if Marine Le Pen won, and raised the question of banning LFI.

Member of Parliament Louis Boyard, of LFI, at the October 17 demonstration in Paris.

LFI founder, Jean-Luc Mélenchon, had already called the pupils harmless and the police response racist in tone.

Gabriel Attal, a Renaissance presidential candidate, told Agence France-Presse that LFI's use of the movement was unbearable and asked Mélenchon and LFI deputies to stop using young people as "political cannon fodder". BFM reported that Attal had first repeated the regional council's claim that a Marseille management team had been doused with petrol, and that the rectorat then described them as splashed.

National Rally leader Marine Le Pen described the unrest as a "deep crisis" and accused President Emmanuel Macron's government of having lost its authority. She also criticized the far left over the violence. Reconquête leader Éric Zemmour blamed the violence on what he described as hatred of France and a desire for revenge over colonialism. He called for tougher penalties for those involved and argued that a return to social peace would require "remigration".

Manuel Bompard, coordinator of the left-wing party La France Insoumise, rejected Matignon's account of the origin of the movement. Valérie Pécresse, president of Île-de-France, gave the damage estimate above €1 million. Le Figaro reported that Pécresse said she would send a €100,000 bill to the mayor of Saint-Denis, Bally Bagayoko, for the Paul-Éluard gate, guarding, and cleaning, and that she accused him of having encouraged the people who damaged it. Europe 1 quoted the region's vice-president, James Chéron, saying those responsible and their legal guardians would be pursued, and that the region counted more than 20 burned gates and about 10 ransacked schools.

=== International ===
US President Donald Trump and multiple Republican leaders blamed Muslim immigrants for the riots. Trump said the violence was caused by "the immigration of people from an entirely different world, people with hatred in their hearts". He urged Macron to close France's borders, further claiming he has been asking him to do so for a decade. Vice President JD Vance also blamed immigrants for the riots.

Israeli Prime Minister Benjamin Netanyahu said that France had succumbed to an "invasion of extremist Islam" and urged French leaders to "fight against the extremists".

Hungary's Péter Magyar and Poland's Donald Tusk said the riots in France justified strict migration policies.

The European Commission condemned the arson, looting, and attacks on individuals and public and historic buildings in France. Commission spokesperson Markus Lammert stated that authorities must distinguish peaceful demonstrators from those committing violence.

Swedish environmental and social activist Greta Thunberg visited student protesters outside Lycée Paul-Éluard in Saint-Denis on 13 October, saying that their movement was inspiring young people in other countries.

Italian Deputy Prime Minister Matteo Salvini wrote on X that the "axis of evil" formed by left-wing extremists and Islamist fanatics was the main danger facing Europe. His post included footage of the town hall in Limoges on fire. Spanish Vox leader Santiago Abascal warned of what he called "Islamo-leftism" in a post on X, describing the unrest in France as a threat to European civilization.

The United Nations High Commissionner for Human Rights, Volker Türk, expressed concern over human rights in relation to protests in Albania, Belgium, France, Italy and Portugal, including "reports of unnecessary and excessive use of force against protesters, including children", and urged "States to engage protesters, particularly young people, in meaningful, inclusive and constructive dialogue, and to take concrete steps to address legitimate and fundamental human rights concerns over education, public services, housing, the rising cost of living and inequality".

=== Organizations ===
The Pittsburgh Steelers cancelled a fan event that was set to take place before their 25 October game against the New Orleans Saints at Stade de France.

== See also ==
- French Revolution
- Bismillah, c'est les ténèbres
- 2026 French student protest disinformation
- Fuel protests in 2026
