= 2026 France unrest =

2026 France unrest may refer to:

- 2026 French fuel protests
- 2026 French civil unrest
- 17 October riots
