= Édouard Geffray =

French civil servant and politician (born 1978)

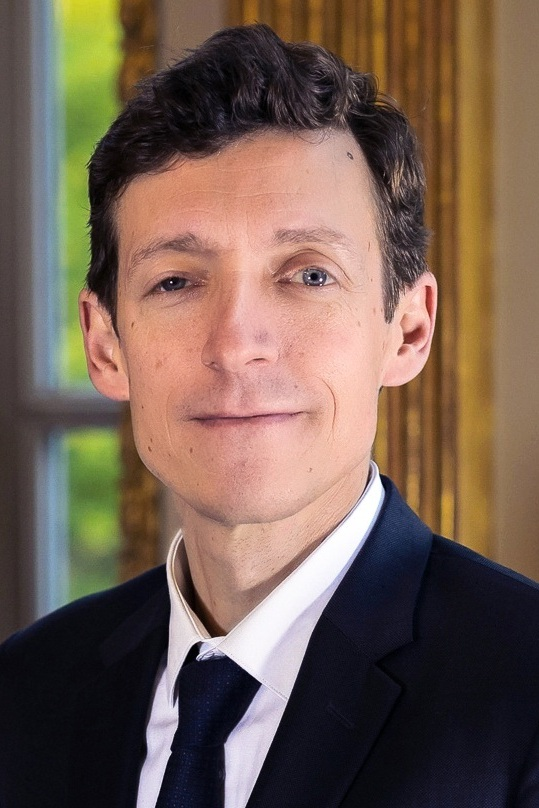
- Official portrait, 2025

Minister of National Education
- Incumbent
- Assumed office 12 October 2025
- Prime Minister: Sébastien Lecornu
- Preceded by: Élisabeth Borne

Personal details
- Born: Édouard Jean Gabriel Geffray; 2 October 1978 (age 48) Épinay-sur-Seine, France
- Party: Independent
- Education: Paris-Sorbonne University; Sciences Po; École nationale d'administration
- Occupation: Civil servant

Édouard Jean Gabriel Geffray (French pronunciation: [edwaʁ ʒefʁɛ]; born 2 October 1978) is a French senior civil servant and politician who has served as Minister of National Education in the second government of Prime Minister Sébastien Lecornu since 2025. From 2019 to 2024, he served as director general of school education.

== Career ==
In 2017, Geffray was appointed chief of staff to the Minister of Justice, François Bayrou. He was subsequently appointed Director-General of Human Resources at the Ministry of National Education and then, from 2019 onward, Director-General for School Education (DGESCO). In this position, he worked, under the authority of the Minister of National Education Jean-Michel Blanquer, on the implementation of a reform of French high-school degrees and the management of the COVID-19 pandemic in schools and, under that of Gabriel Attal, on the introduction of "needs-based groups" in lower secondary schools.

In 2021, Geffray was a candidate for the directorship of the Paris Institute of Political Studies (Sciences Po); the post eventually went to Mathias Vicherat. Having left the position of DGESCO in July 2024, Geffray returned to the Council of State in September 2024. In this capacity, he submitted to the government a report on film education in schools in September 2025.

== Minister of National Education ==
In October 2025, he was appointed Minister of National Education in the second government of Prime Minister Sébastien Lecornu. In office, he has faced the 2026 French student protests.

== Honours ==
- Knight of the Legion of Honour (2023)
- Knight of the Ordre national du Mérite (2016)
- Commander of the Ordre des Palmes académiques (2019)
