= Ministry of National Education (France) =

Government ministry of France

Minister of National Education
- Ministre de l'Éducation nationale

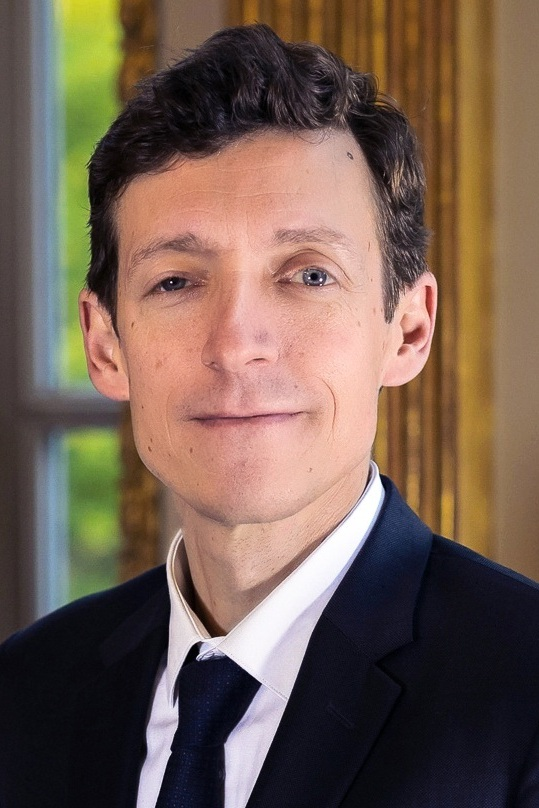
- Incumbent; Édouard Geffray since 12 October 2025
- Ministry of National Education
- Member of: Cabinet
- Reports to: President of the Republic; Prime Minister
- Seat: Hôtel de Rochechouart, 110 rue de Grenelle, Paris 7e.
- Nominator: Prime Minister
- Appointer: President of the Republic
- Term length: No fixed term
- Formation: 1 February 1828
- Website: www.education.gouv.fr

The Ministry of National Education (the title has changed several times in the course of the Fifth Republic) is the cabinet member in the Government of France who oversees the country's public educational system and supervises agreements and authorisations for private teaching organisations.

The ministry's headquarters is located in the 18th century Hôtel de Rochechouart on the Rue de Grenelle in the 7th arrondissement of Paris. As education is France's largest employment domain, the ministry directs the work of more than half of the state civil servants. The position is thereore traditionally a strategic one.

After the 2024 French legislative election, Anne Genetet was appointed Minister of National Education on 21 September 2024. She was succeeded by Élisabeth Borne from December 2024 to October 2025 in the Bayrou government and the first Lecornu government. On 12 October 2025, Édouard Geffray, former Director-General of the ministry, took the office in the second Lecornu government.

== History ==
A governmental position overseeing public education was first created in France in 1802. Following the various regime changes in France in the first decades of the 19th century, the position changed official status and name a number of times before the position of Minister of Public Instruction was created in 1828. For much of its history, the position was combined with that of Minister of Public Worship, who dealt with issues related to the Roman Catholic Church, except in instances where the Minister of Public Instruction was a Protestant. The position has also occasionally been combined with Minister of Sports and Minister of Youth Affairs. In 1932, the office's title was changed to Minister of National Education, although it was briefly changed back in 1940–1941, and was renamed Minister of Education during the presidency of Valéry Giscard d'Estaing (1974–1981). In 1975, it created the Comité d'études sur les formations d'ingénieurs which studies the training and job placement of engineers in France.

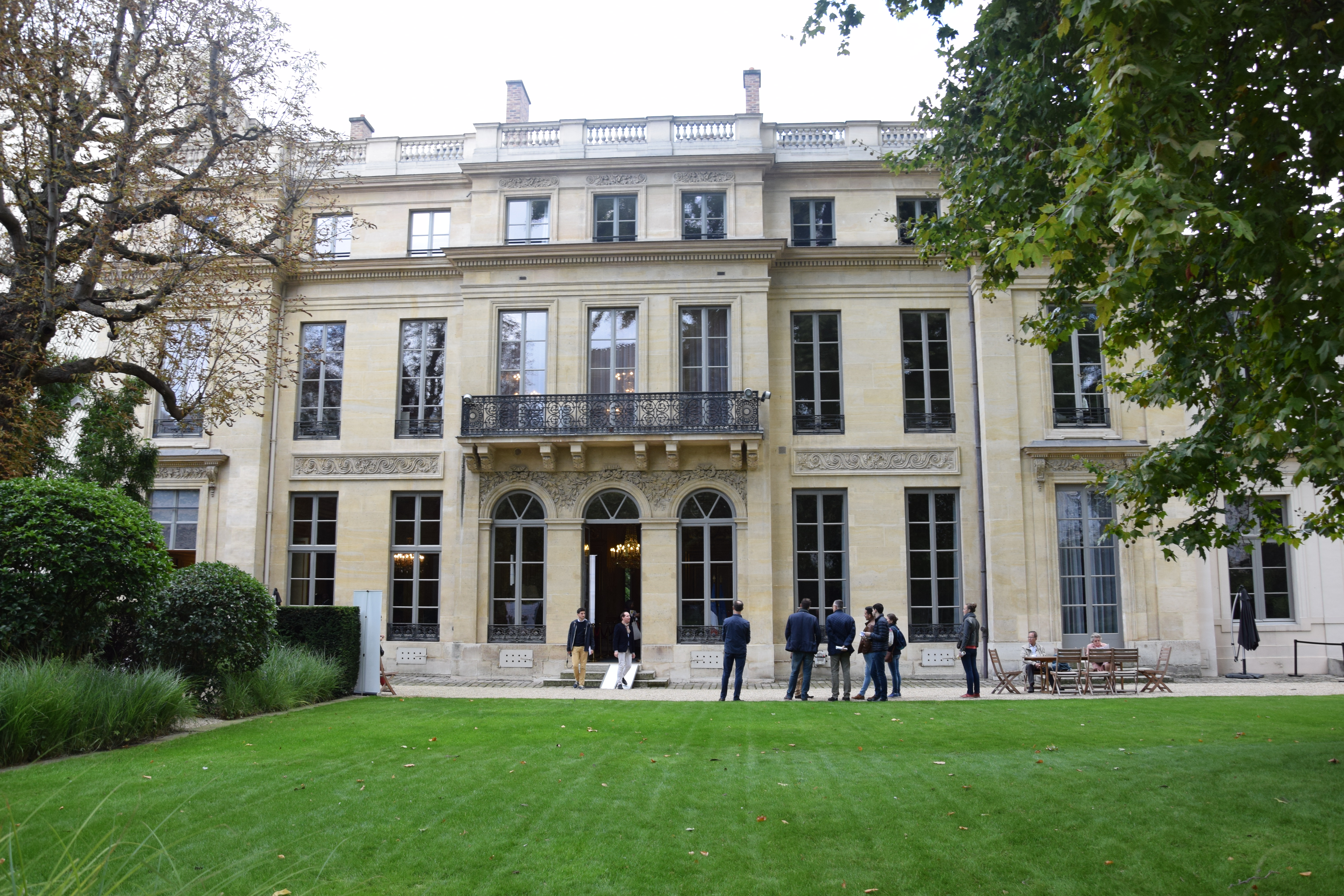
Gardens of the Hôtel de Rochechouart

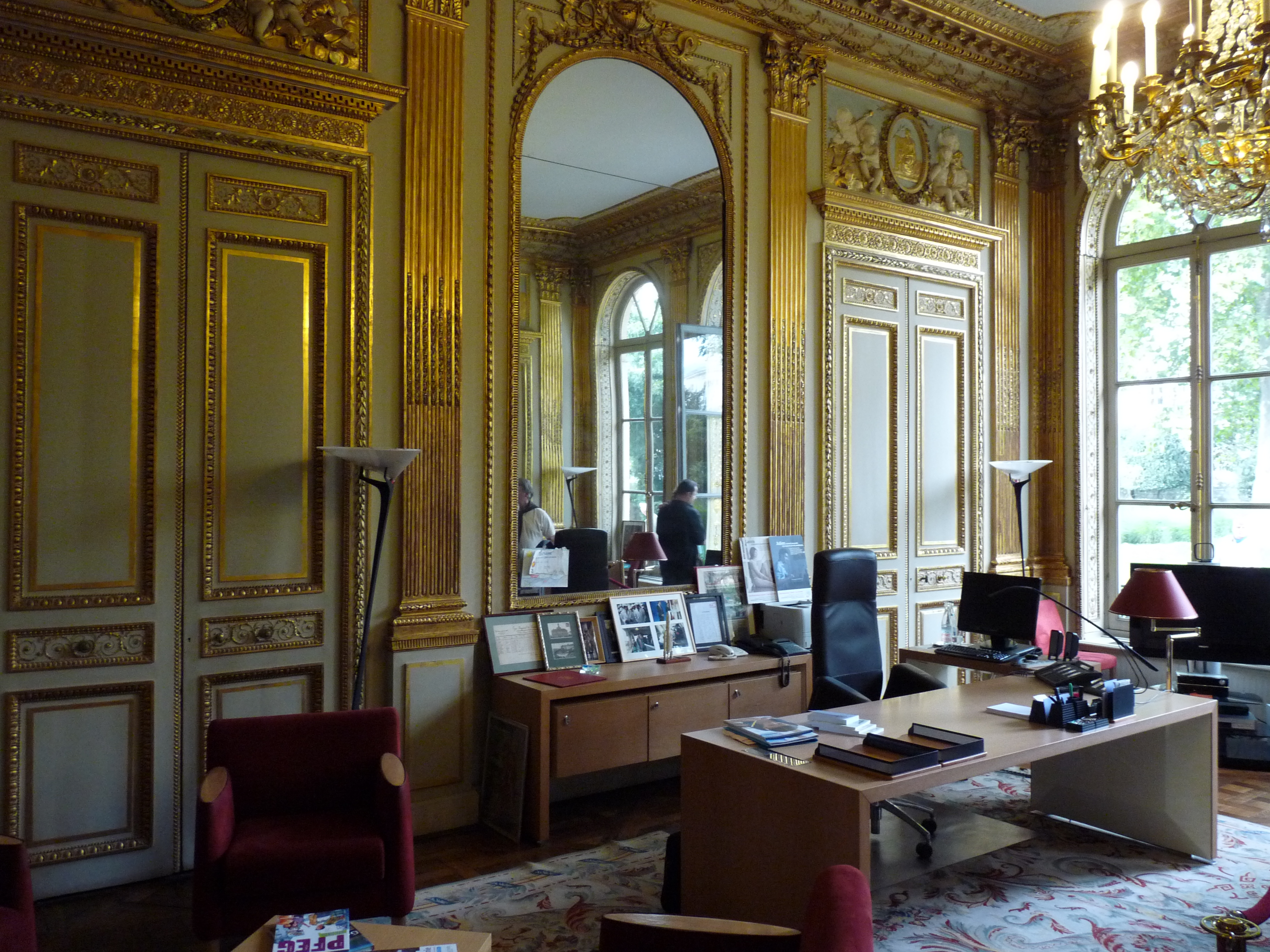
Office of the Education Minister at the Hôtel de Rochechouart

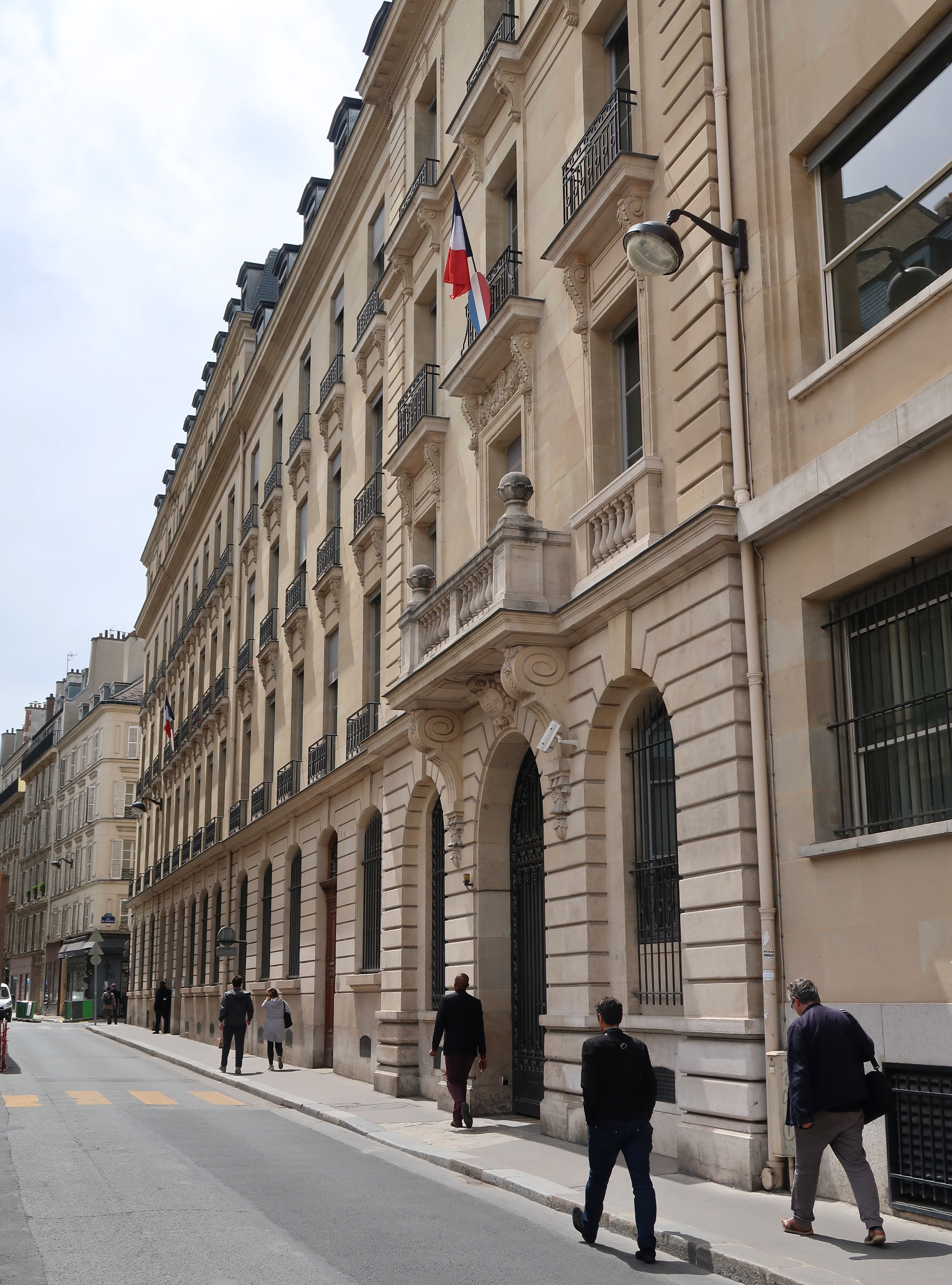
View from the street

== See also ==
- List of education ministers of France
- Education in France
- Minister of Higher Education, Research and Innovation (France)
