= Lycée Nelson Mandela (Nantes) =

School in Nantes, France

Coordinates: 47.2084°N 1.5328°W

Nelson Mandela High School
- Lycée Nelson Mandela
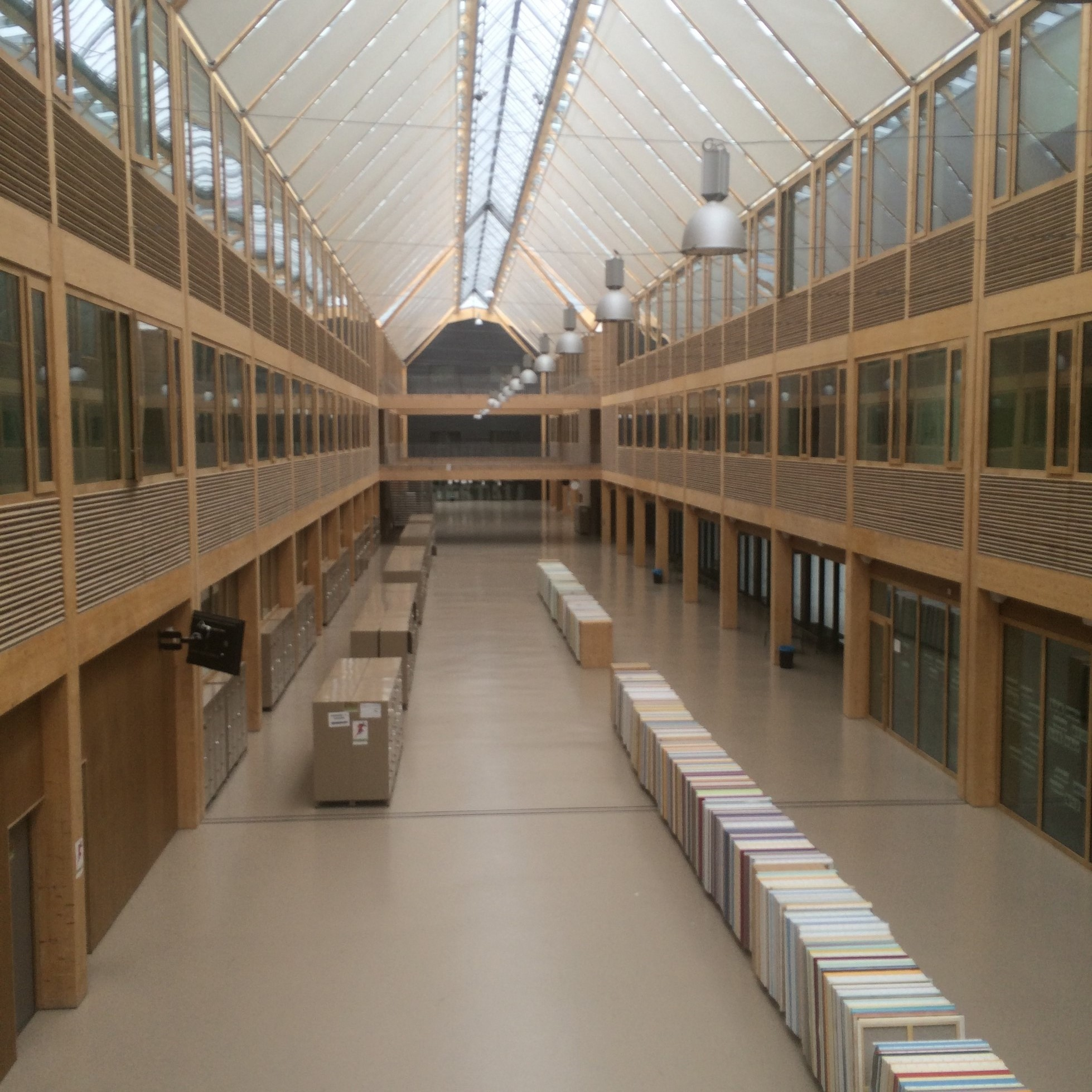
- Main hallway
- Nantes, France, Pays de la Loire

Information
- Established: September 1, 2014
- Teaching staff: 140-160
- Enrollment: 1,600
- Student to teacher ratio: 1:10
- Website: nelson-mandela.paysdelaloire.e-lyco.fr

Lycée Nelson Mandela is a senior high school in Nantes, France.

== History ==
It opened on 1 September 2014 with its official inauguration held four days later. As of 2016 the school has 140-160 teachers, 40-50 technical personnel, and 1,600 students.

The high school was named after Nelson Mandela on December 15, 2014, following an agreement between the Mairie de Nantes and the Embassy of South Africa in France.

=== Fire ===
The building was set ablaze on October 1, 2026 by rioters during student protests across the country, causing the entrance hall to burn to the ground. The incident received media coverage amid reports of far-left political involvement and Palestinian activism within the wider protest movement. Olivier Chateau, deputy to the mayor, stated that the fire had been contained to the building and that no injuries were reported.
