= Comité d'études sur les formations d'ingénieurs =

French institution

The Comité d'études sur les formations d'ingénieurs (CEFI, in English engineer training studies committee) is the French institution which studies the questions of training and job placement for engineers in France, in partnership with associations like the CNISF (National Council of Engineers and Scientists of France). Created in 1975 by French Ministry of National Education, it became an association representing engineers associations, grandes écoles and companies.

The CEFI has a website with information concerning educational system in France and job placement for graduates.

Sometimes, it performs studies for schools or partners companies.
