= Bismillah c'est les ténèbres =

2026 French protest slogan originating from alleged police infiltration

A protest board at the Place de la Bastille showing a Snapchat message containing Bismillah c'est les ténèbres

"Bismillah c'est les ténèbres" ("In the name of God, it is the darkness") is a French protest slogan that emerged during the 2026 French student protests. It originated from a Snapchat message attributed to an alleged police infiltrator, suspected of posing as a student in order to garner information about school blockades. The slogan has become one of the most recognizable expressions of the protest movement, along with other slogans criticizing government education policy and police repression.

The phrase combines the Arabic expression bismillah ("in the name of God") with the French c'est les ténèbres ("it's darkness"), described as "nonsensical" by some observers. The supposed infiltrator's language was widely criticized among activists, who described it as a racist caricature of the speech patterns of French-speaking youth of North African heritage.

== Origin ==
During the 2026 student protests, high school students in France have used Snapchat and other messaging platforms to coordinate school blockades and demonstrations. In early October 2026, students began sharing screenshots of messages from accounts suspected of belonging to police officers attempting to infiltrate these groups. The particular string of messages, attributed to an individual using the name "Mamadou", read:

Salut ! [Hey!]
Bismillah c’est les ténèbres
C’est quand le blocus wallah mon frangin [When's the blockade for real bro]
On vas [sic] tout casser [We're gonna wreck everything]
Met moi dans le groupe blocus Aichek 🇩🇿 🇩🇿 !" [Add me to the blockade group Thanks 🇩🇿 🇩🇿!]

The message was widely perceived as an attempt to feign the speech patterns of French youth from immigrant backgrounds, made evident by the mixing emojis representing the flag of Algeria with the Tunisian Arabic word Aichek. Students and online commentators noted the artificiality of the user's language, inconsistent with how young people actually spoke online, leading to suspicion that the account was operated by a police infiltrator. A screenshot of Snapchat geolocation indicates that the account is based at the Aix-en-Provence police station. However, the identity of the account holder has not been officially confirmed; French media has stressed that the screenshots have not been independently authenticated.

== Viral spread and use in protests ==
The phrase quickly became a meme on French social media, with students mocking the alleged infiltrator's awkward attempts to blend in. The screenshots spread to TikTok, Instagram and X, where users created humorous videos and parodies of the message.

Within days, the slogan appeared on hand-made placards at school blockades and student demonstrations across France, including in Paris, Rennes and Grenoble, and on social media posts to signal awareness of police surveillance tactics. Students used the phrase as a symbol of collective resistance, using it both as an ironic greeting, protest slogan, and rallying cry. In one instance, a young protester shouted the phrase at a police officer, reportedly making them laugh. On 13 October 2026, Swedish activist Greta Thunberg used it during a visit to striking students in Seine-Saint-Denis, north of Paris.

The use of the slogan is not limited to France. On 9 October, it appeared as a symbol of solidarity with French students, rather than as claims of police infiltrations, on placards at a union-led demonstration in Brussels against the Belgian government’s budget cuts. It was chant in Bologna on 15 October 2026 and in Milan on 17 and 18 October 2026 during the student protests, and in Berlin by students from a French school.

== Racist and political significance ==
The phrase’s perceived racist character is thought to have played a central role in its virality. The caricature inadvertently exposed what students saw as racist assumptions among police as to who was participating in the protest movement. The slogan thus transformed into a means by which students could mock not only the infiltration attempt itself, but the racial profiling they associated with it.

The phrase has also been adopted by activists as a warning against police infiltration more broadly. The New Anticapitalist Party used the slogan in a post on social media, reading:

Bismillah c'est les ténèbres / Ne parlez pas à la police ! (et exigez un avocat !) [Bismillah c'est les ténèbres. Don't talk to the police! (and demand a lawyer!)]

On October 9, 2026, the Instagram and Tiktok accounts of L'Humanité published a satire video in which one of their journalists depicted an undercover police officer using the expression, among others. In response, former police officer and far right RN MEP Matthieu Valet, not realizing the satirical nature of the publication, accused the newspaper of being "far left [which] therefore peddles fake news, as LFI does so well". After being extensively mocked for his mistake, he deleted his post from his socials.

== See also ==
- Racial profiling
- Racism in France
- French North Africa
- Maghrebis in France
- Shibboleth
- Toronto slang - a dialect of Canadian English creolized with Arabic

== Sources ==
- Irwin, Zane (20 October 2026). "Student Protesters in France Have a Strange New Slogan. What Does It Mean?". The New York Times.
