= 2026 French civil unrest disinformation =

Misleading content about the 2026 French high school protests

Disinformation during the 2026 French civil unrest has included the sharing of decontextualized images and false content about the protests over the internet and social media. In particular, multiple media organizations have documented the circulation of older videos and viral posts attempting to link student protests to past events and violence unrelated to the protests. Politicians have also made false or misleading statements about the protests.

== Background ==
The student protest movement began between 18-21 September at the lycée Saint-Exupéry high school in Créteil, in Val-de-Marne, a suburb of Paris. The movement then spread throughout France and Europe. Student complaints included large classes, poor school infrastructure, and a lack of needed teachers, and have linked to broader demands for social investment, employment, and lower inflation and fuel costs.

Platforms like TikTok, Snapchat and Instagram helped circulate appeals to mobilize and protest, and have shared political statements and videos. According to Le Monde, some of the shared images were created by artificial intelligence and then adapted by students at various schools. Analyses including by Viginum indicated that sharing and amplification was organic to the student movement and not influenced by outside or foreign influence.

== Spread of out-of-context videos ==
On 5 October 2026, TF1 Info published a fact check of content being shared of the protests, and found that many old videos predating the student protests were being shared as if they were related. In particular, videos of burning and overturned cars, and police joining the protestors, falsely claimed to depict September and October 2026 student protests in France.

On 8 October, Agence France-Presse published another fact check, and used reverse image and video searches to similarly find out-of-context videos were being shared falsely implicating the protests. Some content derived from 2023.

These investigations did not imply that all content shared about the 2026 student protests was false or misleading. For content that was misleading, images and videos were often real, but related to events long predating the protests.

== Role of social media ==
During the protests, social media helped organize demonstrators, share first-hand accounts, and relay information of variable reliability. On 28 September, Le Monde reported that videos and documents about student walkouts and pickets spread very fast, often encouraged by social media accounts specializing in sensational news.

On 6 October 2026, Le Monde also reported the spread of links and content on TikTok and Discord disrupting online classes, with dubious relationships to actual political demands by online students.

TF1 Info published a report noting that protestor videos were valuable sources of information but were sometimes shared or received outside contexts where they could be easily interpreted.

The BBC traced one video of an elderly couple being robbed and left in their underwear - ostensibly during riots in Paris - to an obscure website that made the video using AI. The video was viewed millions of times.

== Responsibility for violence ==
In the National Assembly, the government and centrist, right-wing, and far-right parties blamed the far-left La France Insoumise (LFI) party for allegedly fuelling the violence. LFI put the blame on interior minister Laurent Nuñez and cited a Mediapart article alleging that police intelligence were ordered to blame LFI. A parliamentary inquiry was launched into the violence and the actions of law enforcement.

Emmanuel Macron blamed foreign leaders for stoking misinformation in France. The French foreign ministry accused Iran of a "disinformation campaign" regarding the protests, after the Iranian government criticized French police violence against protestors. EU regulators warned that Russian influencers might amplify misleading protest narratives.

United States president Donald Trump blamed unrest in France on immigrants, an accusation Macron rejected.

== Media coverage and fact checking ==
Different political actors have attempted to understand or explain the source of protests in a variety of ways. On 2 October 2026, Le Monde reported on internal memos from Parisian police intelligence, which described a complex and heterogeneous social and political movement that political organizations and unions were attempting to direct.

Fact checking by the Agence France-Prese and TF1 has relied heavily on image and video reverse searches. Some media sources have made efforts to allow student protestors to respond directly to government ministers or proclamations, challenging the hegemony of official statements and news sources while students protest poor classroom conditions and wider economic grievances.
