= National High School Student Movement =

French student union

Mouvement national lycéen
- National High School Student Movement
- Founded: 2016
- Headquarters: Paris, France
- Location: France
- Members: 1,500
- Co-General Secretaries: Auryane Diony, Capucine Suran, Gaspar Buzare
- Affiliations: OBESSU
- Website: www.mnl-syndicat.fr

The National High School Student Movement (French: Mouvement national lycéen, MNL), formerly known as the National High School Students' Union - Syndical and Democratic (French: Union Nationale Lycéenne - Syndicale et Démocratique, UNL-SD), is a French high school students' union created in 2016 as a breakaway from the National High School Students' Union. It is legally structured as a 1901 association law.

== History ==
=== Creation ===
In 2016, under the name National High School Students' Union - Syndical and Democratic, the group was fully integrated into the High School Students' Union. They called for a statutory congress to amend the UNL's statutes. After the refusal by the leadership, members of the national team and some federations organized this congress themselves. By majority vote, a new national team was elected, and the split was formalized, resulting in the separation between the UNL and the UNL-SD.

The creation of the UNL-SD as an independent entity was officially recognized in 2017 under the 1901 law for associations. In early 2019, the organization changed its name to the Mouvement National Lycéen (MNL).

=== Position among high school student unions ===
Running under the "Le progrès lycéen" lists, the MNL secured around 22% of the vote in the 2018 Conseil Supérieur de l’Éducation high school elections, placing second among student organizations.

In 2021, the MNL obtained 17% of the vote in the same elections, ranking third among high school student unions.

== Actions and positions ==
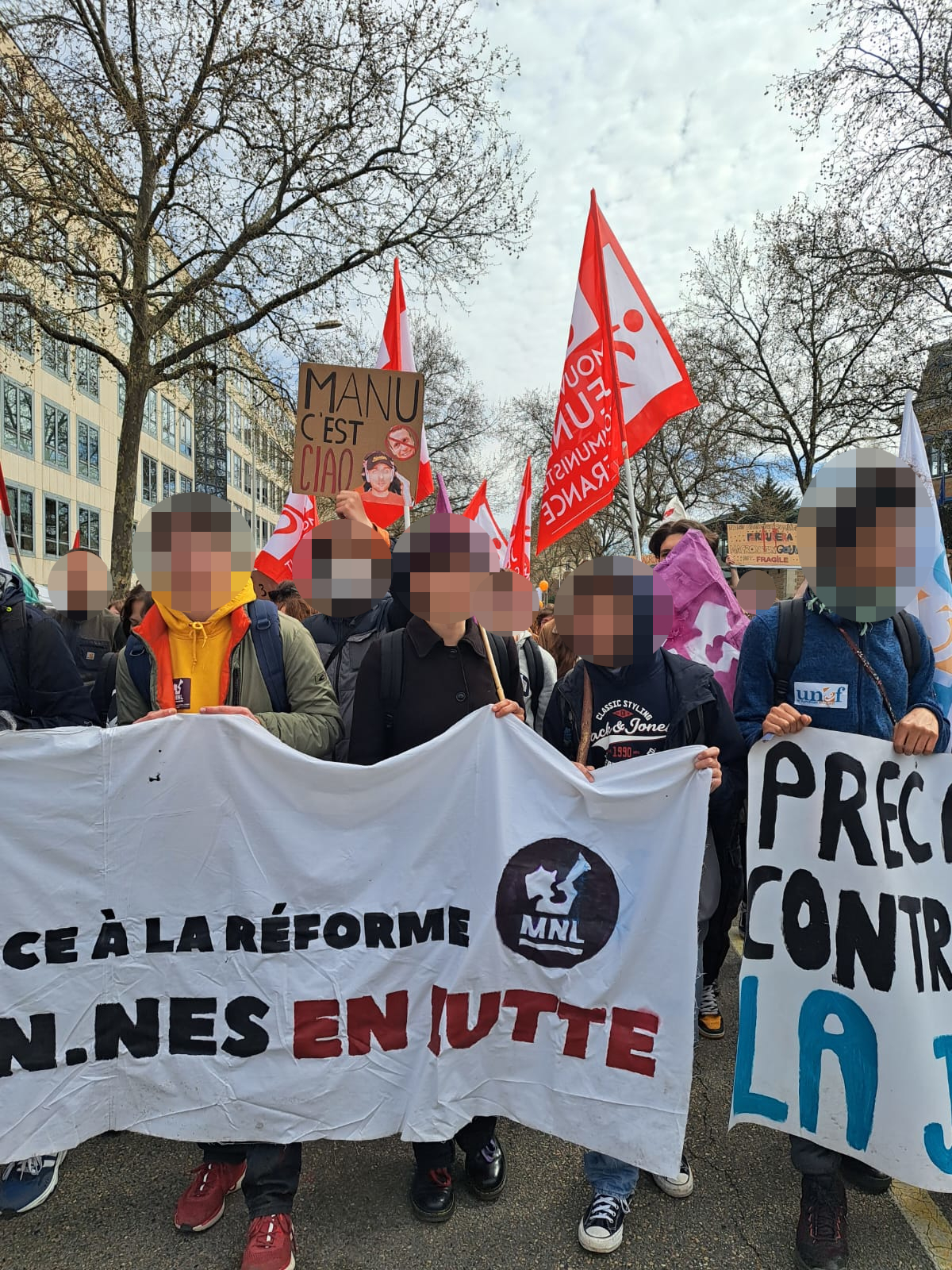
Protest against the pension reform in Lyon with a banner on which there is the MNL logo

In 2017, the UNL-SD opposed a reform of the Baccalauréat, particularly criticizing inequalities it believed were introduced by continuous assessment and the loss of anonymity during exams. The union also opposed the creation of Parcoursup, criticizing the platform's selective algorithm, its lack of ranking for applicants' preferences, and the drastic reduction in the number of choices available to students. In response to these reforms, the UNL-SD initiated its first protest on January 15, 2018, the day Parcoursup was launched.

In early 2019, following Greta Thunberg's visit to France to denounce political inaction on climate change, the MNL, along with other high school and student organizations like the UNL and UNEF, participated in the student climate strike initiated and coordinated by Youth for Climate France.

In May 2019, the MNL supported teachers' unions in organizing a strike against the Baccalauréat reform, claiming in a statement: "Students are not being taken hostage by striking teachers but by a ministry that refuses to budge".

On May 3, 2021, the MNL helped organize the "#BacNoir" protest, which mobilized between 100 and 200 schools. The MNL called for continued mobilization on May 5, with support from the FCPE (Parents' Federation). According to Antonin Nouvian, MNL's General Secretary, the goal was to "maintain pressure until the government reconsiders its position".

In 2023, the MNL joined the social movement against President Emmanuel Macron’s pension reform. The MNL called for high school blockades and urged students to join citywide protests during the national strike days. On March 23, nearly 400 high schools across France were blocked. The MNL also used these protest days to reiterate its opposition to Parcoursup, mandatory national service (SNU), and the LOPMI law.
