= Union Syndicale Lycéenne =

French high school student union

The Union Syndicale Lycéenne (USL; French pronunciation: [ynjɔ̃ sɛ̃dikal liseɛn]; lit. 'High School Students' Union') is a French high school students' union that was established in 2023. It continues the legacy of the National High School Union (UNL), founded in 1994, and La Voix Lycéenne (LVL; lit. 'The Students' Voice'), created in 2021.

Its current president is Ryad Rani, who has served since April 2026.

== History ==
=== National High School Union ===
It was founded in 1994. It aims to defend and represent secondary school students, in the development of student democracy and the defence of student rights, as well as running campaigns on matters such as combating discrimination and defending the rights of students who are undocumented migrants.

UNL frequently organizes protests and public demonstrations, particularly when the right was in power between 2002 and 2012; the union demonstrated in the streets every year since 2001.

In October 2009, UNL-D (previous name of the Syndicat général des lycéens), after denouncing "fraudulent" practices during votes at the association's national council, split from the union.

In 2016, a new split led to the creation of UNL-SD which later became the National High School Student Movement (MNL).

The UNL ceased its activities at the beginning of 2021 and was placed in bankruptcy.

=== La Voix Lycéenne ===
In 2021, UNL activists founded the union "La Voix Lycéenne" (LVL), which aligns with the same approach, explaining that, in their view, "unions are no longer able to propose effective modes of action against government reforms.". L'Étudiant analyses that VL directly takes over from UNL.

In 2023, the organisation joined SUD Éducation Paris and Le Poing Levé Lycée unions in filing an appeal against the French government's ban on wearing abaya in schools.

=== Union Syndicale Lycéenne ===
==== Creation ====
It was founded in 2023 from the fusion La Voix Lycéenne and locals French high-school unions.

On November 3, 2023, the newly created USL claims to have emerged from the merger of several major high school unions (LVL, FIDL, Union Pirate Lycéenne, MNL, ULF, IEL Syndicat, CSTE, and AEB).

However, the two other main unions, MNL and FIDL, refute this merger. France Info states: "Contrary to what some student representatives have indicated [...], this is not a merger of the three high school unions, but the creation of a new high school union."

==== Positioning and actions ====
It aims to defend and represent secondary school students, in the development of student democracy and the defence of student rights, as well as running campaigns on matters such as fighting all types of discrimination and advocating for students who are undocumented migrants.

The Union Syndicale Lycéenne frequently organizes protests and public demonstrations, blockades in high-schools, and took a prominent role in the 2023 social movement against the unpopular pension reform, with hundreds of schools overrun throughout the country.

== Presidencies ==
- 1994 : Samuel Gion, founding president
- 1995 : Michaël Delafosse, first elected president
- December 1997 – December 1998 : Issam Krimi (elected by the 1st congress)
- December 1998 – Mai 1999 : Lô Vitting (elected by the 1st convention)
- May 1999 – January 2000: Benjamin Vételé (elected by the CN of May 1999)
- January 2000 – October 2001 : Perrine Corcuff (elected by the 2nd congress)
- October 2001 – September 2002 : Stéphan Babonneau (elected by the CN of October 2001 then by the 3rd congress)
- September 2002 – January 2004 : Lucas Jourdain (elected by the CN of September 2002)
- January 2004 – September 2005 : Constance Blanchard (elected by the 4th congress)
- September 2005 – September 2006 : Karl Stoeckel (elected by the CN of September 2005 then by the 5th congress)
- September 2006 – March 2008 Floréale Mangin (elected by the CN of September 2006)
- March 2008 – September 2008 : Florian Lecoultre (elected by the 6th congress)
- September 2008 - October 2009 : Lucie Bousser (elected by the CN of September 2008)
- October 2009 - October 2010 : Antoine Evennou (elected by the CN of October 2009, then by the 7th congress).
- October 2010 - October 2012 : Victor Colombani (elected by the CN of October 2010)
- 2022 : Colin Champion
- 2023 : Gwenn Thomas-Alvès
- 2024
- April 2026 —: Ryad Rani

== See also ==
- Students' union
- OBESSU
