= Fuel protests in 2026 =

Protests against fuel prices and shortages

In 2026, multiple fuel protests broke out around the world or were worsened due to the 2026 Iran war fuel crisis caused by the Strait of Hormuz crisis in the 2026 Iran war and escalation of the Yemeni civil war.

== Asia ==
=== Bangladesh ===
In September, fuel protests occurred in Bangladesh. Nahid Islam, an opposition leader, said in a protest rally in Dhaka that the crowds were marching in part “against those who are forming syndicates around gas, oil and electricity and trying to increase prices.”

=== Indonesia ===
Starting in June, fuel protests began across Indonesia after the government raised gasoline prices up by 32%. About 1,500 student protesters attempted to march toward the Hotel Indonesia traffic circle in Jakarta but were blocked by riot police. More than 6,000 police and soldiers were deployed to secure the area, including the presidential palace, who redirected the demonstrators to protest at the parliament building and the National Monument park, but they refused.

In September, residents in Makassar experienced shortages of cooking gas, rolling blackouts, and gasoline rationing. The Indonesian government implemented a new rationing system organized by even and odd license plate numbers. On September 14, taxi drivers held a protest against the new rationing system. Students in Yogyakarta also demonstrated but were broken up by government forces.

=== Philippines ===
In September, fuel protests erupted in the Philippines. Fishermen in Manila Bay were confined to port after weeks of monsoon rains due to fuel shortages. Bus and ride-share drivers in Quezon City went on strike and marched against the fuel price increases. The Philippine government offered a one-time payment of just $80 to public transportation drivers, which failed to quell the protests.

=== Syria ===
On 13 September, the Syrian government implemented fuel price increases of up to 40%. Protests soon erupted nationwide calling for the price increases to be reversed and for the Energy Minister Mohammed al-Bashir to resign. Several groups of demonstrators blocked highways and burned tires, preventing oil tankers from transporting oil to Aleppo. A hearing is scheduled at the People's Assembly on 20 September.

On 17 September, al-Bashir addressed the protests, announcing a three grade system of pricing and the resumption of local refineries to combat the fuel crisis.

=== Vietnam ===
In September, Grab drivers called for a boycott to protest low pay caused in part by rising fuel costs.

== Europe ==
=== France ===
On 15 September, fuel protests erupted in France, the price of diesel reaching a historic high of €2.37 per liter ($2.72 per liter). Demonstrators included Fishermen, police officers, farmers, construction workers, energy workers, medical workers, university staff and other groups. Protesters blocked roads and burned tires to prevent oil tankers from travelling. Fishermen in southern France blocked ports and petrol depots.

On 16 September, Prime Minister Sebastien Lecornu said that the government would increase its petrol subsidies for fishing to the maximum authorized level allowed under EU rules, but this did not quell the protests which resumed on 17 September.

President Emmanuel Macron called for a G7 emergency meeting to address the fuel crisis.

Yellow vests protests were organised on social media and occurred on 17 October. On 17 October, the demonstrations united with contemporaneous riotous student protests and marked an escalation in civil unrest. Hundreds of thousands of people joined. In Paris, huge crowds of demonstrators gathered around Place de la République, vehicles were set on fire, and shops were looted. The Monument à la République was vandalised and had a giant yellow vest placed onto the statue. The French Interior Ministry stated that 550,000 people took part in the demonstrations, while the CGT trade union estimated the number of participants at 800,000. French Prime Minister Sébastien Lecornualso announced that 1,200 people had been arrested and 150 police officers had been injured. The combined protests marked an escalation of civil unrest in France, with the Hôtel de Ville in Limoges burning down after being firebombed by rioters.

=== Ireland ===
A series of nationwide protests occurred from 7–14 April in the Republic of Ireland and Northern Ireland.

On 12 April, the Irish government announced €505 million support package for affected industries. On 14 April, Michael Healy-Rae resigned as a Minister of State.

=== Portugal ===
In September, drivers in Portugal staged mass honking protests, causing traffic jams across the country including the 25 de Abril Bridge between Lisbon and Almada. Other drivers took part in a slow-drive march toward the Galp refinery in Sines.

== Americas ==
=== Bolivia ===
In September, fuel shortages and rising costs have triggered protests and roadblocks by labour unions, Indigenous groups and supporters of former leftist president Evo Morales. Protesters have blocked roads using fallen trees, dirt mounds, and tires. On 4 September, coca growers from the Chapare Province took part in a protest march against the Bolivian government.

=== Guatemala ===
In September, transport workers, taxi drivers and Indigenous people protested against rising fuel prices, demanding more than stopgap measures like price caps and subsidies and a shift away from fossil fuels. Across the country marches were held, and in Villa Neuva, cars were set on fire.
