= Muslim Students of France =

French Muslim student association

Étudiants musulmans de France
- Abbreviation: EMF
- Formation: 1989
- Type: Student association
- Website: www.emf-asso.fr

Étudiants musulmans de France (EMF; English: Muslim Students of France) is a French student association founded in 1989. It operates through local branches and provides student support and representation. Its activities and alleged links to the Muslim Brotherhood have attracted public debate. EMF describes itself as independent and rejects allegations of ideological or political affiliation.

== History ==
The association was established in Bordeaux in 1989 under the name Union islamique des étudiants de France (UISEF). According to its institutional history, it initially sought to provide support and a solidarity network for students, particularly those arriving from abroad. It adopted its current name at a congress in Limoges in November 1996.

In 1997, twenty-two left-wing organisations issued a statement accusing EMF of religious proselytism and pressure on students of North African origin, including encouraging young women to wear the hijab.

After the November 2015 Paris attacks, EMF released a video expressing solidarity with the victims and calling for national unity. Entitled Nous sommes unis ("We are united"), it featured students holding signs with the corresponding hashtag.

=== Student elections ===
EMF participates in elections to the regional student welfare bodies known as CROUS. In 2002, it received 7,191 votes (6.4% nationally) and won eleven seats.

In Grenoble, EMF won 22% of the vote in 2002, reaching 82% in one student residence. In 2004, it obtained two seats, in Créteil and Grenoble. It won five in 2006.

=== Cooperation with left-wing organisations ===
In March 2025, EMF joined RED Jeunes, the Union syndicale lycéenne and the antifascist organisation La Jeune Garde in establishing Génération Espoir Dignité Résistance (Génération EDR), a collective campaigning against Islamophobia. In an interview published by Politis at the collective's launch, its representatives described a campaign against Islamophobia and the far right that would bring together the networks and experience of participating organisations.

In April 2026, StreetPress reported that the Ministry of the Interior had notified Génération EDR of its intention to dissolve the collective. The ministry alleged that it continued the activities of La Jeune Garde and encouraged violence against political opponents. Génération EDR disputed these allegations. Its co-founder Yassine Benyettou described its activities as public discussions, poster campaigns and interviews about discrimination, while its lawyer defended the collective's peaceful character.

=== Participation in the 2026 student protests ===
In October 2026, Le Point reported that EMF and its local branches had circulated calls to join student protests between 5 and 9 October. According to the report, the association's Belfort branch had already marched alongside secondary-school students on 1 October. EMF's appeal supported demands for improved study conditions and opposed government austerity measures.

== Political positions ==
In 2004, EMF declined to identify itself with either the political left or right. According to Omar Youssef Souleimane in Le Figaro, EMF supported La France Insoumise in the 2022 presidential election.

== Funding ==
According to a December 2002 report in Le Figaro, EMF acknowledged receiving approximately €10,000 annually from Saudi sources, which it described as unconditional.

In January 2002, Le Point reported that EMF held 32 shares in Al Taqwa Bank. The report discussed allegations linking the bank to Islamist financing. EMF said it had invested 18,000 francs after being directed towards an institution that complied with Muslim investment principles, and that it had believed the bank to be Swiss.

== Debate over religious and political links ==
Criticism of EMF has included allegations of proselytism and connections with the Muslim Brotherhood. In 2004, Grenoble university officials told Le Monde that they had not observed proselytism by the association.

In 2002, Michèle Tribalat questioned EMF's interpretation of laïcité, while L'Express examined whether its public presentation differed from its underlying aims.

In 2013, the Haut Conseil à l'intégration raised concerns about the UOIF's influence through EMF and referred to a call to boycott non-halal cafeterias at Lille III.

In 2021, Le Figaro reported 26 branches and quoted former UOIF official Mohamed Louizi describing EMF as the Brotherhood's student wing.

Anthropologist Florence Bergeaud-Blackler has characterised EMF as part of the Muslim Brotherhood's student network. In a February 2024 response reported by Le Figaro Étudiant, EMF rejected that assessment and stated that it was independent of ideological and political affiliations.

In July 2024, Le Figaro reported on EMF campus activities with Humani'Terre. The latter charity was reported to be under an investigation opened in November 2023 concerning suspected terrorist financing and related offences.

In May 2024, territorial intelligence director Bertrand Chamoulaud alleged that EMF sought to use student representation to remove pork from university cafeteria menus.

A report published by the French Ministry of the Interior in May 2025 placed EMF within its account of the Muslim Brotherhood's organisational networks in France. It described the establishment of a student structure in 1989 and its subsequent development as EMF.

== See also ==
- Islam in France
