= Alliance Police Nationale =

French trade union

Alliance Police Nationale is a French police union established May 9, 1995, in Aubervilliers, Seine-Saint-Denis. Alliance Police Nationale is the result of merging two unions:

- Syndicat indépendant de la Police nationale (SIPN), representing uniformed police (established in 1951)
- Syndicat national des enquêteurs (SNE), representing detectives (established in 1990)

A third union, the Syndicat des gradés de la Police nationale (SGPN), joined in 1997.
