= Killing of Nahel Merzouk =

2023 police shooting in France

- Image of Merzouk distributed by his mother
- Date: 27 June 2023
- Location: Nanterre, France; 48.8985°N 2.2213°E
- Type: Police shooting
- Outcome: Mass urban riots
- Deaths: Nahel Merzouk
- Accused: Florian M.
- Charges: Voluntary homicide by a person in authority

On 27 June 2023, Nahel Merzouk, a 17-year-old French youth of Algerian descent, was shot at point-blank range and killed by police officer Florian M., when he did not comply with an order to stop and instead attempted to drive away in Nanterre, a suburb of Paris, France. Initial reporting on the incident (informed by police statements) was later contradicted by a video posted online, which led to widespread protests and riots. Symbols of the state such as town halls, schools, police stations, and other buildings were attacked. The Interior Ministry reported that more than 5,000 vehicles had been set on fire, along with 10,000 garbage cans; nearly 1,000 buildings had been burnt, damaged or looted; 250 police stations and gendarmeries had been attacked; and more than 700 police officers had been injured.

The killing—condemned by President Emmanuel Macron as "inexplicable" and "inexcusable"—became part of a broader public debate regarding aggressive French law enforcement, racial profiling, immigration, and the stakes of naming the subsequent suburban violence "rioting" rather than "revolts". On 28 June, the president of the National Assembly, Yaël Braun-Pivet, asked deputies "to respect a minute of silence in Nahel's memory".

== Background ==
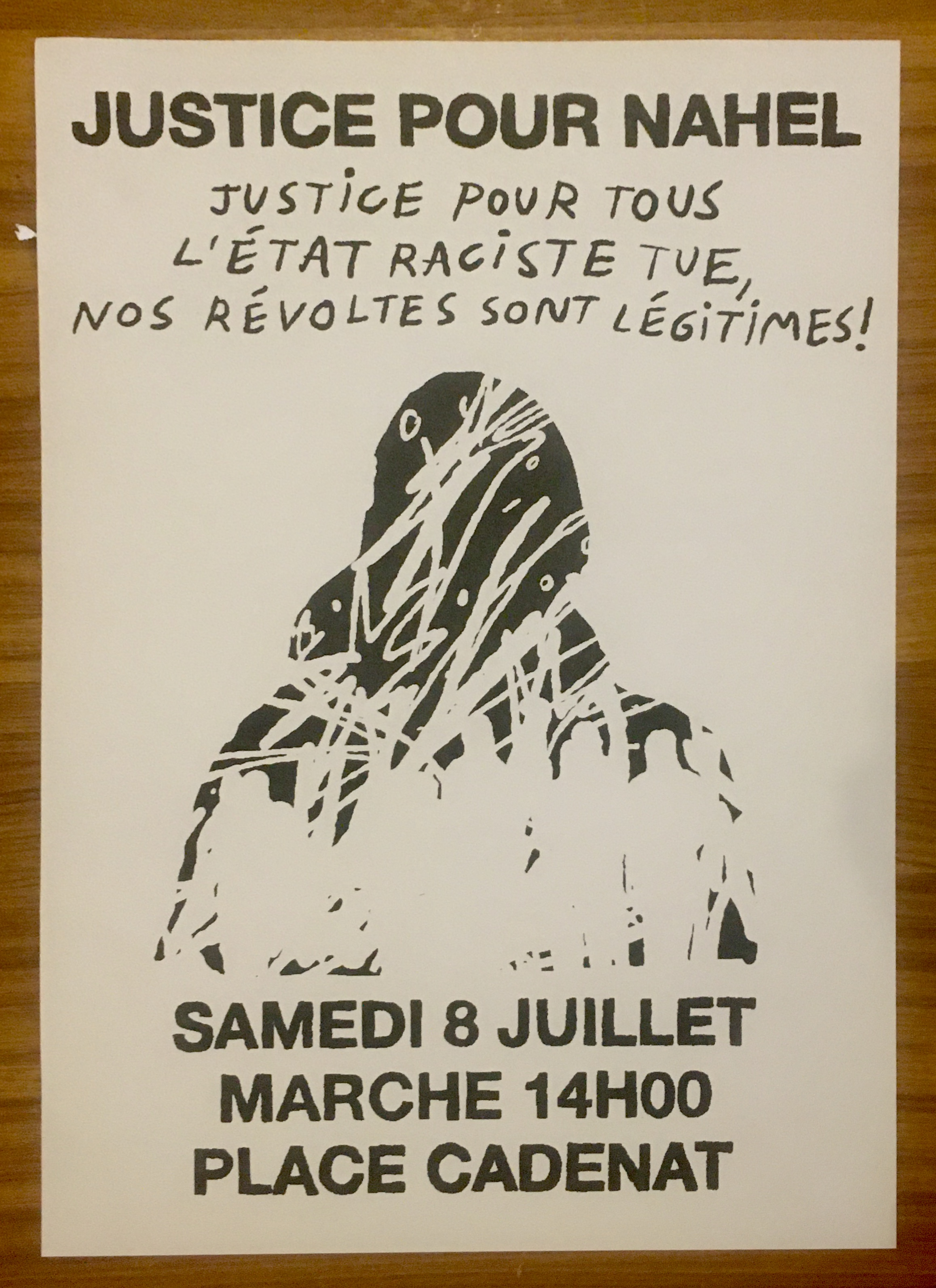
"Justice for Nahel, justice for all, the racist state kills, our revolts are legitimate!" Poster for a demonstration in Marseille, following the police shooting

France saw a rise in police violence in France in the years before the killing. In 2017, a law was passed permitting police to shoot at a vehicle fleeing a traffic stop, if the driver was putting the passengers or passersby at risk. This shooting was the third fatal shooting that occurred during a traffic stop in France in 2023. In 2020, there were three deaths, followed by two in 2021, and 13 in 2022, leading to the indictment of five police officers. The victims were often people of black or Maghrebi origin, leading to allegations of systemic racism within the French police. In May 2023, national representatives at the United Nations Human Rights Council criticized the country's police force and urged the implementation of significant measures to address excessive use of force in demonstrations. The French government has frequently downplayed instances of police violence, sometimes even avoiding the use of the term itself, while police unions opposed repealing or revising the 2017 law.

On 19 July 2016, Adama Traoré, a 24-year-old black man, died while in custody after being restrained and apprehended by the police. This incident sparked widespread public outcry and protests, which reignited in May 2020 when the officers involved were cleared of any wrongdoing. On 14 June 2023, Alhoussein Camara, a 19-year-old, was killed during a road check in Angoulême. His body was repatriated to Conakry, Guinea, by his family and the Guinean authorities. While there, they appealed to France for justice to be served.

In November 2026, France's upper house of parliament gave the measure its final green light. Under the new rules, an officer who opens fire is treated as having acted within the law. A person killed by police gunfire is presumed to have been lawfully shot. Opponents have branded the legislation a "licence to kill."

The bill had been a long-cherished objective of the far right. It drew strong resistance from left-wing parliamentarians, human rights groups, and trade unions, who warned that it would increase the number of fatal police shootings and complicate the search for justice by bereaved families. Left-wing blocs in parliament signalled they would take the matter to the Constitutional Council in a final attempt to stop the law from taking effect. Morris Tidball-Binz, the UN special rapporteur on extrajudicial executions, raised concerns that the legislation risked entrenching impunity for officers. The French government, by contrast, backed the bill. Interior Minister Laurent Nunez described it as a necessary safeguard for officers operating in hazardous conditions.

== Victim ==
Nahel Merzouk (French pronunciation: [naɛl mɛʁzuk]; Arabic: نايل مرزوق) was a 17-year-old enrolled at the Lycée Louis-Blériot in Suresnes, where he attended classes for six months before dropping out and working as a pizza delivery driver in Nanterre. He did not have a driving license allowing him to drive the rented Mercedes he died in. According to a paramedic who knew him, his father left his mother before he was born. According to his family's lawyers, Merzouk had no criminal record but the prosecutor confirmed he was "known to police", particularly for resisting arrest, and had been charged with resisting arrest the previous weekend and five times since 2021. According to information leaked to Europe 1, his police file (TAJ) included 15 recorded incidents, including the use of false license plates and driving without insurance.

== Shooting ==
=== Prosecution version ===
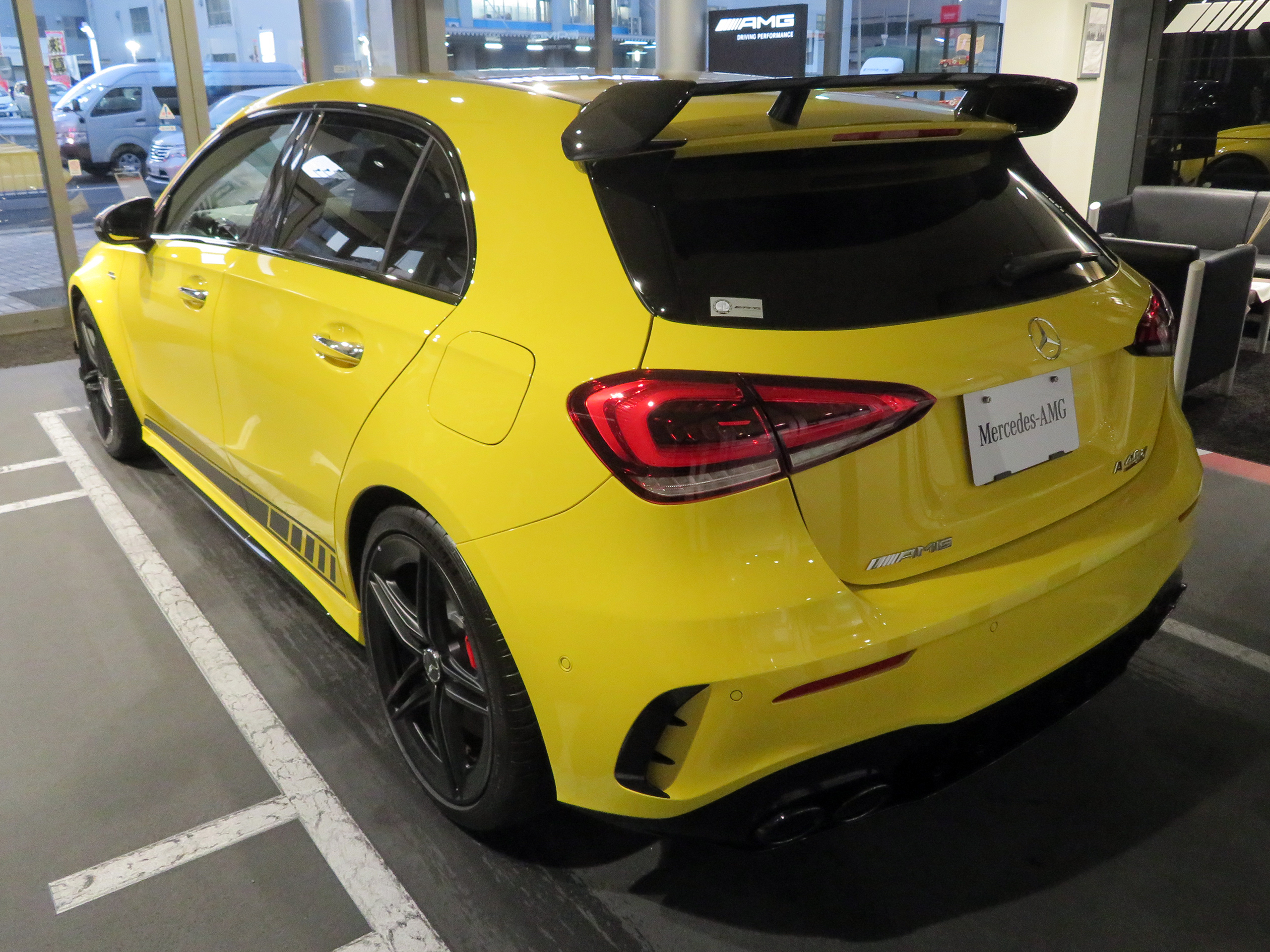
A yellow Mercedes-Benz A-Class (W177), similar to the one driven by Merzouk

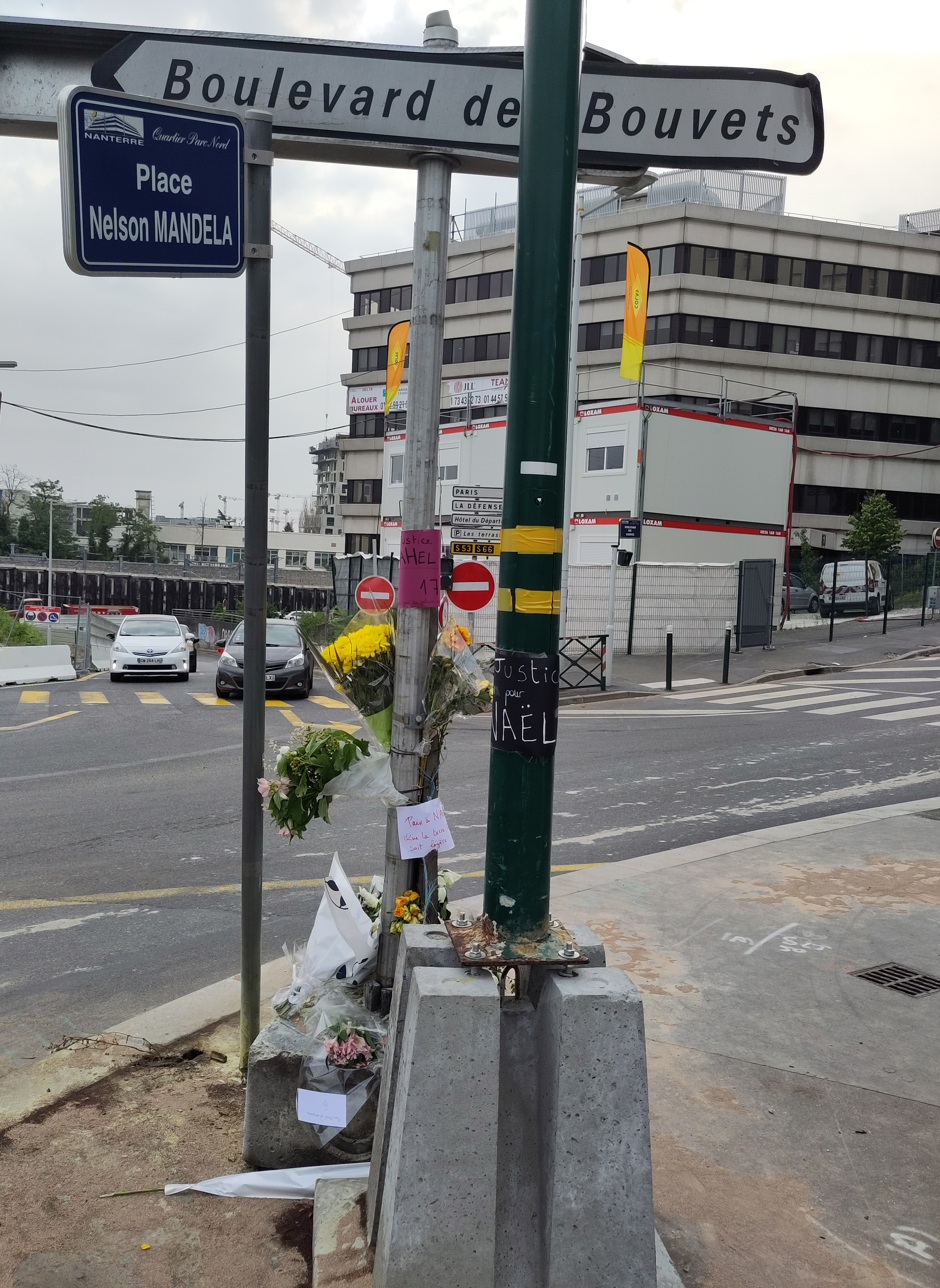
Nelson Mandela Square in Nanterre after the killing

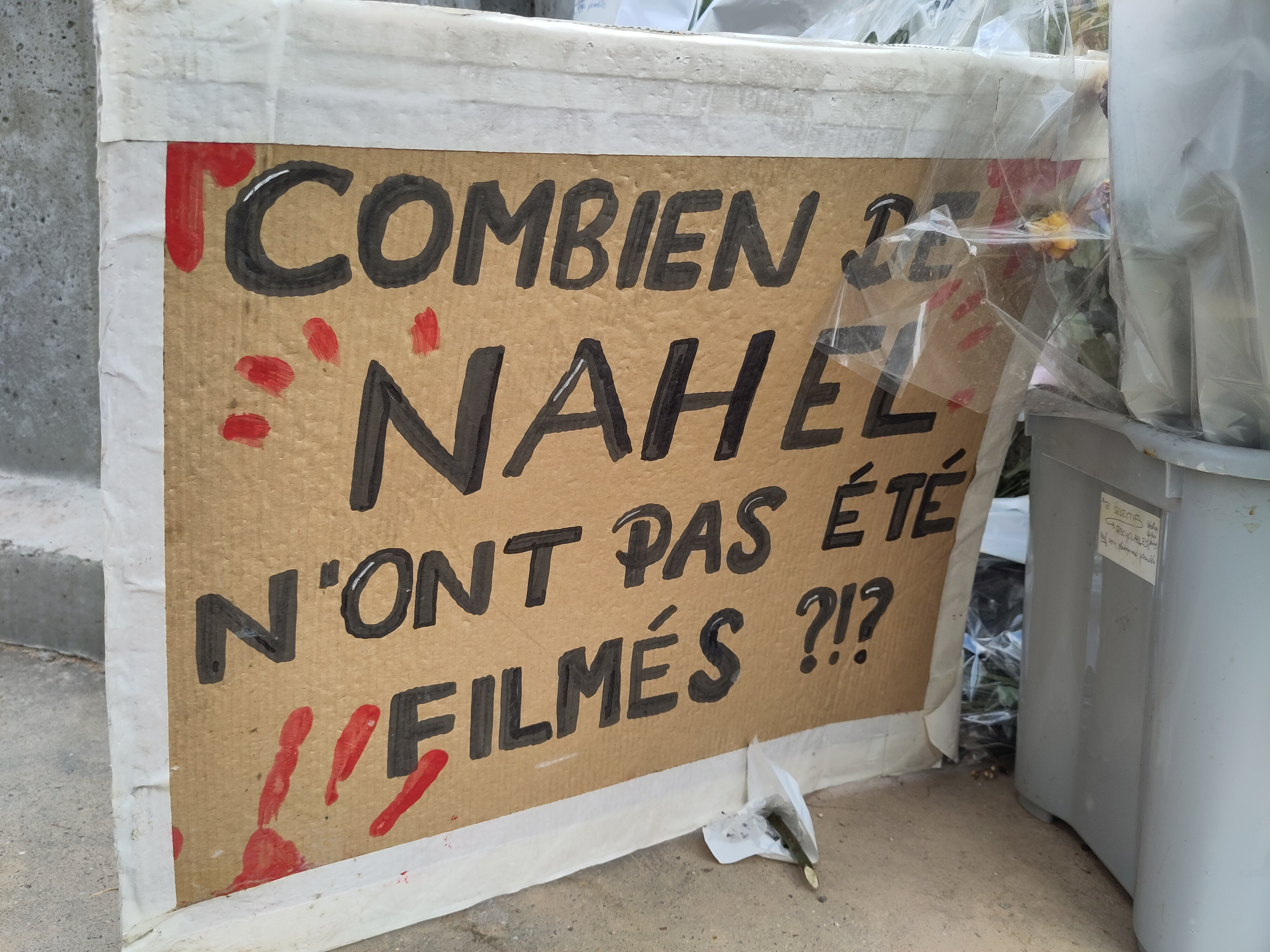
Sign at Nelson Mandela Square: «Combien de Nahel n'ont pas été filmés ?!?» (How many Nahels have not been filmed?)

According to the public prosecutor of Nanterre, two Paris Police Prefecture motorcycle officers noticed a Mercedes-Benz A Class AMG with a Polish license plate driving at high speed in a bus lane, driven by a young-looking person at around 7:55 am. The officers activated their warning signals (audible and visual) and indicated to the driver of the car, then stationary at a red traffic light, to stop. The vehicle started moving and ran the red light. The officers followed the car and alerted their superiors via radio. The car committed multiple traffic violations, endangering a pedestrian and a cyclist.

Due to traffic congestion, the vehicle was eventually forced to stop. The police officers got off their motorcycles, pointed their guns at the driver, and ordered him to turn off the engine. Instead, the vehicle started to pull away, and one of the police officers, 38-year-old Florian M. fired a shot at the driver at point-blank range. The vehicle continued forward before crashing into the street sign marking the Nelson Mandela Square at 8:19 am. The rear passenger was arrested when he exited the vehicle. The front right passenger fled. Florian M. provided first aid to the driver, who was pronounced dead at 9:15 am.

Police records indicate that Merzouk was known for previous incidents in which he failed to comply with traffic stops. On the day of his death, it is alleged that he "disobeyed and committed several traffic offences, endangering the lives of a pedestrian and a cyclist", and refused to turn off the ignition. Police shot Merzouk when the Mercedes began moving forward after it had been stopped.

The use of firearms by the police, during traffic controls in the event of failure to comply, is currently regulated by a law adopted in 2017.

Authorities arrested Florian M. on suspicion of "voluntary homicide by a person in authority". Police unions complained against the arrest. Minister of the Interior Gérald Darmanin said he would seek the dissolution of a small far-right union, Syndicat France Police, which welcomed the shooting of Merzouk.

=== Police version challenged by a video ===
According to the police, Florian M. fired his weapon as the young driver was about to run him over. This version, citing self-defense, was challenged after the publication of a video showing that the car was not in a position to harm the police officers and was not heading towards them. According to Le Monde, "the 50-second sequence, which has gone viral on social media, has literally swept away the language elements initially disseminated by police sources and repeated by some media." The video shows that the two police officers were on the driver's side of the Mercedes. The car was moving off when the officer fired the shot at point-blank range.

=== Version from the third passenger ===
On 30 June 2023, a third passenger aboard the Mercedes testified that Merzouk received several buttstrokes. According to them, the third buttstroke made Merzouk release the brake pedal, causing the car to move forward, given that the gearbox was automatic. According to BFM TV, this version differs from that put forward by the police, as according to the Prefect of Police of Paris Laurent Nuñez: "the driver had first turned off the engine, restarted the vehicle, then left. It was in this context that the police officer used his firearm."

== Investigation ==
Florian M. is under investigation for manslaughter and was placed in custody for the charge of "voluntary homicide by a person in authority". The police have maintained that the shooting was an act of self-defense, as they argue that Merzouk was driving towards the officer. However, since the video was released, this claim has faced significant criticism. Yassine Bouzrou, a lawyer representing Merzouk, has stated that the video completely disproves this assertion and alleges that the brigadier (Note: Brigadier is a French police rank equivalent to sergeant.) had an "intention to kill". Other lawyers representing Merzouk have made similar remarks.

Two investigations have been initiated: "refusal to comply" against Merzouk, and "voluntary homicide by a person in authority" against Florian M. The latter investigation has been assigned to the General Inspectorate of the National Police (IGPN).

== Trial ==
On 3 June 2025, it was announced that Florian M. would go on trial in 2026 for the murder of Nahel Merzouk. It was expected to begin in the 2nd or 3rd quarter of 2026 per the Nanterre prosecutors office.

== Initial reactions ==
French President Emmanuel Macron declared the incident "inexcusable and unforgivable", adding that it "moved the entire nation". Macron's statements were a rare critique of French law enforcement from government officials. The BBC's Hugh Schofield attributed this to the effects of social media, allowing for the dissemination of such videos with ease, as well as fear stemming from the ensuing riots. Alliance Police nationale, the largest French police union, criticized Macron for "condemn[ing] our colleagues before justice has had the chance to speak". Far-right politician Marine Le Pen, leader of the National Rally party, dubbed Macron's statements as "excessive" and "irresponsible", adding that "the president is prepared to ignore constitutional principles in a bid to put out a potential fire." Left-wing politician and former La France Insoumise party leader Jean-Luc Mélenchon called for police reform. Éric Ciotti, party leader of the conservative party LR, expressed his support for the police, dubbing them defenders of collective security and denouncing the ensuing unrest as unjustified.

French football player Kylian Mbappé took to Twitter to denounce the incident as "unacceptable" and sent condolences to Merzouk's family. Mike Maignan, a footballer for AC Milan, stated on Twitter that "It's always for the same people that being in the wrong leads to death." FC Barcelona footballer Jules Koundé criticized the coverage of the incident, stating that news media were capitalizing on it to "distort the truth" and find excuses to criminalize Merzouk. French actor and comedian Omar Sy sent condolences to the family.

Merzouk's mother called for a "a revolt for my son" on TikTok. Merzouk's grandmother stated that she lacked forgiveness for the police and government, stating "They killed my grandson, now I don't care about anyone, they took my grandson from me, I will never forgive them in my life, never, never, never."

Le Parisien and BFM TV have been criticized for relaying the police's account without any caution in the early hours of the event, before changing their narrative in response to the video evidence and pressure from other media outlets.

The Algerian Ministry of Foreign Affairs expressed its "shock and consternation the brutal and tragic disappearance of the young Nahel", adding that it trusted the French government to assume its duty of protection and security for Algerian nationals on French territory. The Moroccan press was critical of what it called Algerian interference in internal French domestic affairs and use of the crisis to political advantage.

The Office of the United Nations High Commissioner for Human Rights asked France to address systemic racism within its police forces, and called for the protests to be peaceful.

A fundraiser on GoFundMe for the officer's family was set up by the far-right politician Jean Messiha. When it closed on 4 July, it had raised €1,636,200, far greater than the €200,000 raised in support of Merzouk's family. the officer's family will receive €625,000 after taxation and platform fees.

An article signed by more than one hundred personalities, including Angela Davis, Achille Mbembe, Thomas Piketty, Annie Ernaux, Eric Cantona, Judith Butler, Ken Loach, Adèle Haenel, Peter Gabriel, and Anne Teresa De Keersmaeker was published in L'Humanité, entitled "This time, everyone has seen" and calling for participation in the united march against police violence on July 15, 2023. They endorsed the demands of groups of families of victims and activist organizations.

=== Polemics on immigration ===
Céline Pina, in an op-ed in Atlantico, and Ivan Rioufol, in an op-ed in Causeur and during an appearance on CNews, opined that the violence was related to immigration and Islam. The Minister of the Interior Gérald Darmanin, when asked by a senator from The Republicans to describe "in what way" the rioters were French, replied that "there were many Kevins and Mattéos among those arrested" and said that he thought any identity-based reading of the events would be a mistake. Darmanin repeated that the policeman who shot Merzouk during a traffic check "obviously did not respect the law". The emphasis on immigration by LR was described by the magazine Marianne as part of a campaign strategy to attract Eric Zemmour and Marine Le Pen voters in upcoming elections.

== Unrest ==
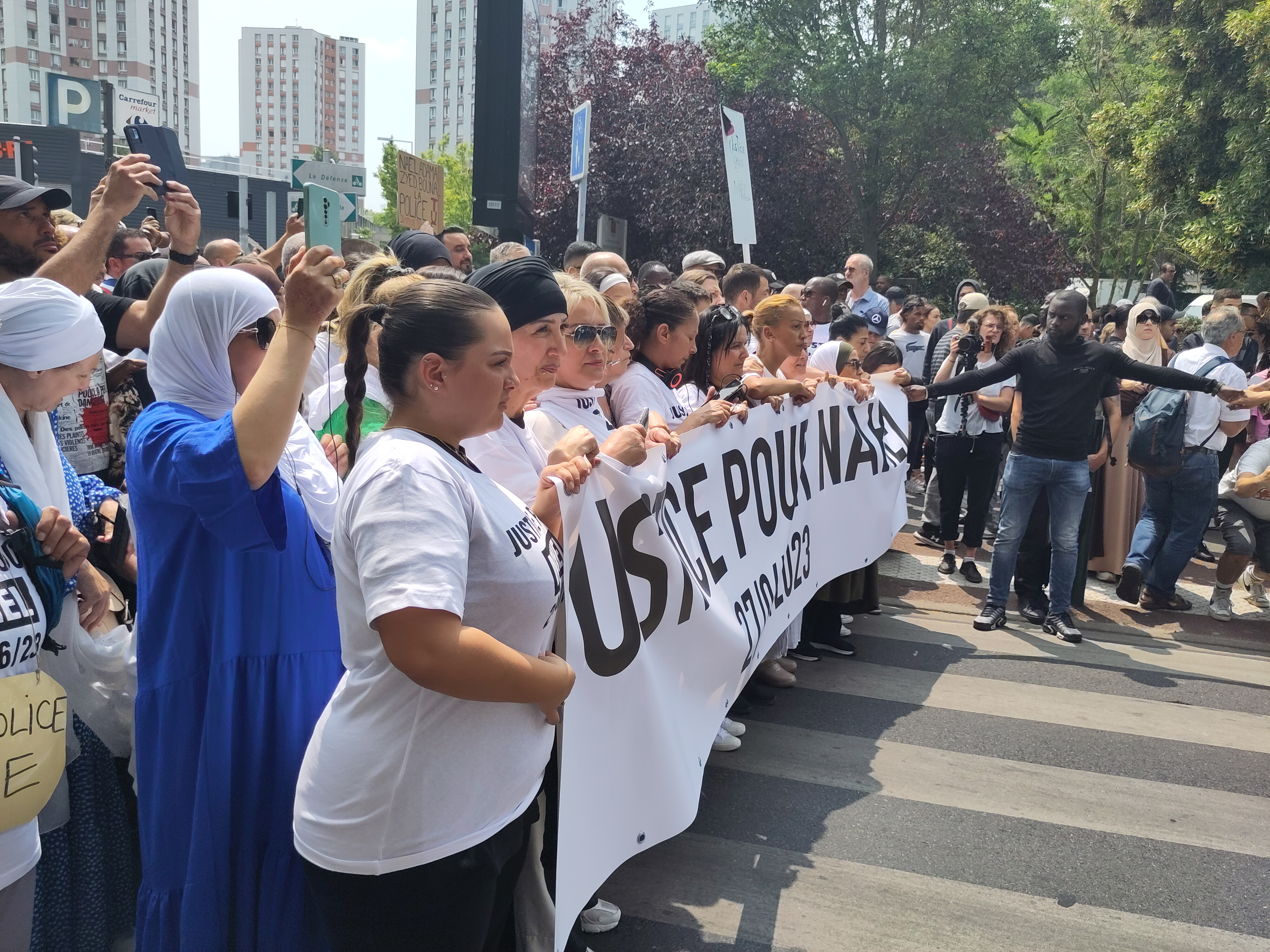
The White March demanding "justice for Nahel", Nanterre 29 June 2023

Public outcry and outrage over the shooting of Merzouk evolved into protests and riots (with some preferring the term "revolt"). In Nanterre, residents protested outside the police headquarters on 27 June, which escalated into rioting. Demonstrators set cars alight, trashed bus stops, and shot fireworks at police. In Viry-Châtillon, just south of Paris, a group of youths reportedly set a bus ablaze.

In Mantes-la-Jolie, a town 40 km northwest of Paris, the town hall was set ablaze after being firebombed on the night of 27 June, burning until 3:15 (CEST). Clashes continued throughout the night across France, including in Toulouse and Lille. Unrest was also reported in Asnières, Colombes, Suresnes, Aubervilliers, Clichy-sous-Bois and Mantes-la-Jolie.

By 29 June, over 150 people had been arrested, 24 officers had been injured, and 40 cars had been torched. Fearing greater unrest, Darmanin deployed 1,200 riot police and gendarmes in and around Paris, later adding an additional 2,000. On 29 June, he announced that the government would deploy 40,000 troops nationwide. According to Darmanin, over 1,350 vehicles were set on fire, and over 1,300 arrests were made in connection with the riots.

On the afternoon of June 29, thousands of people held a demonstration ("white march") led by mothers and activists in Nanterre demanding "justice for Nahel". A few hours later, the officer implicated in the killing, was indicted for intentional homicide and remanded in custody.

== See also ==
- Paris massacre of 1961
- Killing of Malik Oussekine and subsequent 1986–1987 protests in France
- 2005 French riots following the death of Zyed Benna, 17, and Bouna Traoré, 15
- 2007 Villiers-le-Bel riots following the deaths of Moushin S., 15, and Larami S., 16
- 2009 French riots following the death of Mohamed Benmouna, 21
- 2025 Paris Saint-Germain celebration riots
