= 2023 Paris riots =

2023 Paris riots may also refer to:

- 2023 French pension reform unrest
- Nahel Merzouk riots
