= Nahel Merzouk riots =

June–July 2023 riots in France

- Part of the French banlieue riots
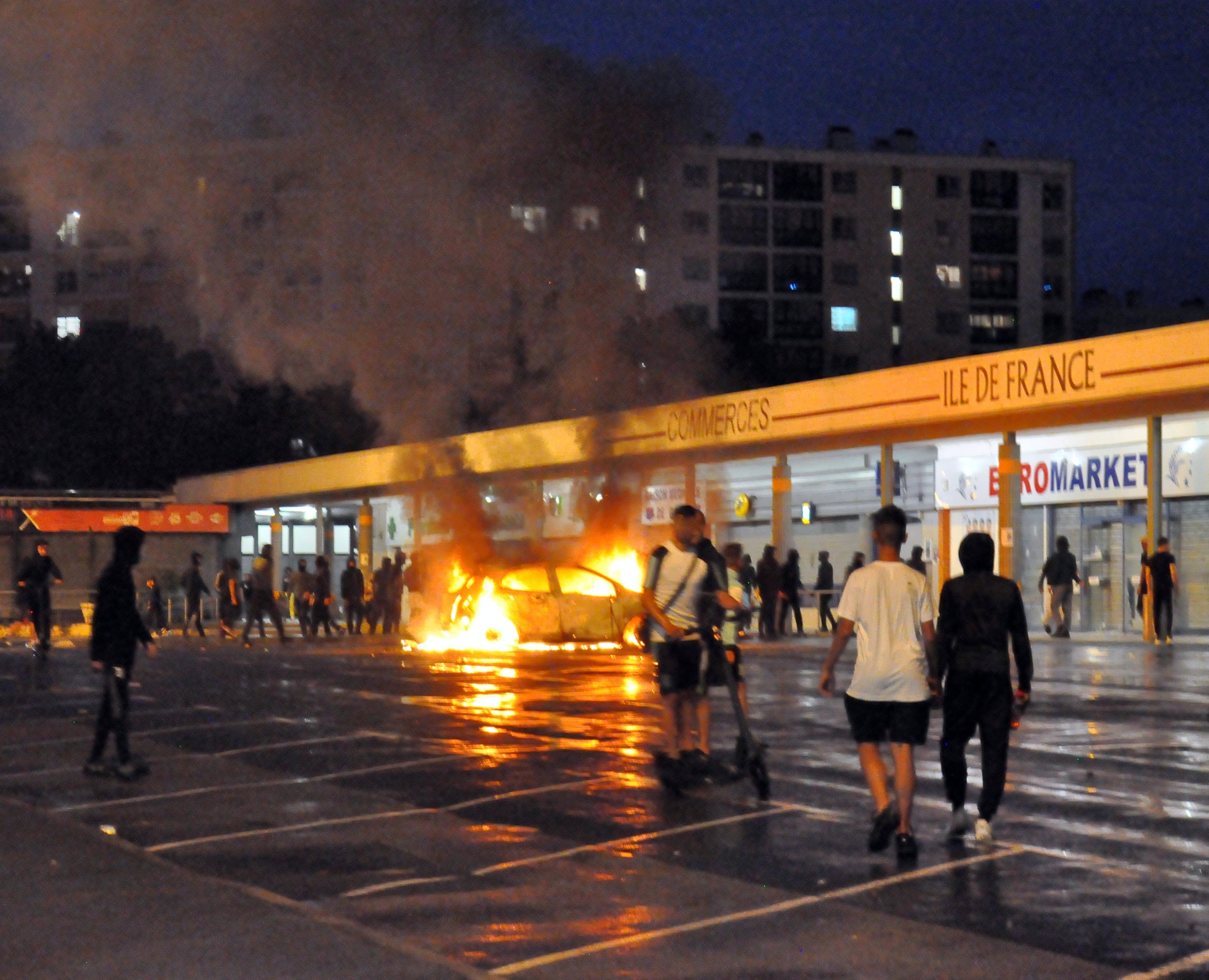
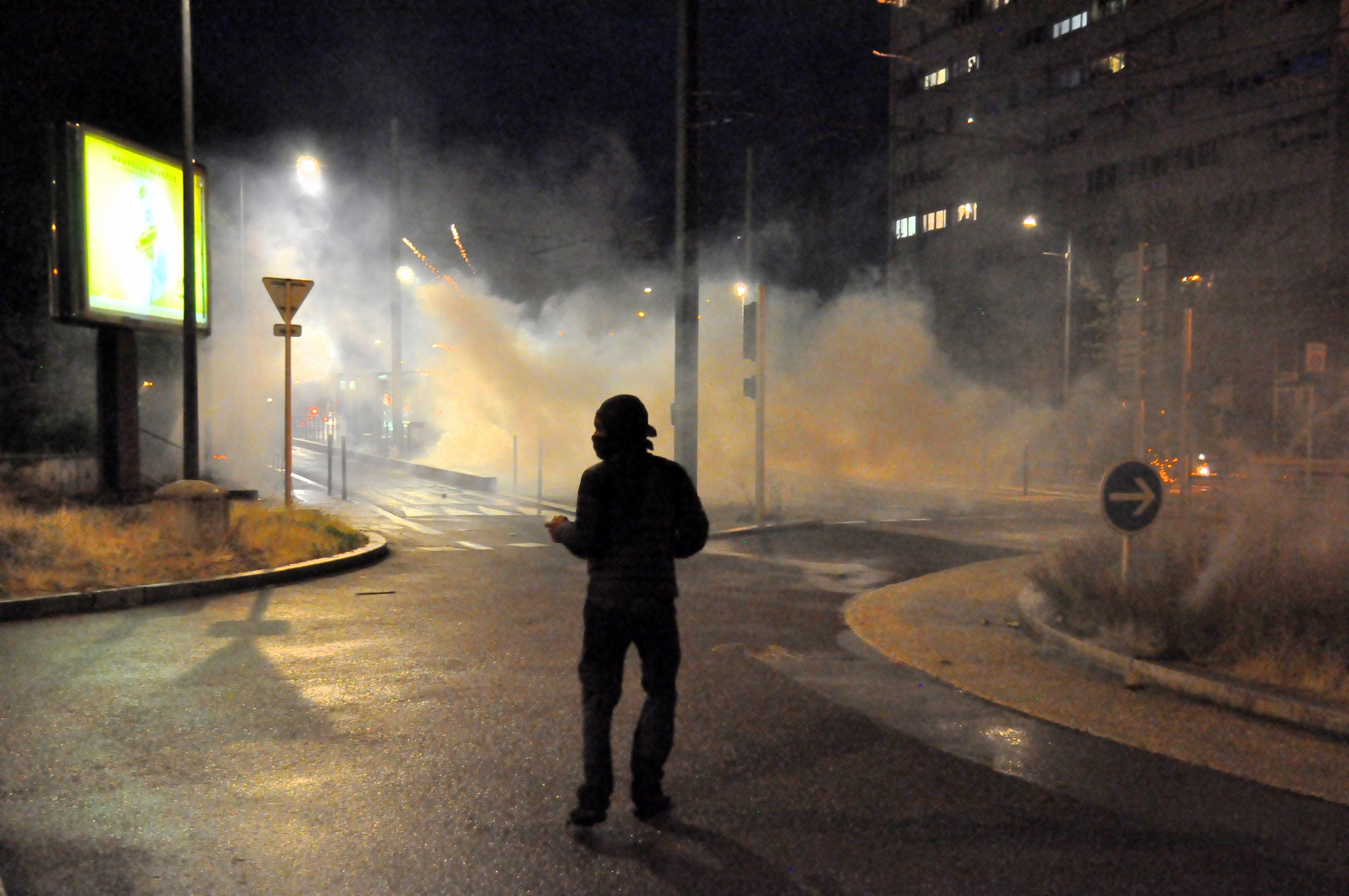
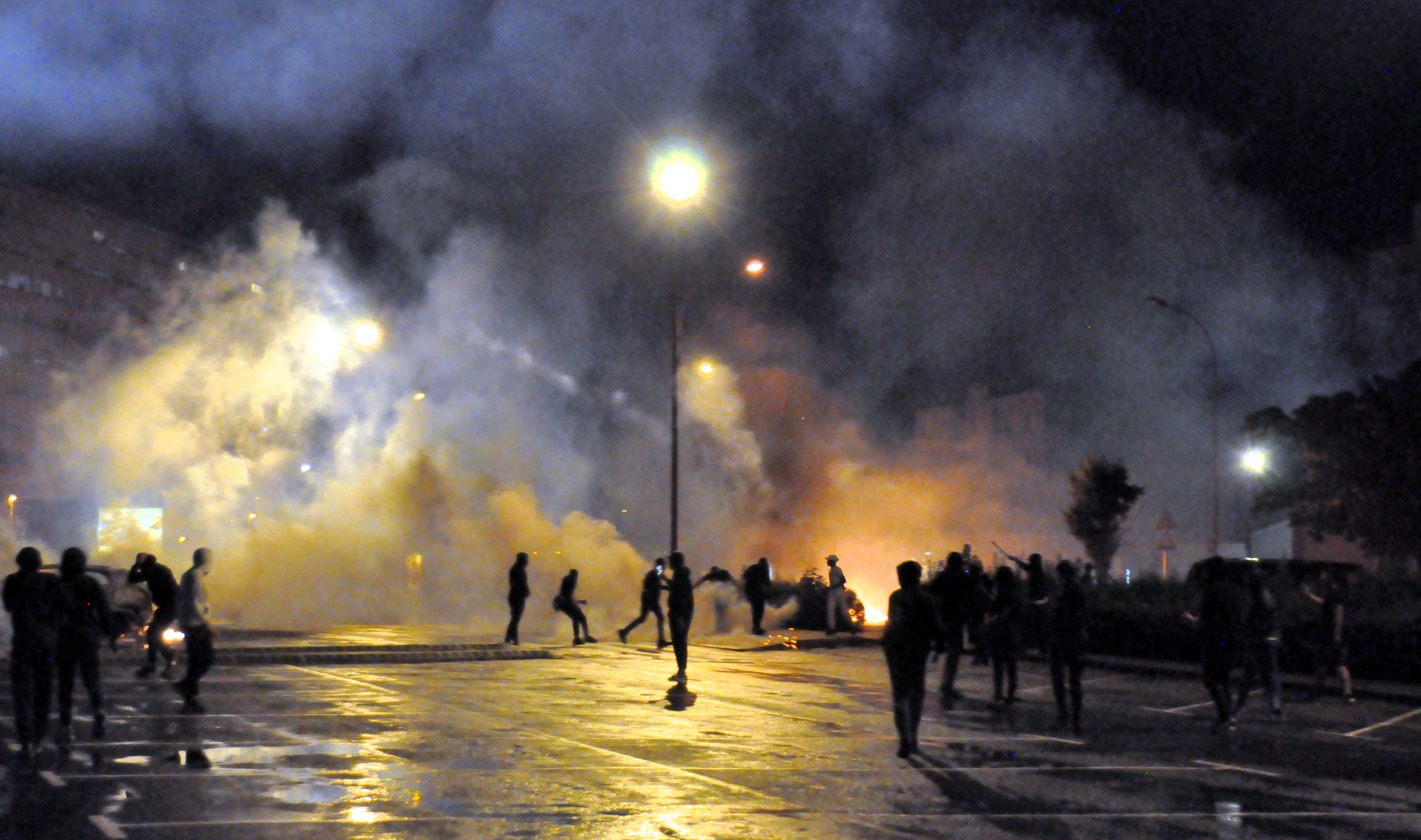
- Urban violence in Planoise (Besançon)
- Date: 27 June – 4 July 2023 (8 days)
- Location: France and other French-speaking territories
- Caused by: Killing of Nahel Merzouk
- Methods: Riots, civil disobedience, civil resistance, protests, arson, shooting, looting

Casualties, arrests, and damages
- Deaths: 2 confirmed
- Injuries: 808 officers; civil not determined
- Arrested: 3,300+
- Damage: €650 million
- Property damage: 1,000+ buildings damaged 5,662 vehicles burned

A series of riots in France began on 27 June 2023 following the fatal shooting of Nahel Merzouk in an encounter with two police officers in Nanterre, a suburb of Paris. Residents started a protest outside the police headquarters on the 27 June, which later escalated into rioting as demonstrators set cars alight, destroyed bus stops, and shot fireworks at police.

By 29 June, over 150 people had been arrested, 24 officers had been injured, and 40 cars had been torched. Fearing greater unrest, Gérald Darmanin, Interior Minister of France, deployed 1,200 riot police and gendarmes in and around Paris, later adding an additional 2,000. On 29 June, Darmanin announced that the government would deploy 40,000 officers nationwide, including RAID and GIGN counter-terrorist units, to quell the violence. After 4 July, the unrest dropped drastically and was soon declared over.

== Background ==
=== Killing of Nahel Merzouk ===
On 27 June 2023, at approximately 7:55 a.m. CEST, two Paris Police Prefecture officers spotted a Mercedes-AMG with a Polish registration plate speeding along a bus lane on Boulevard Jacques-Germain-Soufflot in Hauts-de-Seine, Île-de-France heading towards the Nanterre-Université rail station. The officers stopped the driver, Nahel Merzouk, who attempted to drive away; one officer fired at him at 8:16. The two passengers in the vehicle fled at 8:19. Merzouk was pronounced dead at 9:15 a.m.

On 29 June, his family filed a complaint for murder and false reporting, requesting that the case be moved away from Nanterre.

=== 2017 law concerning traffic stops ===
After police strikes following the burning of two police officers on 8 October 2016 in Viry-Châtillon, the law limiting police use of firearms strictly to cases of self-defense (like any other citizen) was revised in 2017 concerning refus d'obtempérer (refusals to submit to traffic stops). The revised law permits police to shoot at a vehicle fleeing a traffic stop if the vehicle is putting its passengers or passersby in danger. This law resulted in thirteen deaths in 2022, six more than the year before.

Another teenager, Alhoussein Camara, was shot dead on his way to work two weeks prior to the Merzouk shooting, also for refusing to comply with a traffic stop. The only witnesses were police, and no film of the shooting has surfaced. It was reported that the police union Alliance described him as a delinquent, though Camara did not have a criminal record.

=== Civil unrest related to policing ===
The 2005 French riots were in reaction to the death of two Muslim teenagers, electrocuted while hiding from police in an electrical substation. Then-prime minister Dominique de Villepin and his Interior minister Nicolas Sarkozy suggested that the boys were thieves, which did little to calm the situation. Jacques Chirac declared a state of emergency, the protests lasted three weeks, and more than 4,000 people were arrested.

In 2016, the death of Adama Traoré while he was under police custody resulted in protests. His sister, Assa Traoré, had charges filed against her by the government for organizing a memorial rally on 8 July 2023 in Paris despite a court ruling that the march could not take place in the originally planned towns north of Paris.

=== Police brutality in France ===
The yellow vests protests in 2018 and the alleged violent excesses of the BRAV-M (a motorcycle brigade used to curb looting and violent actions at the margin of the protests against the pension reform) led to increased public perceptions of police brutality. In April 2023, over 260,000 people signed an unsuccessful petition on the National Assembly website calling for the brigade to be disbanded. The police officer who killed Merzouk was a former member of this motorcycle brigade and of a specialized urban violence unit in Seine-Saint-Denis.

In 2020, widely circulated video footage of police violence perpetrated against Michel Zecler, a black music producer, for not wearing a face mask during the COVID-19 pandemic contradicted police testimony concerning the events.

=== Racial profiling and false reporting ===
Alleged use of racial profiling in traffic stops and identity checks is a recurring issue, which, according to Henri Leclerc (emeritus president of the Human Rights League), contributed to the "revolt". In 2016, the Court of Cassation found against the French state concerning racial profiling for identity checks, ruling that the practice was discriminatory. On this basis, in October 2020, a Parisian civil court awarded €58,500 to 11 plaintiffs who sued the French state for police violence, unjustified identity checks and improper arrests.

On 9 June 2023, the state was condemned for wrongfully jailing seven young men in the case of the burned police officers in Viry-Châtillon mentioned above. A suit concerning police allegedly making false reports leading to the men's initial condemnations is pending. In an op-ed in Le Monde political scientist Emmanuel Blanchard considers the number of videos that undermine police versions of events "worrying", saying that multiple court cases have been decided based on what appear to be false police reports.

=== Social problems ===
Mayors of some poor towns argued that the living conditions in poorer suburban communities were the cause of the riots. The mayor of Chanteloup-les-Vignes, Catherine Arenou, said: "What I see is that the population of 2023 is not the same as it was in 2005; it is poorer and poorer. Before, we still had a bit of upward social mobility. Now I see that the sons are not living as well as the fathers."

According to Philippe Rio, mayor of Grigny, "In 2005, we were already talking about extreme poverty. But COVID has made things even worse, and inflation has added yet another layer. ... [E]ven those who work can no longer get by. And children are witnessing ... their parents' inability to fill the fridge. They get the impression that they've been completely relegated."

== Events ==
=== Metropolitan France ===
==== 27–28 June ====
Riots were reported in the evening of 27 June after videos of Merzouk's killing in Nanterre began to circulate. The urban unrest was concentrated in Nanterre, where rioters threw projectiles at police, let off fireworks, and set cars, bus shelters, rubbish bins, and a school on fire. Fires were also lit near the tracks of the RER A. This rioting lasted until morning in Nanterre and spread to other areas in Île-de-France, but was also reported in Colmar and Roubaix. By the end of the day, there were at least 20 police officers injured, 10 police cars damaged, and 31 arrested. 2,000 police officers and gendarmes were deployed to deal with the outbreak of violence.

On 28 June, riots were reported in Amiens, Dijon, Lyon, Lille, Saint-Étienne, Clermont-Ferrand, and Strasbourg. French media reported numerous incidents around the Greater Paris region. There were reports of fireworks being directed at the Montreuil Town Hall which is located at the eastern edge of Paris. Fresnes Prison was also targeted by fireworks. In Toulouse, arson and clashes between 100 demonstrators and police in the Reynerie district resulted in 13 arrests and 20 vehicles burned. There were attacks reported on 27 national police stations (including 7 by arson), 4 gendarmerie barracks, 14 municipal police stations (including 10 by arson), 8 town halls, 6 schools, and 6 public buildings. Clashing and the burning of vehicles continued in Nanterre; police stations in Suresnes, Bois-Colombes, and Gennevilliers as well as municipal police stations in Meudon were attacked. Fires were set at media libraries, a construction machine in Clichy-sous-Bois, a school in Puteaux, and a tram in Clamart. Looting was reported in Colombes and town hall annexes were attacked in Meudon and Châtenay-Malabry. In total, more than 90 public buildings were attacked. In Paris, clashes erupted in the 18th and 19th arrondissements, while fires were set in the 15th arrondissement. Nationwide, at least 150 people were arrested, 170 police officers were injured, and 609 vehicles plus 109 buildings were damaged.

==== 29–30 June ====
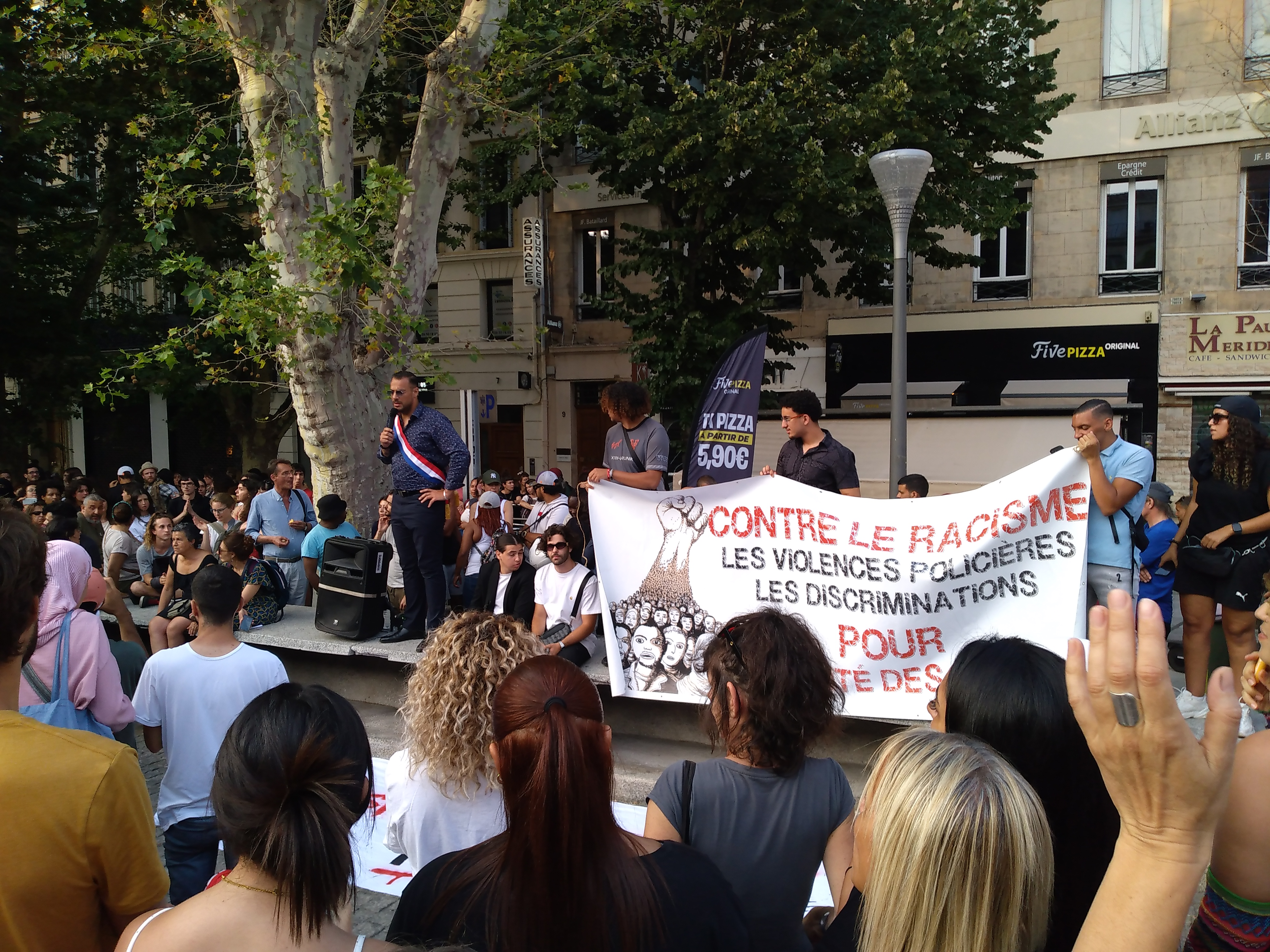
Demonstration in Marseille against police racism, the speaker wearing the tricolor sash of an elected official, 29 June 2023

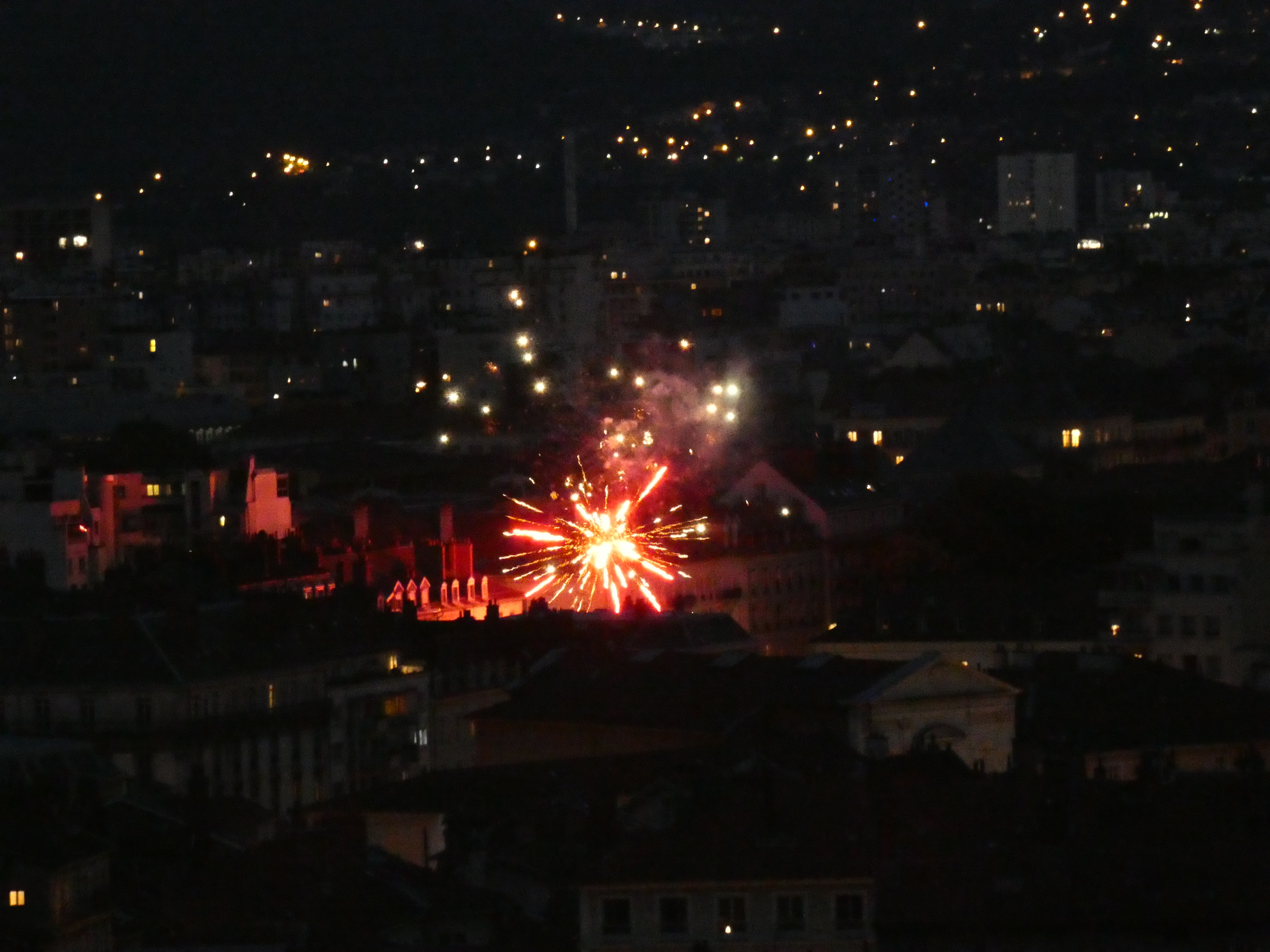
Fireworks being fired in Grenoble

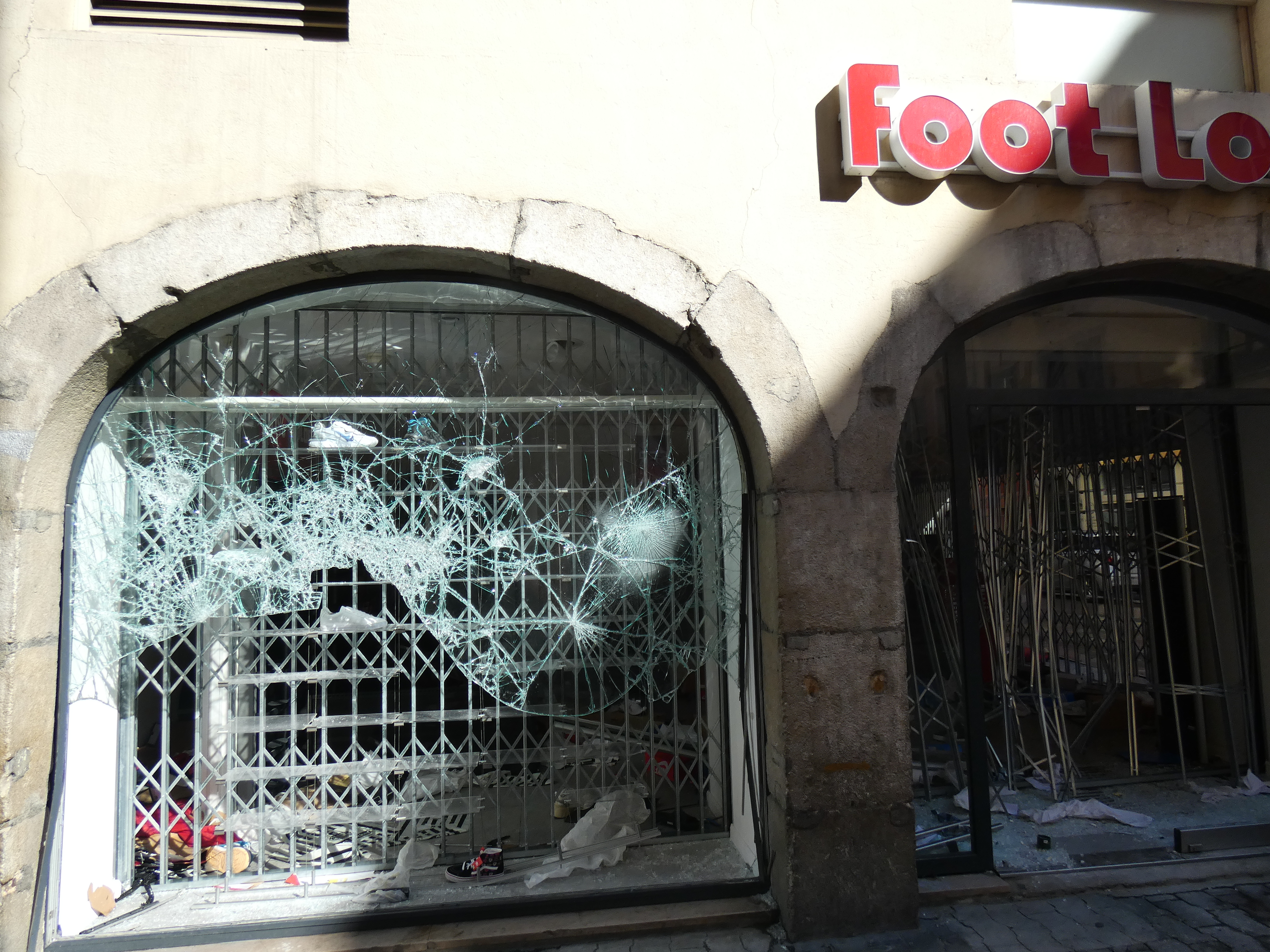
Foot Locker shoe store after being ransacked in the center of Grenoble.

On 29 June, over 6,200 people participated in a memorial march. The march started in the Picasso district of Nanterre, a particularly disadvantaged part of the city, and led to the prefecture in Nanterre. The teenager's mother led the march atop a white lorry wearing a T-shirt reading "Justice for Nahel" and the date of his death. At her side numerous well-known activists in the fight against police violence took part. By evening, tensions erupted and the BRI were sent to the scene. Buses and trams stopped running by evening to prevent damage, and several communes such as Clamart, Compiègne, and Savigny-le-Temple implemented curfews, with Savigny-le-Temple implementing a curfew only for minors.

Virgil R. (24), a former French soldier, was alone on rue de Craiova in Nanterre, about to join friends after work when he came face to face with four policemen. He was hit in the head by a flash-ball, though he said he had not taken part in any demonstration. He was rescued by two youths on a scooter and brought to a hospital. His left eye is lost.

Rioters in Marseille reportedly threw fireworks at police. In Nanterre, rioters vandalised the Memorial to the Martyrs of the Deportation, which remembers victims of the Holocaust in Vichy France. A car reportedly crashed into a supermarket in Nantes, after which it was vandalized and looted. There were also reports of the Clichy-sous-Bois town hall being lit on fire by rioters. There were 875 arrests nationally.

On 30 June, the two police unions Alliance Police nationale and the UNSA union, which represent over 50 percent of French police forces, issued a statement declaring themselves "at war", calling the protestors “vermin” and “savage hordes” and threaten politicians openly: ″Tomorrow we will be in the resistance and the government should be aware of that.″

On 30 June, Interior Minister Gérald Darmanin instructed prefectures nationwide to order that all buses and trams stop service at 9 p.m., and to prohibit the sale and transport of fireworks mortars, petrol cans, and other dangerous substances. President Emmanuel Macron canceled a scheduled trip to Germany to handle the issue, after being criticized for attending a concert during the ongoing crisis. After an unauthorized demonstration against police violence in front of the Hôtel de Ville (City Hall) in Angers had been dispersed with tear gas, the protestors were accosted by members of the banned far-right group Alvarium armed with baseball bats. The situation was quickly defused by police with only one injury requiring hospitalization. The group was involved in further conflict the following day, leading police to search their headquarters on 3 July. The rioting in Angers – which included looting of a tobacco shop, cars burned, police targeted with fireworks, and damage to the ground floor of a retirement home – led to 11 arrests according to the prefecture, including "some very young minors". In Brest, a new gym and a social center were destroyed by fire, while the city hall annex, two bank branches and a car dealership also reported damage. When the owner of an LGBT bar, informed there was talk of targeting the bar on Telegram, called police they suggested he close down quickly, which he did, for five days. In Marseille, the city's largest public library, the Bibliothèque l'Alcazar, sustained fire damage. Its glass façade was badly damaged, but rioters were unable to enter the building. Meanwhile, in Nanterre, a Holocaust memorial was defaced with anti-police slogans.

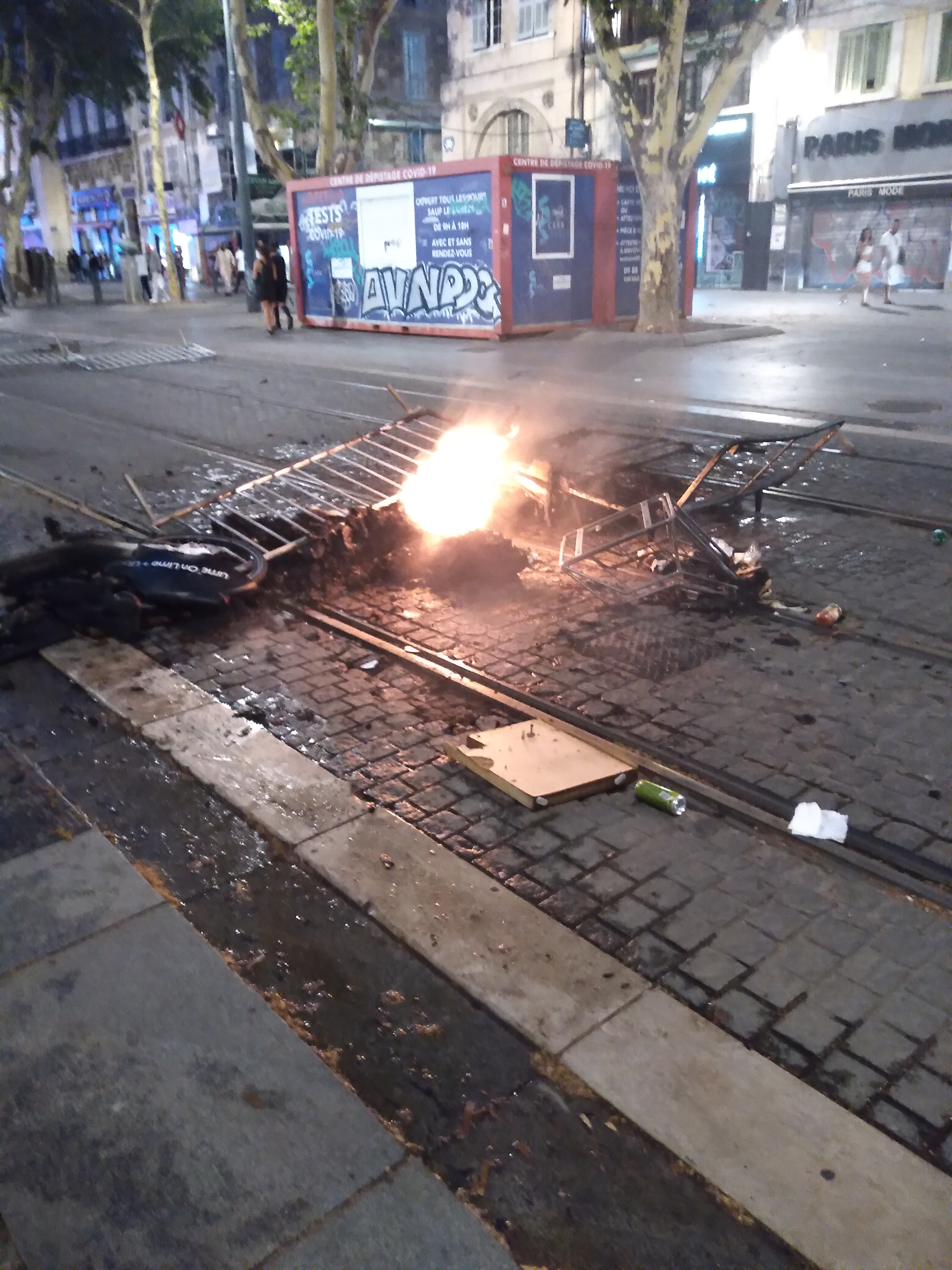
Rubbish burning in the street of Marseille, 29 June 2023

==== 1–2 July ====
On 1 July, the national police announced that a group of police officers had been targeted earlier in the morning by two individuals in Vaulx-en-Velin, the first using a pellet gun, the second using a shotgun. Four officers were injured in the attacks, one of whom requiring surgery.

In Marseille complaints were later filed against police for excessive use of violence that night. After Hedi Rouabah (21) was hit in the head by a flash-ball, four policemen from the Marseille anti-crime squad (BAC) dragged him into a dark corner, beat him up and left him for dead on the street. A video-surveillance camera captured the entire scene. Part of his skull had to be removed to save his life, and he lost his left eye.

Mohamed Bendriss (27) died of a heart attack after being hit by a flash-ball. His cousin, Abdelkarim Y. (22) had been shot in the head and lost sight in his right eye the night before. Hedi Rouabah and Abdelkarim Y. both said they were not involved in any rioting.

On 2 July, the home of the mayor of L'Haÿ-les-Roses, Vincent Jeanbrun, was attacked in the suburbs south of Paris. After the town hall had been targeted by rioters for several nights, the mayor had the building protected with barricades and barbed wire fencing and decided to spend the night there to monitor the security situation. At 1:30 a.m., attackers rammed a car into the front gate of Jeanbrun's home and attempted to set the car on fire. Fleeing the house, his wife suffered a broken leg and one of their two young children was injured. French Prime Minister Élisabeth Borne, who visited L'Haÿ-les-Roses hours later, called the attack on his family "particularly shocking". Prosecutor Stephane Hardouin confirmed that his office had opened an attempted murder investigation, while Jeanbrun called on President Macron to declare a state of emergency. In a tweet, Senate President Gérard Larcher condemned the attack, writing, "To attack the life of an elected representative and that of his family is to attack the nation."

==== 3–4 July ====
On 3 July, arrests and violent activity began to abate. A demonstration was held in support of a "return to Republican order" after the attack on the Paris suburb's mayor's home the previous day. There were still 24 buildings damaged in the Paris area and 159 cars set on fire. In Marseilles, a gun store was broken into by 30 youths, one of whom was arrested in possession of a stolen rifle. There were confirmed cases of rioters in Lyon firing Kalashnikov assault rifles in the air, as well as rioters firing shotguns at security cameras in Nîmes. Interior Minister Darmanin promised €20 million for the replacement of the 1000 videosurveillance cameras damaged during the rioting.

On 4 July, prosecutors opened an investigation into the death of Mohamed Bendriss in Marseille. They said that the likely cause of death was a violent shock to the chest from a "flash-ball" projectile, which is used by riot police.

Appearing before a Senate commission on 5 July, the Interior Minister Darmanin declared the situation had returned to calm. He also indicated that it was inaccurate to characterize the rioters as being primarily of one ethnic group, saying "there were plenty of Kevins and Mattéos" involved in the suburban violence.

==== 8 July ====
On 8 July 2023, "around 100 political parties, labor unions and associations for police reform called for demonstrations across France", specifically demanding the abrogation of the 2017 law permitting police use of firearms for refusal to stop, as well as "an in-depth reform of the police, its intervention techniques and its arsenal." Olivier Véran, the spokesperson for the government, said that the signatories of the press release titled "Our country is mourning and angry" were "adding fuel to the fire". A memorial march for Adama Traoré which had originally been planned for north of Paris was banned by the prefecture, and this decision was upheld by a court "fearful of reigniting recent unrest sparked by the police killing of 17-year-old Nahel M."

==== 10 July ====
On 10 July, French authorities banned the sale of fireworks to reduce further protests.

=== Overseas France ===
In French Guiana, riots and protests erupted in the capital city, Cayenne, beginning on 29 June, following those in Metropolitan France. Rioters set fires in several neighborhoods across the city, including the Cité Brutus, Mango, Novaparc, and Village Chinois districts. A 54-year-old government officer was killed by a stray bullet while standing on the balcony of his home in the Mont-Lucas district of Cayenne. French gendarmes based in Kourou used tear gas to disperse a crowd that set a bus on fire and attacked a supermarket in the Soula district of Macouria commune. Prefect of French Guiana Thierry Queffelec condemned the violence and announced the early shut down of Cayenne's public transportation system on 30 June, as well as a temporary ban on the sale and transportation of gasoline at night.

Elsewhere in the French Caribbean, small demonstrations took place in Guadeloupe and Martinique. Martinican demonstrators set fires to garbage receptacles and cars in Fort-de-France, Le Carbet, and Le Robert and threw objects at responding firefighters. No violence was reported in Guadeloupe.

In the overseas departments and region of Réunion, rioters vandalized buildings and cars, and reportedly threw objects at police beginning on 28 June. More than 70 fires were set across the island on the night of 1 July, which was a decrease from that of the previous evenings. Fires set by demonstrators were reported in the capital of Saint-Denis, and the communes of La Plaine-des-Palmistes, Le Port, La Possession, Le Tampon, Saint-Benoît, Saint-Louis, and Saint-Paul.

=== International ===
In Belgium, some fires were lit in Brussels on 29 June and one person was arrested for rebellion. All told, in two days a little over 100 people (including many minors) were arrested in Brussels and in Liège (where there were no incidents), most of them preemptively. In Switzerland, of the seven people arrested in Lausanne for breaking shop windows six were minors, two of whom were not Swiss citizens. In the Canadian province of Québec, a demonstration happened in Montréal in front of the Eaton Centre.

== Damage to cultural sites ==
On Friday night, June 30, a library in Metz, France, burned down, destroying 110,000 documents. The day before, in Strasbourg, a mobile cultural project was ruined, and that same night in Marseille, an attempt was made to burn down the Alcazar theater, now a library. Also, on June 30, Strasbourg's Opéra National du Rhin was damaged, causing a performance to be canceled. In a Paris suburb on June 28, rioters tried to burn a cinema. Libraries in two Lyon suburbs also faced attacks on June 28 and 29. Officials, like Metz's deputy mayor for culture, Patrick Thil, were shocked and confused by the attacks on places like libraries that serve the community. The Association of French Librarians reported that around 40 libraries had been damaged due to the riots, most of which were public and funded locally, but some private ones like the Librairie Occitane had been hit too. These incidents had happened in all types of urban areas, including cities and small towns.

== Estimated cost of the riots ==
On 4 July, the president of an employers' organization, MEDEF, estimated that the riots cost businesses around €1 billion. This estimate was based on "200 business which were thoroughly looted, 300 bank branches destroyed, 220 supermarkets that were damaged—of which 25 were burned to the ground—and nearly 1200 independent businesses that were affected". Among these were 150 looted sportswear shops and 400 damaged French lottery outlets. The total figure also included around €500 million of lost business while rebuilding and restocking shelves, and €30 million of temporary unemployment benefits. The estimate was then rounded up to the nearest billion by adding in the cost of an anticipated drop in restaurant receipts and tourism. On 11 July, the Federation of Insurers reported that the 11,800 claims received so far totaled €650 million, counting both the public and private sectors. This is three times more than the claims paid out after the three weeks of rioting in 2005, which primarily concerned burned cars. The government asked insurers to increase to 30 days the time allowed for filing and to refrain from seeking legal loopholes to avoid paying out claims.

== Reactions ==
=== Public officials and media ===
In the same speech where Macron denounced the police actions, he also called for protesters to be peaceful. Macron called upon parents to exercise influence on their children. He was critical of social media promoting videos of the urban conflict and complained of violence in video games which he said had "intoxicated" some teenagers. Macron also threatened to cut off social media in response to the protests and riots, leading to accusations of authoritarianism. The Interior Ministry urged for calm after the first day of unrest. Nanterre mayor Patrick Jarry, though expressing "shock" over the video, declared on a 28 June news conference that the prefecture had undergone "one of the worst days of its history", urging citizens to "stop this destructive spiral", and adding that "we want justice for Merzouk; we will obtain it through peaceful mobilization."

According to BBC analysis, the thirteen deaths related to refusal to submit to traffic stops in 2022, along with the amplifying effects of social media, made the memory of the unrest in 2005 a key reason why Macron and the French political establishment reacted quickly to calm matters. During his presidency, there has already been significant "anger in the streets" during the yellow vests protests and the protests resulting from reforms of the French pension system.

The United Nations Human Rights Office issued a statement on 30 June urging France to seriously address the "deep-rooted issues of racism and racial discrimination" within its law enforcement agencies, and by 2 July, the United States, Turkey, Canada, and several European countries, including the United Kingdom and Norway, had recommended caution to their citizens in France, and warned tourists to stay away from areas affected by the protests.

Left opposition leaders called for the resignation of the Interior Minister Darmanin and police chief Frédéric Veaux in a row over the police’s heavy-handed response to the riots.

=== Police violence ===
On July 12, the director of the IGPN told the law commission of the National Assembly that at least 21 investigations related to police violence "of very different nature and seriousness" had been opened.

Five police officers from the elite RAID unit were taken into custody in Marseille for questioning in the probe over the killing of Mohamed Bendriss, a man who did not even participate in the protests. Three of them were arrested on 8 August 2023.

=== Police revolt ===
In Marseille, a serious rift between police and the judiciary arose. In the Hedi Rouabah Case the judge decided to keep one of four jailed police officers from the Marseille BAC in pre-trial detention. Following the judge's decision, 400 Marseille police officers filed sick leave paperwork and a work slowdown was announced. An online fundraiser set up for the police officers' families had collected €35,000 by 22 July.

The Director General of the National Police, Frédéric Veaux supported the police revolt and said police awaiting trial do not belong in prison, and the Paris Police Prefect, Laurent Nuñez, adopted the same line, followed by all the law enforcement unions, from Alliance to UNSA. The police sick-outs and work slowdowns, initially confined to Marseille and the Bouches du Rhône department, soon spread to other parts of southern France, and to the Paris region. After a week of police revolt, with “fewer than 5%” of police officers stopping work, Minister of the Interior Darmanin received the police unions, in the company of the Paris police prefect Nuñez and the Director General of the National Police Veaux. The police demanded that their legal defense for work-related prosecutions be paid for by the State, that they be accorded a special status making pre-trial detention not possible, and that they be accorded anonymity when they are being investigated for alleged crimes. According to Le Monde, of the three demands, Darmanin only has control over the first: whether or not police officers have their legal defense paid for by the State, which he agreed to have studied.

Left opposition leaders called for the resignation of Darmanin, Veaux, and Nuñez. Former Interior Minister Bernard Cazeneuve, said he considered "separation of powers" to mean that "there can be no comments on court decisions from those who exercise responsibilities at [the Interior Ministry]" and that order without justice is an illusion. Olivier Faure called for the resignation of the triumvirate for seeking special treatment for police officers.

=== Misinformation ===
Misinformation about the protests was promoted by far-right and anti-migrant social media users to discredit the protesters, cultural minorities in France, and the country's immigration policies. Hindu nationalists also promoted misinformation targeting Muslims. Logically, a British disinformation analysis firm, found that Islamophobic narratives about the protests gained momentum in India and the United States, with several leaders and supporters of India's Bharatiya Janata Party blaming French Muslims for the violence.

Video clips falsely linked to the protests were shared on social media, including footage from The Fate of the Furious of cars falling from a building, a video of a fire at a parking lot in Australia, footage taken at a music concert in Mexico, and a 2020 clip showing a Louis Vuitton store in Portland, Oregon in the United States being looted during the George Floyd protests. A pro-Russian Twitter account shared a video of a man with a rifle on a roof, falsely claiming that the man was a sniper on Paris's rooftops.

Paul Golding, leader of the British far-right party Britain First, shared a mislabeled post of a June 2020 video of armed men from a different period of unrest. He also shared a February 2022 video of a robbery at the Merced Mall in California with the caption "Immigrant hordes loot a jewellery shop in France", which he subsequently deleted.

A fake press release supposedly from the Interior Ministry circulated on social media. It claimed that Internet access would be temporarily restricted in certain areas of the country. The French Ministry for Europe and Foreign Affairs issued a statement on Twitter saying that no such decision had been made.

== See also ==
- List of incidents of civil unrest in France
  - 1986–1987 protests in France
  - 2005 French riots
  - 2009 French riots
  - 2017 French riots
  - Yellow vests protests
