= 1986–1987 protests in France =

Protests against law relating to higher education

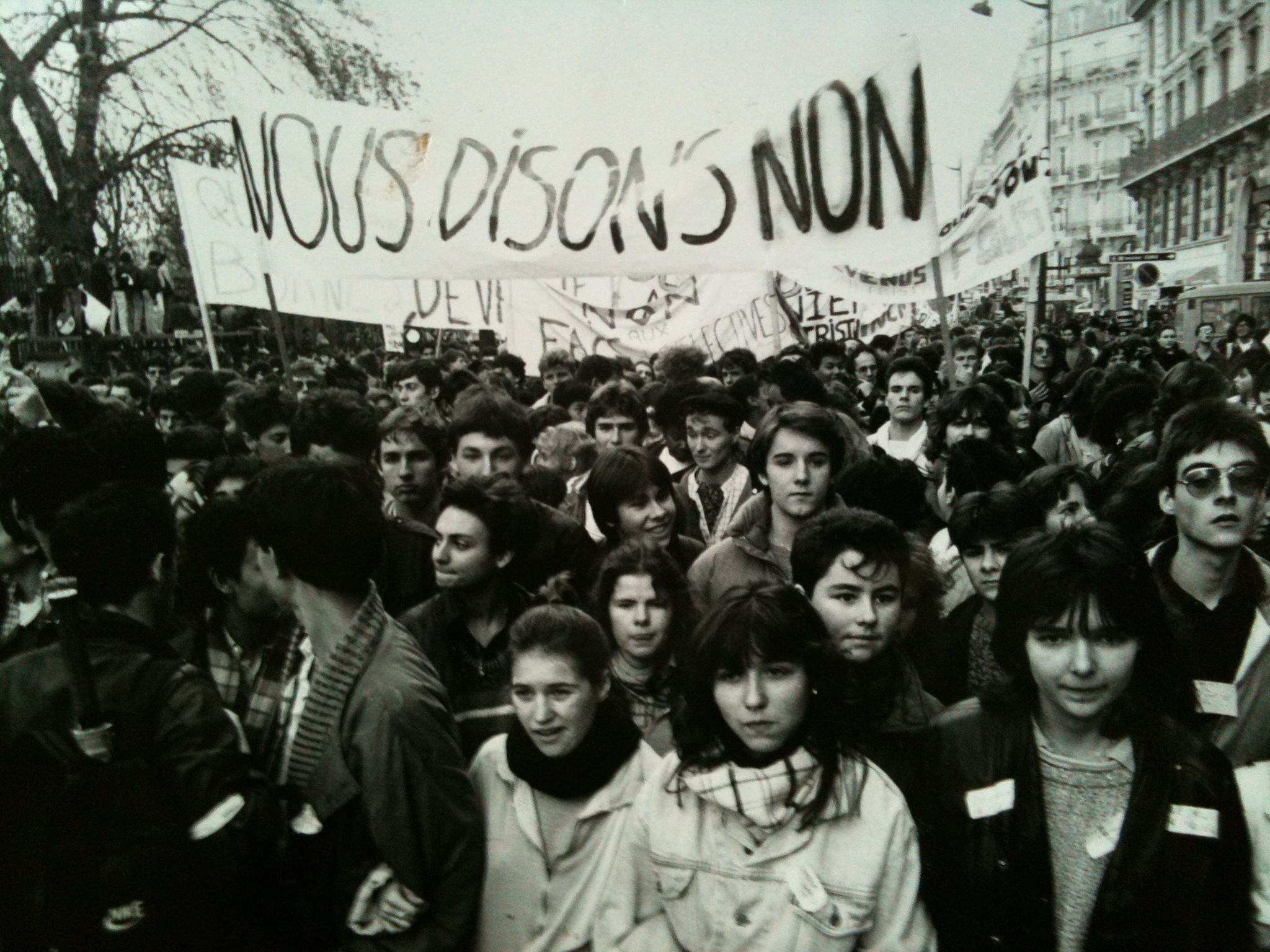
- Date: 28 November 1986 – 11 January 1987
- Location: France
- Caused by: Proposed reforms; Killing of Malik Oussekine
- Goals: Withdrawal of proposal of new bills and laws; End to police brutality; Fresh general elections
- Methods: Demonstrations, riots
- Result: Protests suppressed by force

Deaths and injuries
- Deaths: 1
- Injuries: 200

From late 1986 to early 1987, mass student protests and strikes across France erupted after the government attempted to sign the Devaquet law into law. Riots and looting occurred throughout the city of Paris but spread to 3 other cities.

== Background ==
The so-called Devaquet law was a highly controversial bill proposed by the minister of higher education Alain Devaquet. It allowed universities to charge higher admission fees and to be more selective in their students.

Another effect of the proposed law suggested that the principle that all degrees from French universities would no longer be a "national diploma". Such a diploma was equal no matter the university it was from. In this new system they would be ranked on how prestigious the university was were the degree was obtained.

== Protests ==
Mass rallies were held nationwide after a series of protests and peaceful demonstrations, led by 600,000 students and young civilians living in suburbs in Paris and surrounding towns. They protested against the death of Death of Malik Oussekine, a Franco-Algerian student who did not participate in protests and was killed in custody, and demanded the withdrawal of the Devaquet law.

Working-class strikes and Occupations occurred in 50 areas nationwide after tense protests in the central of Paris and inspired other sectors to protest. Protesters rallied on 5 December, the biggest protest movement yet. Workers and students participated in huge Marches against the law.

On 6 December, Malik Oussekine, a bystander who was not participating in the demonstrations, was killed by police. Subsequently, police brutality and police reforms became a topic of concern, and police violence against demonstrators became questionable among protesters. Protests broke out against his death.

Widespread social unrest broke out on 7 December, after the death of Malik. Protests turned into escalating tensions and student demonstrations turned violent. Riot police clashed with demonstrators marching in downtown Paris in protest at the killing. Protesters rallied again throughout early-January 1987, after a series of protests the month before. Students rioted again and reminders of the May 1968 movement was rising. After chaotic scenes during 3 weeks of nonviolent-turned violent demonstrations, the protests ended with 200 injured and one killed.

== See also ==
- 14 July 1953 demonstration
- 2005 French riots
- Nahel Merzouk riots
