= Summary and map of the 2005 French riots =

This Summary and map of the 2005 French riots is to clearly show the spread of the 2005 French riots.

== Table ==
Table showing the riots of 2005
Stage	Dates and sources	Location ville-départements	Burnt vehicles and arrests
Origins: the Zones HLM at risk	Since the 60s	Banlieue parisienne, Lyon, Marseille, Lille, Bordeaux, ...	Regular vandalisms and disturbances.
Beginning: deaths of 2 youths	evenings of 27 to 31/10/2005	Clichy-sous-Bois, then Montfermeil (Seine-Saint-Denis)	?
--To finish--	Evenings of /11/2005		
Spread to l'Ile de France	Night of 1-2/10/2005; Tuesday-Wednesday	Seine-Saint-Denis, Seine-et-Marne and Val-d’Oise.	228 (153SSD/75 elsewhere)
	Night of 2-3/10/2005; Wednesday-Thursday	location ?	315IdF, 29 arrests .
	Night of 3-4/10/2005; Thursday-Friday	Seine- Saint Denis, Seine-et-Marne, Val-d’Oise, Marseille, [and others ?]	593 (519IdF/74P), 78 arrests .
Spread to the countryside	night of 4-5/11/2005; Friday-Saturday	Seine-et-Marne, Val-d'Oise, Suresnes, Lille, Roubaix, Tourcoing, Hem, Mons-en-Barœul, Rouen, Dijon, Marseille, Strasbourg, Rennes, Nantes, Nice, and Toulouse, .	"897 (656IdF/241P)" (Yves Bot, procureur général de Paris, Radio France)
	night of 5-6/11/2005; Saturday-Sunday	ditto + ...	1295v. (741IdF/554P), 312 arrests.
English version: 2005 Paris suburb riots		Version française: Émeutes de 2005 en banlieue parisienne	

== Geographical ==
=== Areas affected in Île-de-France ===
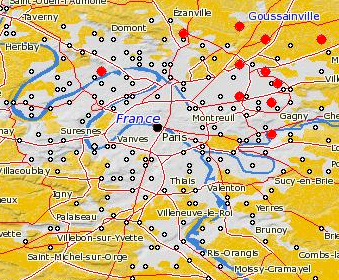
Areas affected (partial)

- Paris (3rd arrondissement)
- Seine-Saint-Denis: Aubervilliers, Épinay-sur-Seine, Pierrefitte-sur-Seine
- Yvelines: Achères, Les Mureaux
- Seine-et-Marne: Meaux, Torcy
- Val-de-Marne: Champigny, Ormesson-sur-Marne
- Essonne: Corbeil-Essonnes, Saint-Michel-sur-Orge, Brétigny-sur-Orge
- Hauts-de-Seine: Suresnes, Clamart
- Val-d'Oise: Villiers-le-Bel

=== Other French areas affected ===
Spread of rioting and vehicular vandalism (chronological animation 3 Nov. - 5 Nov.)

- Aisne: Soissons
- Alpes-Maritimes: Drap, Nice, Saint-André, Cannes
- Bas-Rhin: Strasbourg
- Côte d'Or: Dijon
- Doubs: Montbéliard
- Eure: Évreux
- Finistère: Brest, Quimper
- Gironde: Bègles, Blanquefort, Bordeaux, Lormont
- Haute-Garonne: Toulouse
- Haute-Marne: Saint-Dizier
- Haute-Normandie: Rouen
- Hautes-Pyrénées: Tarbes
- Haut-Rhin: Colmar, Illzach, Mulhouse
- Ille-et-Vilaine: Saint-Malo, Rennes
- Loir-et-Cher: Blois
- Loire-Atlantique: Nantes
- Loiret: Montargis, Orléans
- Mayenne: Laval
- Meurthe-et-Moselle: Nancy
- Moselle: Metz, Rombas, Thionville
- Nord: Dunkerque, Hem, Lille (Lille-Sud neighborhood), Mons-en-Baroeul, Roubaix, Tourcoing, Valenciennes, Wattrelos
- Oise: Beauvais, Méru, Nogent-sur-Oise, Creil
- Pas-de-Calais: Calais, Arras
- Puy-de-Dôme: Clermont-Ferrand
- Pyrénées-Atlantiques: Pau
- Rhône : Lyon, Rillieux-la-Pape
- Sarthe: Le Mans
- Saône-et-Loire: Montceau-les-Mines, Chalon-sur-Saône
- Seine Maritime: Le Havre, Rouen
- Somme: Amiens
- Tarn-et-Garonne: Montauban
- Territoire de Belfort: Belfort
- Vaucluse: Avignon

== Number of arrests and arson cases ==
date	vehicles burned	arrests	extent of riots	sources
1. 28 October			Clichy-sous-Bois
2. 29 October	29	14	Clichy-sous-Bois
3. 30 October	30	19	Clichy-sous-Bois
4. 31 October			Clichy-sous-Bois, Montfermeil
5. 1 November			Seine-Saint-Denis
6. 2 November	40		Seine-Saint-Denis, Seine-et-Marne Val-d’Oise, Hauts-de-Seine
7. 3 November	315	29	Île-de-France, Dijon, Rouen, Bouches-du-Rhône
8. 4 November	596	78	Île-de-France, Dijon, Rouen, Marseille
9. 5 November	897	253	Île-de-France, Rouen, Dijon, Marseille, Évreux, Roubaix, Tourcoing, Hem, Strasbourg, Rennes, Nantes, Nice, Toulouse, Bordeaux, Pau, Strasbourg, Rennes, Toulouse, Lille
10. 6 November	1,295	193
11. 7 November	1,408	395
TOTAL	4,551	948
