= Hôtel de Ville, Angers =

Town hall in Angers, France

Hôtel de Ville
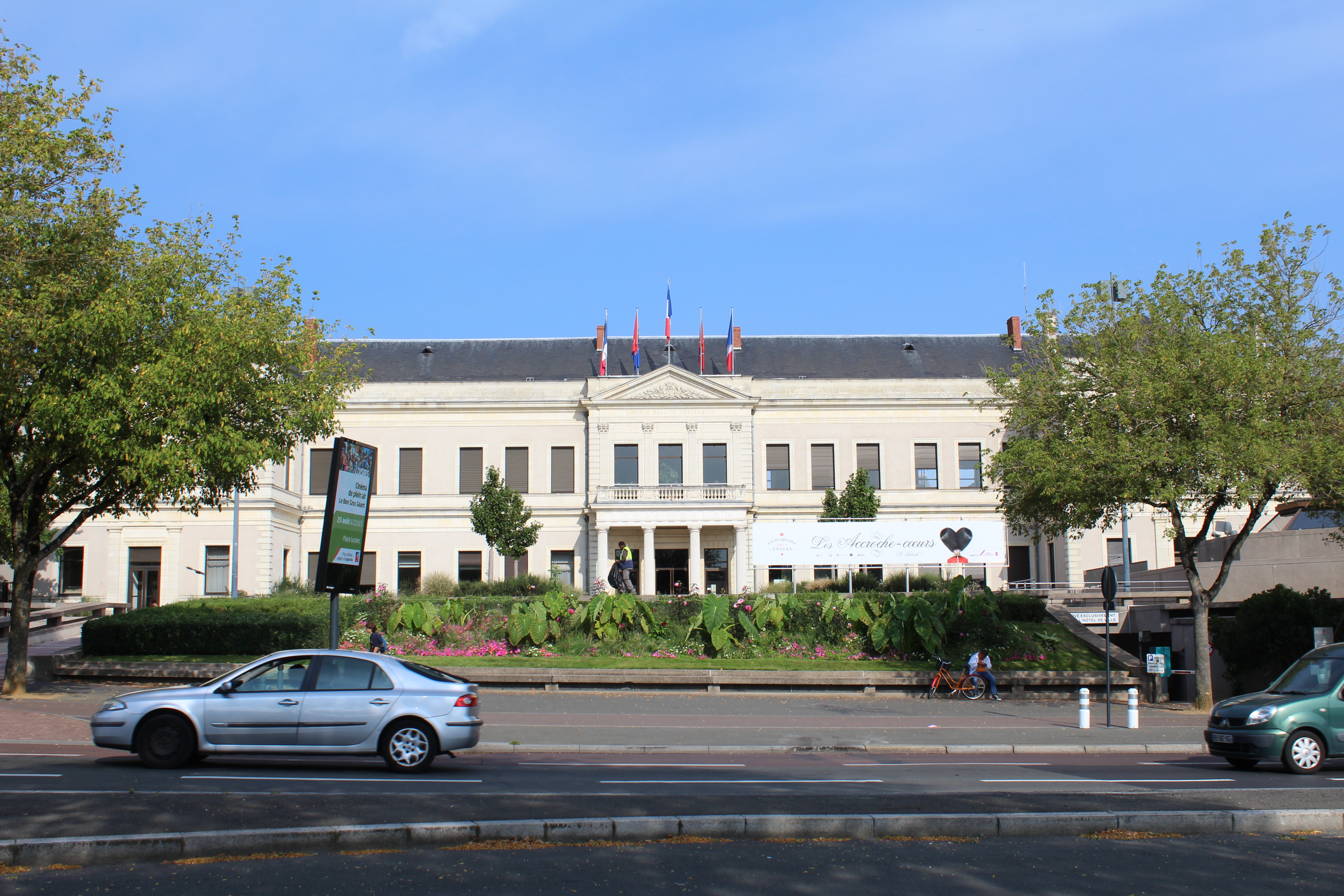
- The main frontage of the Hôtel de Ville in August 2017
- Interactive map of the Hôtel de Ville area

General information
- Type: City hall
- Architectural style: Neoclassical style
- Location: Angers, France
- Coordinates: 47.4711°N 0.5482°W
- Completed: 1823

Design and construction
- Architect: Adolphe Lenoir

The Hôtel de Ville (French pronunciation: [otɛl də vil], City Hall) is a municipal building in Angers, Maine-et-Loire, west France, standing on the Boulevard Résistance et Déportation. It has been included on the Inventaire général des monuments by the French Ministry of Culture since 1981.

== History ==
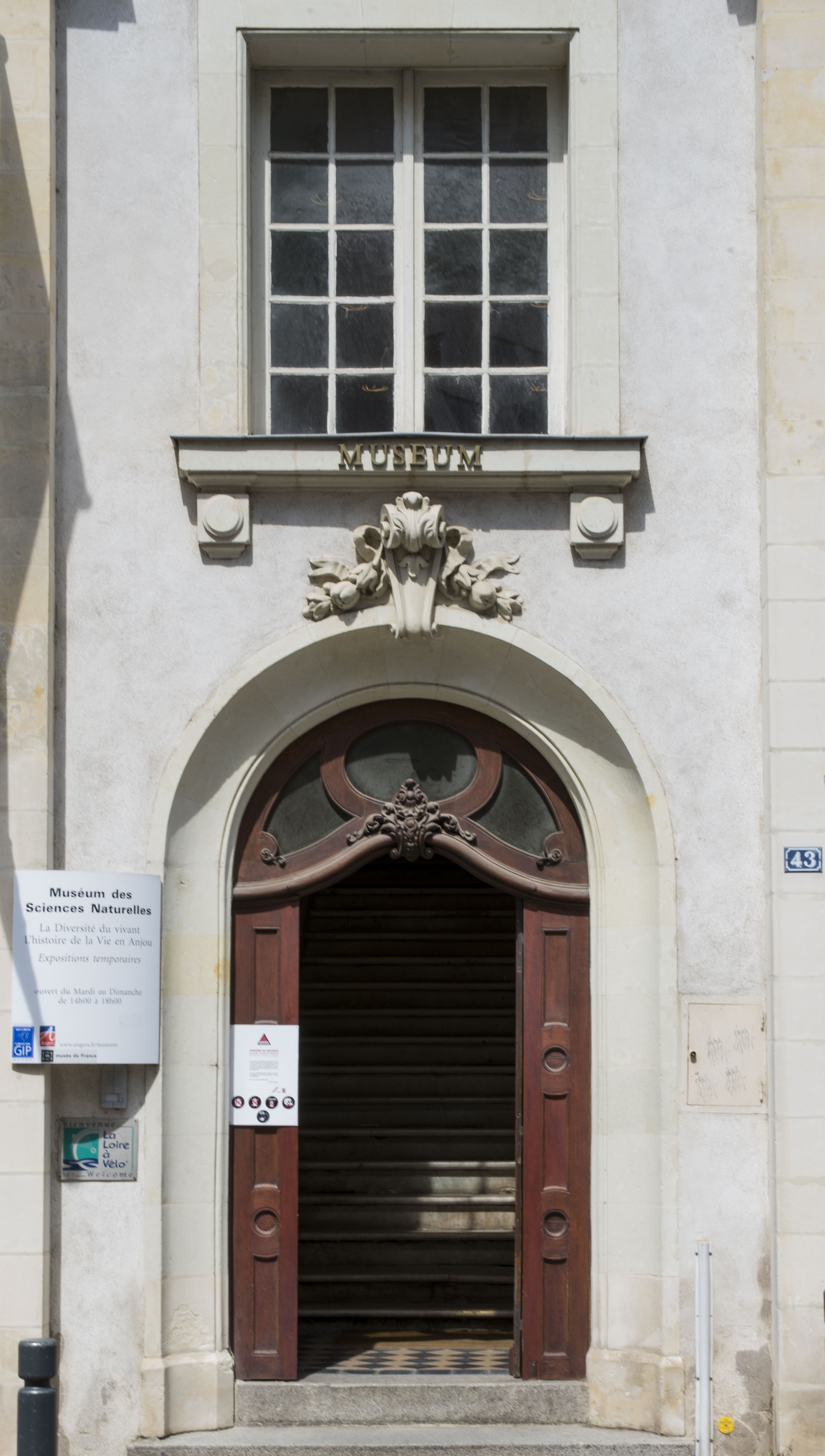
The entrance to the former Grande Maison des Halles

Early meetings of the local council were held in a room in the Porte Chapellière on Rue Baudrière. This was one of the great gates of the city and dated back to the 10th century. In the mid-15th century, the council sought a dedicated building and selected the Hôtel de la Godeline, which they refurbished and rented from the Bishop of Nantes from 1484.

After, the bishop demanded his property back in 1514, the council, led by the mayor, Jean Cadu, decided to commission a new town hall. The site they selected was in the Places des Halles (now Place Louis-Imbach). The building, which became known as the Grande Maison des Halles, was designed in the Renaissance style and completed in 1531. A fine landscaped garden was laid out in front of the building and featured a bust of Louis XIV from 1686. The house remained the local seat of government for three centuries until the council decided, in the early 19th century, that it had become too cramped. Meanwhile, the Grande Maison des Halles was repurposed as a courthouse in the 1820s and, since 1885, has been occupied by the Muséum d'histoire naturelle d'Angers.

The council then had to find alternative accommodation. The site it selected was occupied by the Collège des Oratoriens, which was re-built in the late 17th century but had closed in 1793. The building was remodelled in the neoclassical style to a design by Adolphe Lenoir, and was officially opened by Marie-Thérèse, Duchess of Angoulême as the new town hall on 23 September 1823.

The design involved a symmetrical main frontage of 21 bays facing onto the Boulevard Résistance et Déportation, with the end sections of three bays each projected forward as pavilions. The central section of three bays, which was slightly projected forward, featured a tetrastyle portico formed by Doric order columns supporting an entablature with triglyphs, a cornice and a balcony with a balustrade. There were three French doors on the first floor flanked by Corinthian order pilasters supporting an entablature and a modillioned pediment with carvings in the tympanum. The wings and end sections were fenestrated by casement windows on both floors.

The building was also used for public events: on 27 December 1845, the pianist, Franz Liszt, performed a recital there, at a time when Lisztomania was at its height. Following the liberation of Angers by American troops on 10 August 1944, during the Second World War, the mayor, Victor Bernier, proclaimed freedom from the balcony of the town hall.

A major extension to the north was completed to a design by Philippe Mornet in 1980. A new Salle du Conseil (council chamber) was created, shaped in the form of an octagon, which formed a link between the original building and the extension.
