= 2017 French riots =

Unrest in France following police brutality

- Part of Social situation in the French suburbs
- Date: First phase: 4–15 February 2017 (12 days) Second phase: 27–28 March 2017 (2 days)
- Location: France, primarily in Paris and Seine-Saint-Denis
- Caused by: Rape of black man by police (February); Fatal shooting of a Chinese man by police (March)
- Methods: Protesting, rioting, rock throwing, arson, mobbing

Parties
France: French National Police	African and Maghrebi youth (February); Chinese French youth (March)

Casualties
- Injuries: Unknown (February); 3 (March)
- Arrested: ~254 (February); 35 (March)

The 2017 French riots refer to two separate unrelated incidents of unrest in France following claimed abuse of power by police. The first of these riots began on 4 February 2017, in suburbs of Paris, following the alleged rape of a black man named Théo L. by police with a baton. These protests continued until 15 February. The second set of riots began late March when a Chinese man was fatally shot by police officers in Paris. These riots ended the next day.

== February riots ==
=== Théo affair ===
On 2 February 2017, four police officers approached a group of young people at 4:53 PM in the Rose-des-Vents neighborhood of Aulnay-sous-Bois (Seine-Saint-Denis), a Paris suburb.

According to 22-year-old Théodore Luhaka (aka Théo), a local educator, he went with a friend of his sister and had just visited friends in the neighborhood. He said police approached him and ordered him to stand against a wall to be frisked. He said that one of the men the police accosted asked why he was being threatened with a fine of 450 Euros, and one of the policemen responded with a "big slap". Theo L. says he then defended the victim of the slap, and was beaten and insulted as he struggled back.

The police account of the incident differs. They said the man had intervened violently against an officer arresting a drug dealer, who could, as a result, have run away. According to this account, the young man was restrained after, among other things, punching the policeman in the face.

The operating account by the IGPN videos are temporally consistent with the officer's testimony, but the IGPN fails to settle the question of who started the altercation.

Luhaka was restrained by three police officers and a fourth showered the group from a distance with tear gas. Following the incident, Luhaka suffered from a longitudinal 10 cm wound to his anal canal and sphincter muscle, probably caused by the insertion of a telescopic stick, which resulted in a temporary disability (ITT) of sixty days.

Luhaka said also he was the object of racist insults (including the word "bamboula"), suffered new blows in the police car, and claims to have been photographed in a humiliating position by policemen using Snapchat.

At the hearing for the policeman indicted for rape, the police stated that they only hit Théo's legs and they have no idea how Luhaka was injured. The use of tear gas (forbidden in these circumstances, according to Le Dauphiné Libéré) was, according to police, accidental.

=== Investigation ===
The prosecutor of Bobigny opened a criminal investigation for "violences volontaires en réunion par personnes dépositaires de l'autorité publique"(willful violence in a group by persons vested with public authority).

The Inspection générale de la Police nationale (IGPN) favored the account that the injury to the anal canal was nonintentional, however, the judge in charge of the case placed under examination the policeman who had used his telescopic baton, and placed the other three under examination for aggravated intentional violence. The four officers were placed under judicial review, and three were banned from official police activity. Minister of the Interior Bruno Le Roux also suspended the four policemen immediately as a precautionary measure. Three of the officers involved in the arrest were charged with aggravated assault and the fourth was placed under investigation for rape.

On 14 February 2017, L'Obs published the testimony of Mohamed K. who says he had been a victim of violence of the same officer who is the primary accused in the Théo case, a week earlier — a policeman nicknamed "Red Beard". He said he received numerous blows from this policeman and his colleagues, and had also been the object of racist insults.

The IGPN was also seized for this case at the request of the police headquarters and the Interior Minister, Bruno Le Roux. Éric Dupond-Moretti, already a lawyer in the Théo case, was appointed to represent Mohamed K as well.

Three of the officers - Marc-Antoine Castelain, Jeremie Dulin, and Tony Hochart - were ultimately charged with voluntary violence resulting in permanent disability. A trial on these charges took place in January 2024 and ended with the three defendants being found guilty of voluntary violence not resulting in permanent disability, the court holding that Luhaka's injuries were not debilitating enough to be considered a permanent injury. All three officers received suspended prison sentences.

==== Previous offenses ====
French daily L'Humanité has reported that the Police Commissioner of Aulnay-sous-Bois in 2008 was sentenced to one-year suspended sentence and one year disqualification for not preventing a crime. A police officer had placed a trim between the buttocks of a person who had committed a road offense, who then had accused the police of having "threatened to sodomise." The commissioner, who had arrived at the scene, had remained passive in the face to the actions of his subordinates.

=== Aftermath ===
Following the initial reports of the assault on Théo, there was unrest for two nights in Aulnay-sous-Bois. Several cars were set on fire, bus shelters had windows smashed and suburb had its street lighting knocked out. Five people were arrested. The unrest later spread to other suburbs of Paris. On Saturday 11 February, a crowd of people gathered to protest police brutality in Bobigny. While the protest was mostly peaceful, a small group of protestors began throwing objects at police and setting cars on fire. Police responded by deploying tear gas and arresting 37 people. The next night, 12 February, around 50 youths gathered in Argenteuil and began throwing objects at police. They also set cars and garbage bins on fire and attacked a public bus. The group assault the bus's driver and also assaulted a journalist. 11 people, eight of them minors, were arrested. A group of South Korean tourists were mugged on a coach bus by rioters in Paris.

More clashes occurred in Paris on 15 February, with police deploying tear gas. On the night of the 15th, 49 people were arrested around Paris after engaging in similar behaviors with most of the unrest occurring near the Gare du Nord and Place de la République. 21 people were also arrested in Rouen the same night.

=== Reactions ===
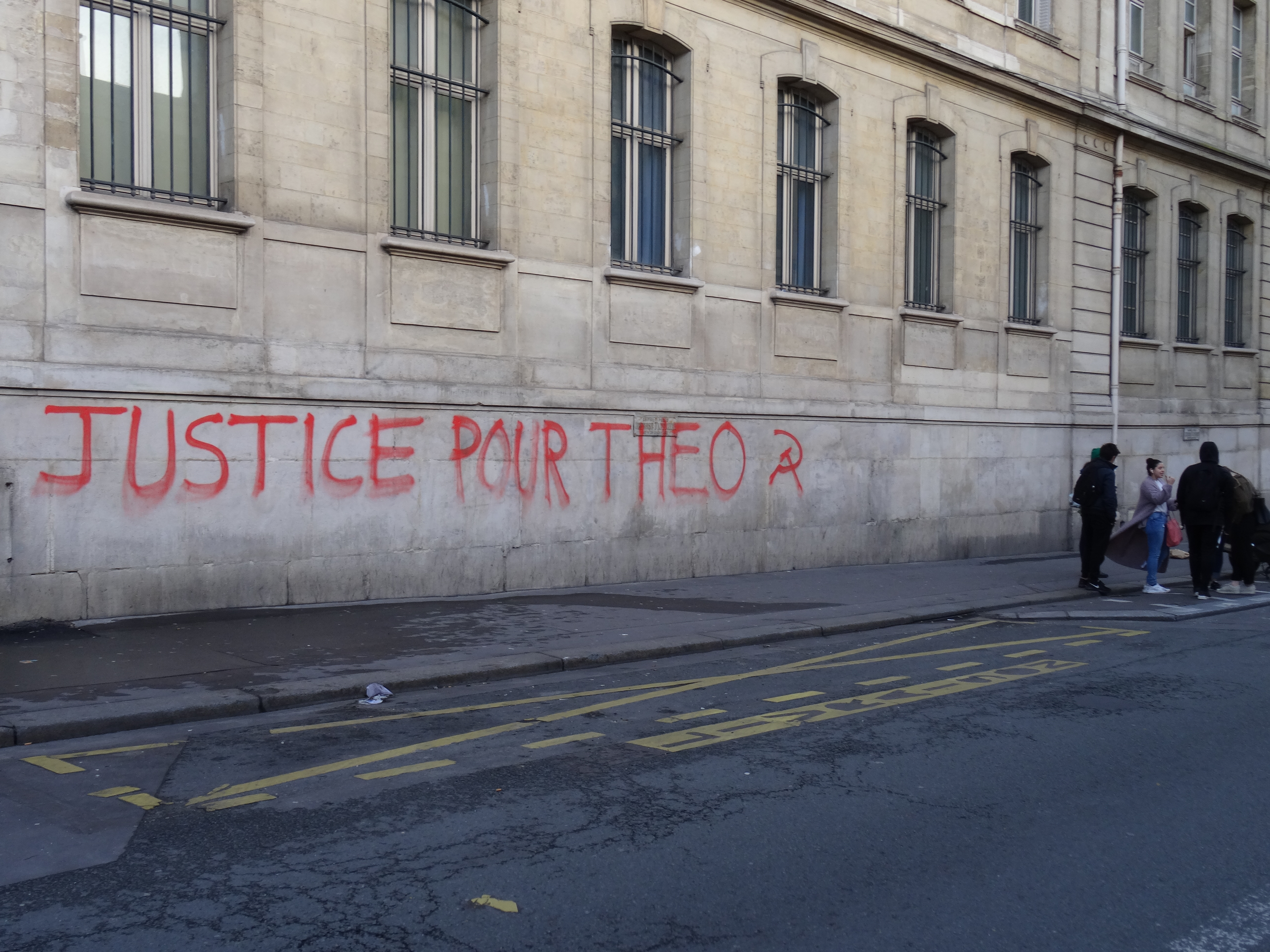
Graffiti in support of Luhaka in the 10th arrondissement, February 2017

French president François Hollande visited Théo in the hospital on 7 February. A policeman told Le Parisien that events were similar to the 2005 French riots. Prime Minister Bernard Cazeneuve, called for better law enforcement on 7 February 2017, saying "I know how exposed the police and gendarmes are in the fight against terrorism and violence, but they must be absolutely exemplary at every moment." An SGP Police Unit union official said on C dans l'air, 9 February, that "The insult is more or less appropriate." Minister of the Interior Bruno Le Roux, condemned these comments, as did the group SOS Racisme.

Théo also received public support of actor and comedian Omar Sy, rapper Youssoupha, from Valérie Damidot, singer Imany, the director and actor Mathieu Kassovitz. On 15 February, dozens of artists published a message of support for Theo L. in Libération, written by a councilor of Brétigny-sur-Orge, Steevy Gustave, a former event manager for SOS Racisme, making some suggestions in order to improve the performance of law enforcement. The supporters included Patrick Bruel, Hugues Aufray, the comedians Josiane Balasko, Jean Benguigui and Mathilda May, director Nils Tavernier, the Avignon festival director Olivier Py and comedian Anne Roumanoff. Other media in this case made a more general denunciation of certain police methods.

In contrast to the many condemnations of police, lawyer Gilles-William Goldnadel viewed the case as "anti-cop hate." He said that the possible misconduct of some police officers "can not put blame upon the entire French police force, who are widely exemplary" and that to "generalize to the entire profession for the possible crime of one or a few is consubstantial racism." Front National presidential candidate Marine Le Pen similarly announced support for police and criticized the French government for not cracking down on rioters harder.

== March riots ==
More anti-police riots occurred in Paris on 27 March after the fatal shooting of a Chinese man.

=== Shooting ===
On 26 March, a 56-year-old Chinese man named Liu Shaoyao (simplified Chinese: 刘少尧; traditional Chinese: 刘少堯; pinyin: liú shǎoyáo,) was shot to death by police at his home in the 19th arrondissement of Paris after police received a call about a domestic dispute. Police claimed that Liu immediately charged them with a pair of scissors after they opened the door to his house and shot him dead. Liu's family, who were in the home at the time of the shooting, disputed the story.

=== Aftermath ===
The day after the shooting, around 150 protesters gathered around the arrondissement police station and threw objects at police and burned a police car. 35 people were arrested and three officers were injured. On 28 March, more protests occurred, but they were not as violent as those of the previous day.

=== Reactions ===
Following the shooting of Liu, the Chinese government called on France to protect Chinese nationals residing in France.

== See also ==
- Banlieue
- Yellow vests movement
