= 2005 French riots =

2005 civil unrest in France

- Part of the French banlieue riots
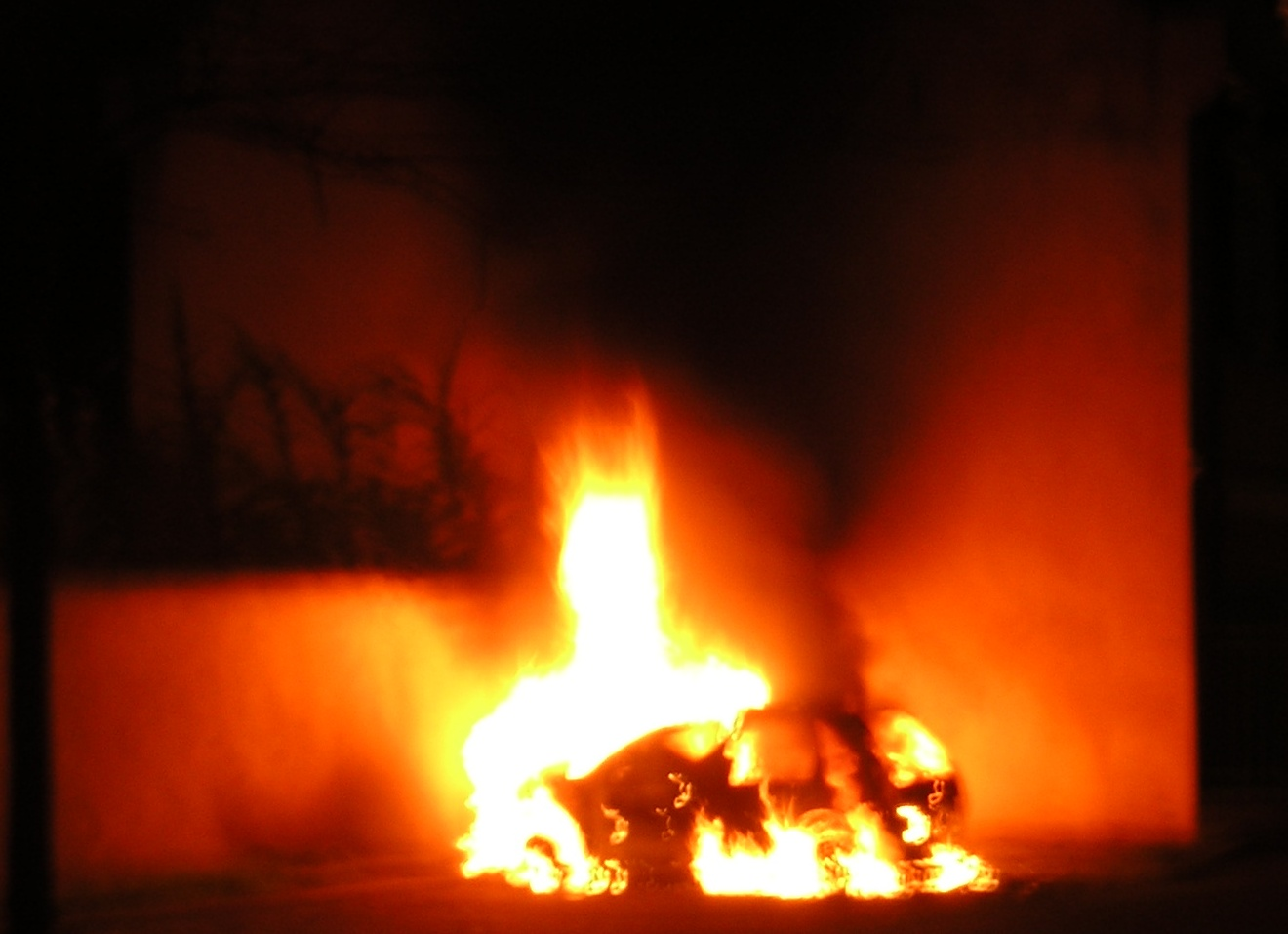
- A car in Strasbourg lit during the riots.
- Date: 27 October – 16 November 2005 (21 days)
- Location: Various cities and towns in France; 47°N 2°E
- Caused by: Deaths of Zyed Benna and Bouna Traoré
- Methods: Arson, rioting
- Result: State of emergency declared on 8 November, rioting slows down by mid-November

Parties
Various groups, largely African and Arab immigrants	Government of France: Ministry of the Interior; Police nationale; Compagnies Républicaines de Sécurité

Lead figures
Non-centralized leadership	Jacques Chirac (President); Dominique de Villepin (Prime Minister); Nicolas Sarkozy (Minister of the Interior)

Number
25,000 rioters	11,000 police officers

Casualties and losses
2,888 arrested Unknown injured	126 police officers and firemen injured 2 civilians killed by rioters 1 civilian killed by smoke inhalation

Casualties
- Deaths: 2
- Injuries: Unknown
- Arrested: 2,888

The 2005 French riots was a three-week long period of civil disturbances that took place in the suburbs of Paris and other French cities in October and November 2005. These riots involved youth in violent attacks, outbreaks of arson of vehicles and public buildings.

The unrest started on 27 October at Clichy-sous-Bois, where police were investigating a reported break-in at a building site, and a group of local youths scattered in order to avoid interrogation. Three of them hid in an electrical substation where two died from electrocution, resulting in a power blackout (It was not established whether police had suspected these individuals or a different group, wanted on separate charges.). The incident ignited rising tensions about youth unemployment and police harassment in the poorer housing estates, and there followed three weeks of rioting throughout France. A state of emergency was declared on 8 November, later extended for three months.

The riots resulted in more than 8,000 vehicles being burned by the rioters and more than 2,760 individuals arrested.

== Triggering event ==
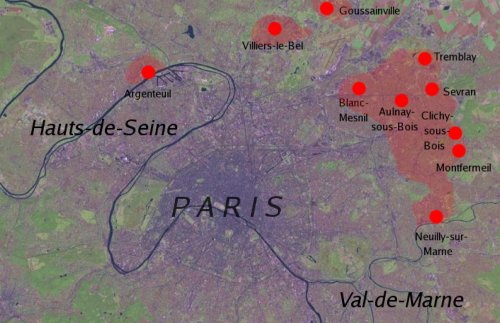
Areas of Rioting in the Paris region as of 1 November

Citing two police investigations, The New York Times reported that the incident began at 17:20 on Thursday, 27 October 2005 in Clichy-sous-Bois when police were called to a construction site to investigate a possible break-in. Three teenagers, chased by the police, climbed a wall to hide in a power substation. Six youths were detained by 17:50. During questioning at the police station in Livry-Gargan at 18:12, blackouts occurred at the station and in nearby areas. The police said that these were caused by the electrocution of two boys, Zyed Benna and Bouna Traoré; a third boy, Muhittin Altun, suffered electric shock injury from the power substation in which they were hiding. The New York Times wrote:

According to statements by Mr. Altun, who remains hospitalized with injuries, a group of ten or so friends had been playing football on a nearby field and were returning home when they saw the police patrol. They all fled in different directions to avoid the lengthy questioning that youths in the housing projects say they often face from the police. They say they are required to present identity papers and can be held as long as four hours at the police station, and sometimes their parents must come before the police will release them.

There is controversy over whether the teens were actually being chased. The local prosecutor, François Molins, said that although they believed so, the police were actually after other suspects attempting to avoid an identity check.

This event ignited pre-existing tensions. Protesters told The Associated Press the unrest was an expression of frustration with high unemployment and police harassment and brutality. "People are joining together to say we've had enough", said one protester. "We live in ghettos. Everyone lives in fear." The rioters' suburbs are also home to a large, mostly North African and Sub-Saharan African, immigrant population, allegedly adding religious tensions, which some commentators believed contribute further to such frustrations and the discrimination against Muslims following the September 11 attacks and the subsequent war in Iraq. According to Pascal Mailhos, head of the Renseignements Généraux (French intelligence agency) radical Islamism or Islamic terrorism had no influence over the 2005 civil unrest in France.

== Timeline ==
While tension had been building among the juvenile population in France, action was not taken until the reopening of schools in autumn, since most of the French population is on holiday during the summer months. However, on 27 October 2005, in Clichy-sous-Bois, late in the afternoon, about ten residents came back on foot from the stadium, where they spent the afternoon playing football. Along the way, they walked near a big building site. A local resident reported an attempted robbery near the construction site to police which then sent a car. The national police tried to arrest six French youths of African or North African origin: four in the Vincent Auriol park and two others in the cemetery which adjoins the electrical substation EDF (Electricité de France) where three others who escaped took refuge – Bouna Traoré (15 years), Zyed Benna (17 years), and Muhittin Altun (17 years). Trying to hide in the electrical substation, Bouna Traoré and Zyed Benna died by electrocution. The third, Muhittin Altun, was seriously burned, but recovered and returned to the district. Shortly after this incident, riots began. Initially confined to the Paris area, the unrest subsequently spread to other areas of the Île-de-France région, and spread through the outskirts of France's urban areas, also affecting some rural areas. After 3 November it spread to other cities in France, affecting all 15 of the large aires urbaines in the country. Thousands of vehicles were burned, and at least one person was killed by the rioters. Close to 2900 rioters were arrested.

On 8 November, President Jacques Chirac declared a state of emergency, effective at midnight. Despite the new regulations, riots continued, though on a reduced scale, the following two nights, and again worsened the third night. On 9 November and the morning of 10 November a school was burned in Belfort, and there was violence in Toulouse, Lille, Strasbourg, Marseille, and Lyon.

On 10 November and the morning of 11 November, violence increased overnight in the Paris region, and there were still a number of police wounded across the country. According to the Interior Minister, violence, arson, and attacks on police worsened on the 11th and morning of the 12th, and there were further attacks on electricity substations, causing a blackout in the northern part of Amiens.

Rioting took place in the city center of Lyon on Saturday, 12 November, as young people attacked cars and threw rocks at riot police who responded with tear gas. Also that night, a nursery school was torched in the southern town of Carpentras.

On the night of the 14th and the morning of the 15th, 215 vehicles were burned across France and 71 people were arrested. Thirteen vehicles were torched in central Paris, compared to only one the night before. In the suburbs of Paris, firebombs were thrown at the treasury in Bobigny and at an electrical transformer in Clichy-sous-Bois, the neighborhood where the disturbances started. A daycare centre in Cambrai and a tourist agency in Fontenay-sous-Bois were also attacked. Eighteen buses were damaged by arson at a depot in Saint-Étienne. The mosque in Saint-Chamond was hit by three firebombs, which did little damage.

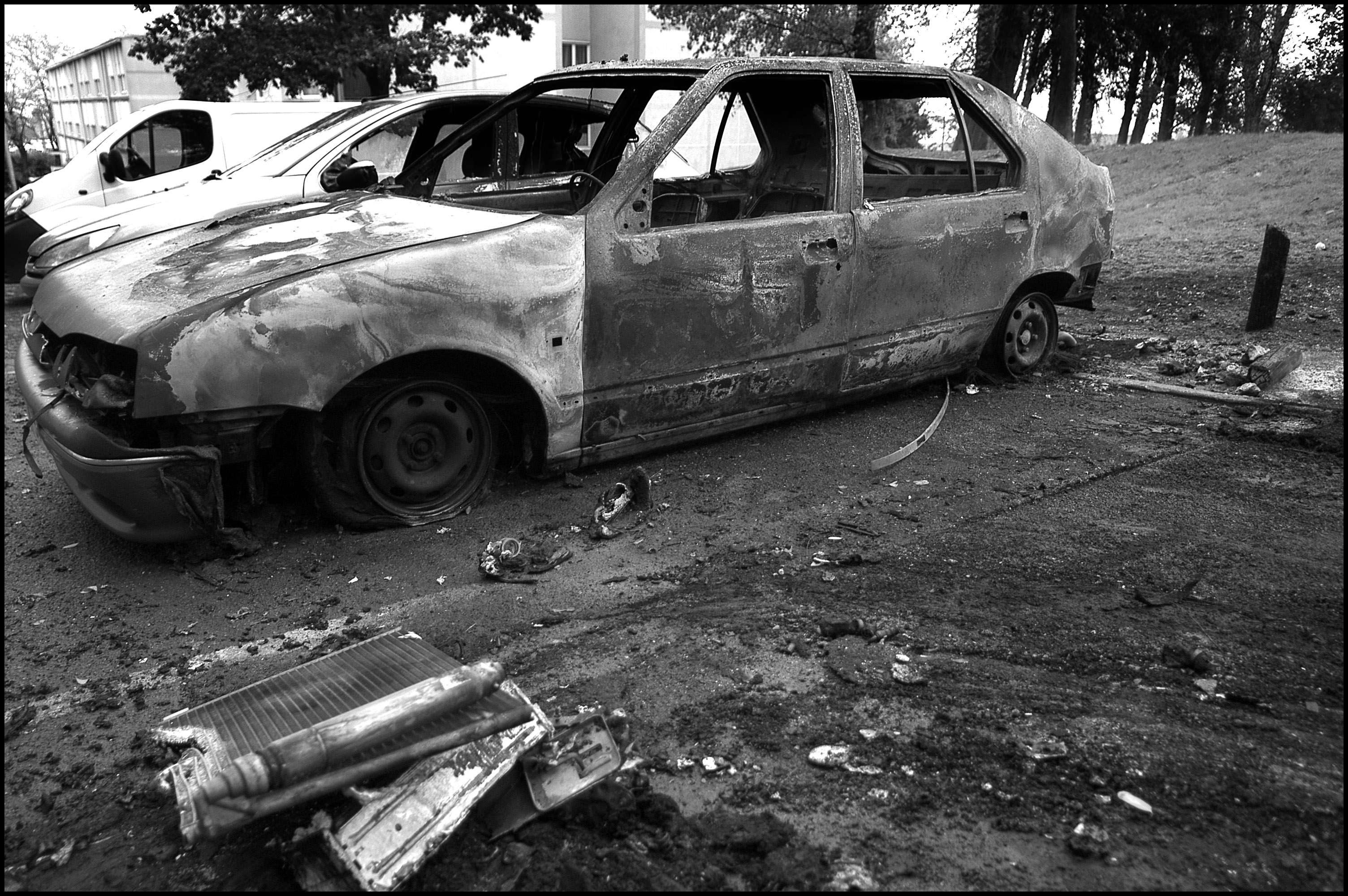
A burnt car in Paris' suburbs

163 vehicles went up in flames on the 20th night of unrest, 15 to 16 November, leading the French government to claim that the country was returning to an "almost normal situation". During the night's events, a Roman Catholic church was burned and a vehicle was rammed into an unoccupied police station in Romans-sur-Isère. In other incidents, a police officer was injured while making an arrest after youths threw bottles of acid at the town hall in Pont-l'Évêque, and a junior high school in Grenoble was set on fire. Fifty arrests were carried out across the country.

On 16 November, the French parliament approved a three-month extension of the state of emergency (which ended on 4 January 2006) aimed at curbing riots by urban youths. The Senate on Wednesday passed the extension – a day after a similar vote in the lower house. The laws allow local authorities to impose curfews, conduct house-to-house searches and ban public gatherings. The lower house passed them by a 346–148 majority, and the Senate by 202–125.

=== Salah Gaham's death ===
Commemorative plaque of Salah Gaham

Salah Gaham was a French concierge, born in Algeria. On the night of 2 November 2005, three cars were burned in the basement of the Forum, the building where he worked in Besançon. He attempted to extinguish the fire but fell unconscious due to smoke inhalation. Firefighters attempted to resuscitate him but were unsuccessful. He died at the age of 34; this was the first death caused by the period of civil unrest. The mayor honored him by placing his name on a local street near the Forum. The street is called "Salah Gaham Square," and is marked by a commemorative plaque.

=== Murders of Jean-Claude Irvoas and Jean-Jacques Le Chenadec ===
On 27 October, Jean-Claude Irvoas, 56, was beaten to death by rioters, after being robbed while he was taking photographs of a street-lamp for his work in Épinay-sur-Seine, Seine-Saint-Denis. On 4 November, Jean-Jacques Le Chenadec, 61, fell into a coma after being hit by Salaheddine Alloul, 22, and died a few days later. The victim was trying to extinguish a trash bin fire near his home at Stains, Seine-Saint-Denis. Alloul was later sentenced to five years in prison.

== Context ==
Commenting on other demonstrations in Paris a few months later, the BBC summarised reasons behind the events included youth unemployment and lack of opportunities in France's poorest communities.

The head of the Direction centrale des renseignements généraux found no Islamic factor in the riots, while the New York Times reported on 5 November 2005 that "majority of the youths committing the acts are Muslim, and of African or North African origin" local youths adding that "many children of native French have also taken part."

The BBC reported that French society's negative perceptions of Islam and social discrimination of immigrants had alienated some French Muslims and may have been a factor in the causes of the riots: "Islam is seen as the biggest challenge to the country's secular model in the past 100 years". It was reported that there was discontent and a sense of alienation felt by many French Muslims and North African immigrants in the suburbs of French cities. However, the editorial also questioned whether or not such alarm is justified, citing that France's Muslim ghettos are not hotbeds of separatism and that "the suburbs are full of people desperate to integrate into the wider society."

== Assessment of rioting ==
=== Summary statistics ===
- Started: 17:20 on Thursday, 27 October 2005 in Clichy-sous-Bois.
- Towns affected: 274 (on 7 November)
- Property damage: 8,973 vehicles (Not including buildings).
- Monetary damage: Estimated at €200 Million.
- Arrests: 2,888
- Deaths: 3 (Salah Gaham, Jean-Claude Irvoas and Jean-Jacques Le Chenadec)
- Police and firefighters injured: 126

=== Figures and tables ===
Note: In the table and charts, events reported as occurring during a night and the following morning are listed as occurring on the day of the morning. The timeline article does the opposite.

Map showing the spread of civil unrest through the many different regions of France Departments with more car burnings than usual Departments with more car burnings than usual the day before Full extent

	day	No. of vehicles burned	arrests	extent of riots	sources
1.	Friday 28 October 2005	NA	27	Clichy-sous-Bois	
2.	Saturday 29 October 2005	29	14	Clichy-sous-Bois	
3.	Sunday 30 October 2005	30	19	Clichy-sous-Bois	
4.	Monday 31 October 2005	NA	NA	Clichy-sous-Bois, Montfermeil	
5.	Tuesday 1 November 2005	69	NA	Seine-Saint-Denis	
6.	Wednesday 2 November 2005	40	NA	Seine-Saint-Denis, Seine-et-Marne, Val-de-Marne Val-d'Oise, Hauts-de-Seine	
7.	Thursday 3 November 2005	315	29	Île-de-France, Dijon, Rouen, Bouches-du-Rhône, Planoise (one death)	
8.	Friday 4 November 2005	596	78	Île-de-France, Dijon, Rouen, Marseille	
9.	Saturday 5 November 2005	897	253	Île-de-France, Rouen, Dijon, Marseille, Évreux, Roubaix, Tourcoing, Hem, Strasbourg, Rennes, Nantes, Nice, Toulouse, Bordeaux, Pau, Lille	
10.	Sunday 6 November 2005	1,295	312	Île-de-France, Nord, Eure, Eure-et-Loir, Haute-Garonne, Loire-Atlantique, Essonne.	
11.	Monday 7 November 2005	1,408	395	274 towns in total. Île-de-France, Nord-Pas-de-Calais, Midi-Pyrénées, Rhône-Alpes, Alsace, Franche-Comté, Angers.	
12.	Tuesday 8 November 2005	1,173	330	Paris region, Lille, Auxerre, Toulouse, Alsace, Lorraine, Franche-Comté, Angers	
13.	Wednesday 9 November 2005	617	280	116 towns in total. Paris region, Toulouse, Rhône, Gironde, Arras, Grasse, Dole, Bassens	
14.	Thursday 10 November 2005	482	203	Toulouse, Belfort	
15.	Friday 11 November 2005	463	201	Toulouse, Lille, Lyon, Strasbourg, Marseille	
16.	Saturday 12 November 2005	502	206	NA	
17.	Sunday 13 November 2005	374	212	Lyon, Toulouse, Carpentras, Dunkirk, Amiens, Grenoble	Émeutes de 2005 dans les banlieues françaises
18.	Monday 14 November 2005	284	115	Toulouse, Faches-Thumesnil, Halluin, Grenoble	
19.	Tuesday 15 November 2005	215	71	Saint-Chamond, Bourges	
20.	Wednesday 16 November 2005	163	50	Paris region, Arras, Brest, Vitry-le-François, Romans-sur-Isère	
TOTAL	20 nights	8,973	2,888		

== Response ==
=== Allegations of an organized plot and Nicolas Sarkozy's comments ===
Nicolas Sarkozy, interior minister at the time, declared a "zero tolerance" policy towards urban violence after the fourth night of riots and announced that 17 companies of riot police (CRS) and seven mobile police squadrons (escadrons de gendarmerie mobile) would be stationed in contentious Paris neighborhoods.

The families of the two dead youths, after refusing to meet with Sarkozy, met with Prime Minister Dominique de Villepin. Azouz Begag, delegate minister for the promotion of equal opportunity, criticized Sarkozy for the latter's use of "imprecise, warlike semantics", while Marie-George Buffet, secretary of the French Communist Party, criticized an "unacceptable strategy of tension" and "the not less inexcusable definition of French youth as 'thugs'" (racaille, a term considered by some to bear implicit racial and ethnic resonances) by the Interior Minister, Sarkozy. Buffet also called for the creation of a parliamentary commission to investigate the circumstances of the death of the two young people, which ignited the riots.

=== State of emergency and measures concerning immigration policy ===
President Jacques Chirac announced a national state of emergency on 8 November. The same day, Lilian Thuram, a famous Football player and member of the Higher Council for Integration, blamed Sarkozy. He explained that discrimination and unemployment were at the root of the problem. On 9 November 2005, Nicolas Sarkozy issued an order to deport foreigners convicted of involvement, provoking concerns from left-wing politicians. He told parliament that 120 foreigners, "not all of whom are here illegally" – had been called in by police and accused of taking part in the nightly attacks. "I have asked the prefects to deport them from our national territory without delay, including those who have a residency visa," he said. The far-right French politician Jean-Marie Le Pen agreed, stating that naturalized French rioters should have their citizenship revoked. The Syndicat de la Magistrature, a magistrate trade-union, criticized Sarkozy's attempts to make believe that most rioters were foreigners, whereas the huge majority of them were French citizens. A demonstration against the expulsion of all foreign rioters and demanding the end of the state of emergency was called for on 15 November in Paris by left-wing and human rights organizations.

On 20 November 2005, Prime Minister Dominique de Villepin announced tightened controls on immigration: Authorities will increase enforcement of requirements that immigrants seeking 10-year residency permits or French citizenship master the French language and integrate into society. Chirac's government also plans to crack down on fraudulent marriages that some immigrants use to acquire residency rights and launch a stricter screening process for foreign students. Anti-racism groups widely opposed the measures, saying that greater government scrutiny of immigrants could stir up racism and racist acts and that energy and money was best deployed for other uses than chasing an ultra-minority of fraudsters.

=== Police ===
An extra 2,600 police were drafted on 6 November. On 7 November, French premier, Dominique de Villepin, announced on the TF1 television channel the deployment of 18,000 police officers, supported by a 1,500 strong reserve. Sarkozy also suspended eight police officers for beating up someone they had arrested after TV displayed the images of this act of police brutality.

=== Media coverage ===
Jean-Claude Dassier, News director general at the private channel TF1 and one of France's leading TV news executives, admitted to self censoring the coverage of the riots in the country for fear of encouraging support for far-right politicians; while public television station France 3 stopped reporting the numbers of torched cars, apparently in order not to encourage "record making" between delinquent groups.

Foreign news coverage was criticized by president Chirac as showing in some cases excessiveness (démesure) and Prime Minister de Villepin said in an interview to CNN that the events should not be called riots, as the situation was not violent to the extent of the 1992 Los Angeles riots, with no death casualties being reported during the unrest itself – although it had begun after the deaths of two youth pursued by the police.

=== Backlash against French hip hop artists ===
French rappers and hip hop artists were accused of inciting the youth of the banlieues to riot. After the riots, 200 French parliament members called for legal action against several French rappers, accusing them of inciting the violence.

== Judicial consequences ==
Following ten years of preliminary proceedings, a trial was held in March 2015 against the police officers that were involved on the night when the deaths of Zyed Benna and Bouna Traore took place. The trial ended up without any convictions, which triggered an outcry from some members of the public.

== See also ==
- Summary and map of the 2005 French riots
- 2006 Brussels riots
- 2007 Villiers-le-Bel riots
- 2009 French riots
- 2013 Trappes riots
- 2017 French riots
- 2023 Nahel Merzouk riots

== Notes ==
1. Planoise-reflexion (In French)
2. Besançon.fr (In French)
3. Article from Le Monde
4. "Scotsman" on renewal of state of emergency
5. Indymedia on renewal of state of emergency, #torched cars
6. "Each night between 40 and 60 cars are torched" according to the Council of State in Le Canard enchaîné #4442, 14 December 2005.
7. Renewal of state of emergency (article from Le Monde)

== Contemporary news reports and essays ==
- Durand, Jacky Libération (29 October 2005), "Pompier façon légion romaine" (Firefighters à la roman legion)
- New Straits Times, p. 28 (8 November 2005), "Fatwa against riot issued"
- New Straits Times, p. 28 (8 November 2005), "French violence rages on"
- Rousseau, Ingrid Associated Press (31 October 2005), "France to Step Up Security After Riots"
- Gecker, Jocelyn Associated Press (2 November 2005), "French government in crisis mode"
- Gecker, Jocelyn Associated Press (2 November 2005), "Seventh Day of Violence Erupts Near Paris" by
- Keaten, Jamey Associated Press (3 November 2005), "French residents can only watch amid riots"
- ABC News (4 November 2005), "Paris Riots in Perspective". .
- New Straits Times, p. 24. (5 November 2005), "Riots spread to suburbs".
- Heneghan, Tom Reuters (5 November 2005), "Paris seeks 'hidden hands' in riots"
- Reuters (6 November 2005). "France's Chirac says restoring order top priority". AlertNet. Archived from the original on 29 December 2005.
- Bouteldja, Naima Red Pepper "Paris is burning" (9 November 2005)
- Sciolino, Elaine The New York Times (10 November 2005), "Chirac, Lover of Spotlight, Avoids Glare of France's Fires"
- Neue Zürcher Zeitung (11 November 2005), "Die Banlieues kommen nicht zur Ruhe" ("The suburbs do not get quiet")
- BBC News (17 November 2005), "French violence 'back to normal'"
- French Riots: A Failure of the Elite, Not the Republic, JURIST
- French Riots: A Wake-up Call for the West, The Indypendent
- French Right Reviles Rappers, The Indypendent
