= 2025 Italian general strikes and protests for Gaza =

Labour strikes and protests in Italy against complicity in the Gaza genocide

General strikes for Gaza
- 22 September 2025 Italian general strike 3 October 2025 Italian general strike 28 November 2025 Italian general strike Part of the Gaza war protests and Gen Z protests
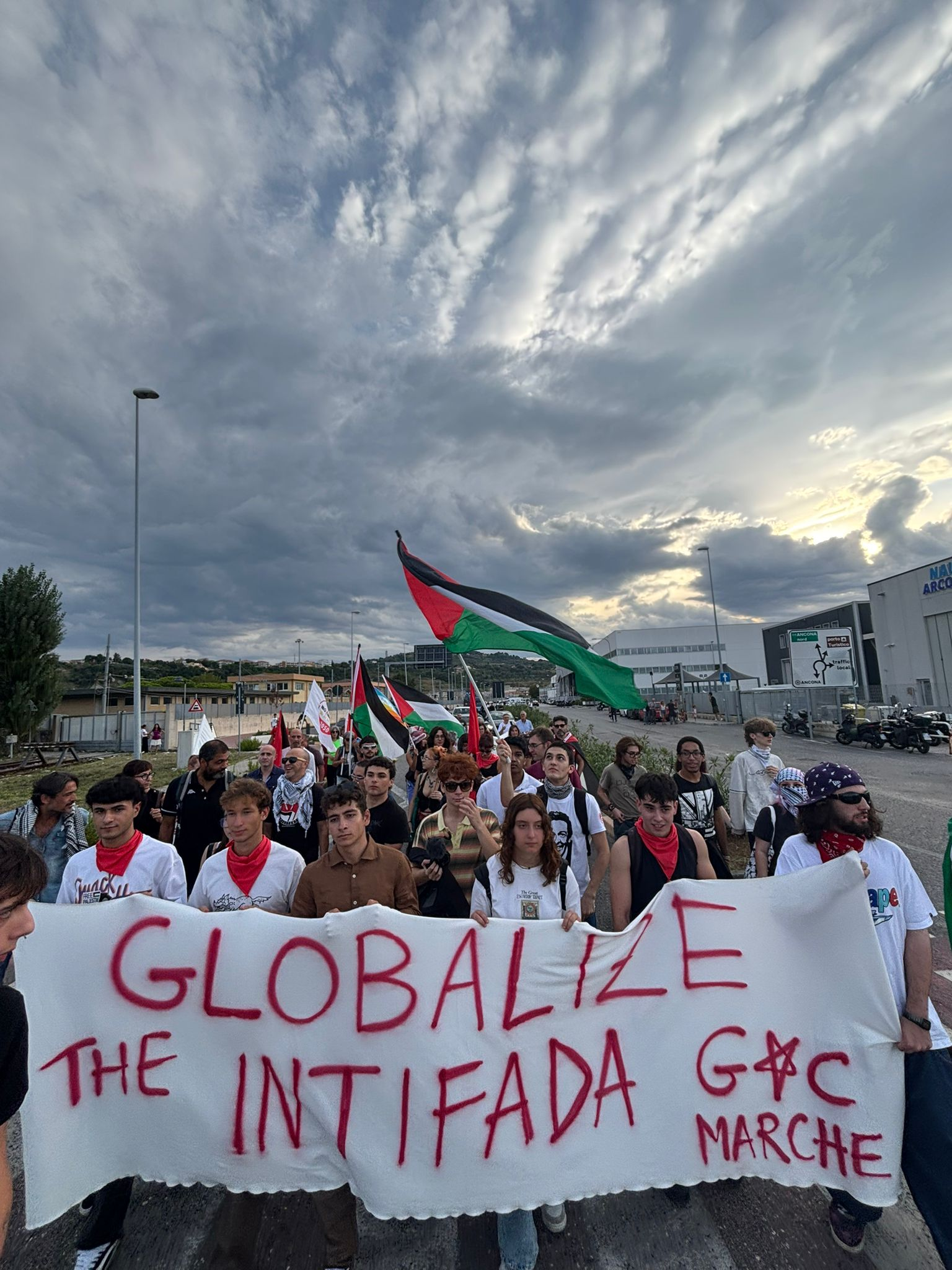
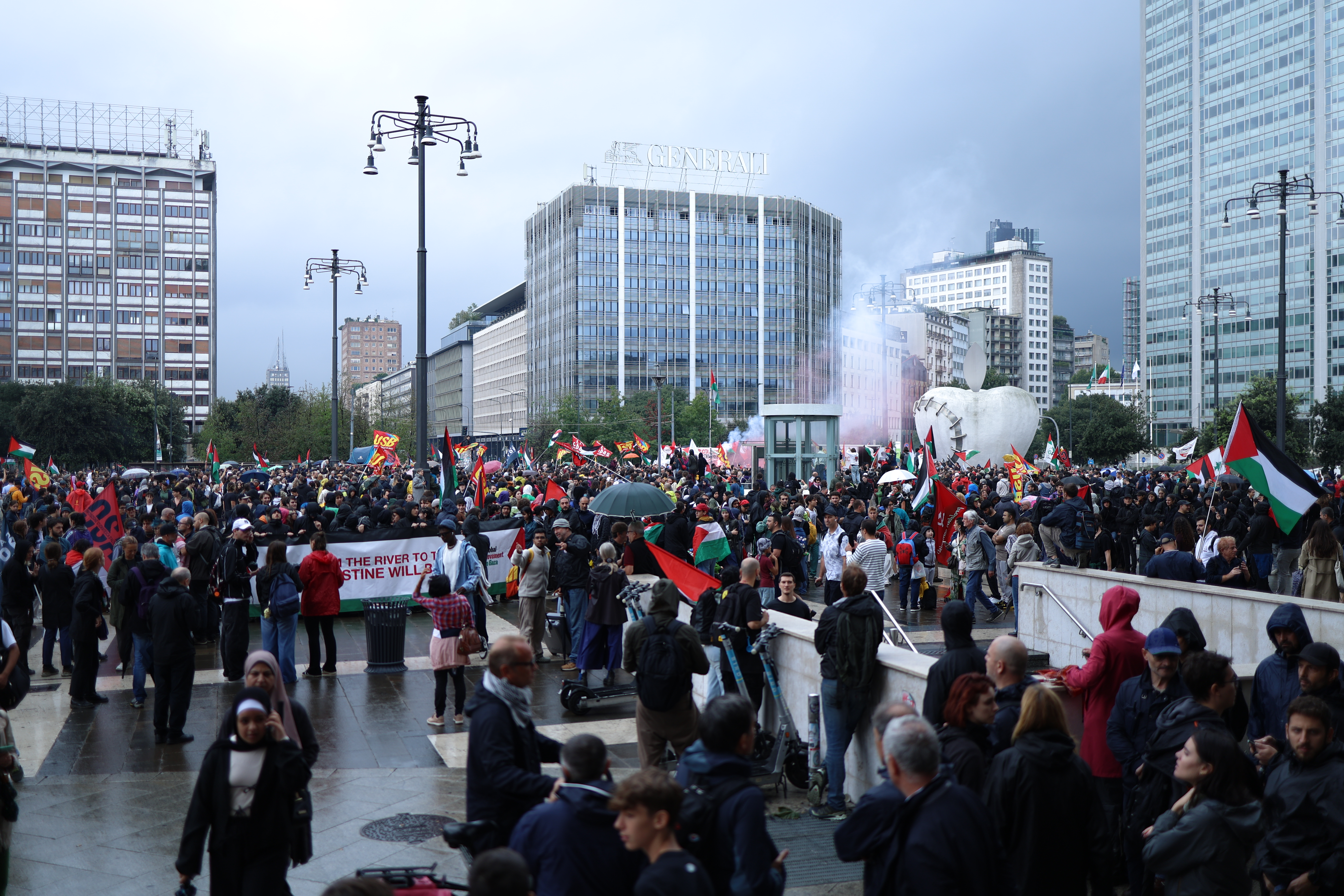
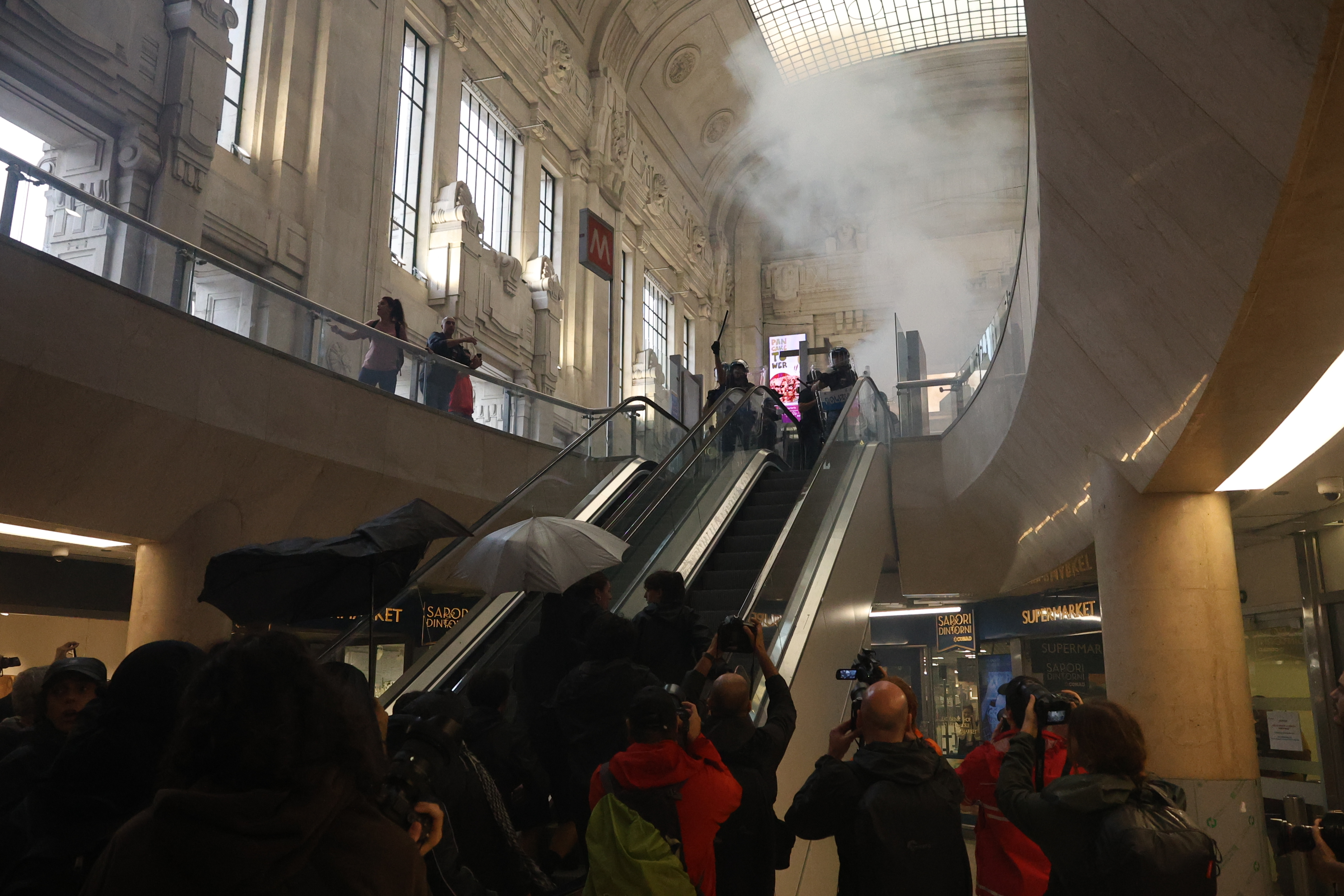
- Top to bottom: Giovani Comunisti/e (Young Communists) at the general strike for Gaza in Ancona, Marche; Piazza Duca d'Aosta in Milan, facing Milano Centrale railway station, crowded with people before the riots (credits: Chronocol Media); protesters climb the metro escalators to enter the main hall of Milano Centrale station, where police officers await them at the top (credits: Chronocol Media)
- Date: 19 September 2025 – 29 November 2025
- Location: over 75 municipalities across Italy, San Marino and Ticino, Switzerland
- Caused by: Gaza genocide, famine and Israeli blockade of the Gaza Strip
- Goals: Stopping arms shipments from Italian ports to Israel; Halting Israel–Italy relations; Recognition of the State of Palestine by Italy; Safe passage of the Global Sumud Flotilla and the release of its activists
- Methods: Strike actions

Parties
Left-wing pro-Palestinian groups: USB; USI; CUB; SGB; ADL; CGIL; Young Communists; RSM; CUSP; RdC; FGC; PaP; PRC; Collettivo San Marino per la Palestina; Fridays for Future; UDAP; Others	Right-wing pro-Palestinian groups: FN; CasaPound	Government forces: Government of Italy; Government of Switzerland; Government of San Marino; Anti-demonstration forces: Setteottobre; Christians for Israel; EDIPI; ICEJ; Ghesher Center; GN; Leftists for Israel; Unorganized Neofascist armed groups; Lotta Studentesca

Lead figures
Collective leadership	Roberto Fiore	Giorgia Meloni; Matteo Piantedosi; Ignazio Cassis

Number
22 September: 100,000–500,000 (independently verified); 1 million, including 300,000 in Rome (self-reported); 3 October: 400,000 (according to the Ministry of the Interior); 2 million, including 300,000 in Rome (self-reported); 4 October: 300,000 in Rome (according to the police); 1 million in Rome (self-reported)		

Casualties
- Injuries: at least 187 (including 60 in Milan)
- Arrested: at least 49 (in Milan, Bologna and Udine)

On 22 September 2025, a 24-hour general strike called by grassroots unions Unione Sindacale di Base (USB), Confederazione Unitaria di Base (CUB), Sindacato Generale di Base (SGB), Associazione Difesa Lavoratrici e Lavoratori (ADL) and Italian Syndicalist Union (USI) was held across Italy to protest the country's complicity in the Gaza war, and saw the participation of hundreds of thousands of citizens. Protests also took place in San Marino and Bellinzona, Ticino, Switzerland, and continued in Italy for the next days, fuelled by Israel's attacks on and boarding of the Global Sumud Flotilla (GSF), with a second strike proclaimed on 3 October. The events have been identified as part of the wider Gen Z protests phenomenon.

== Background and goals ==
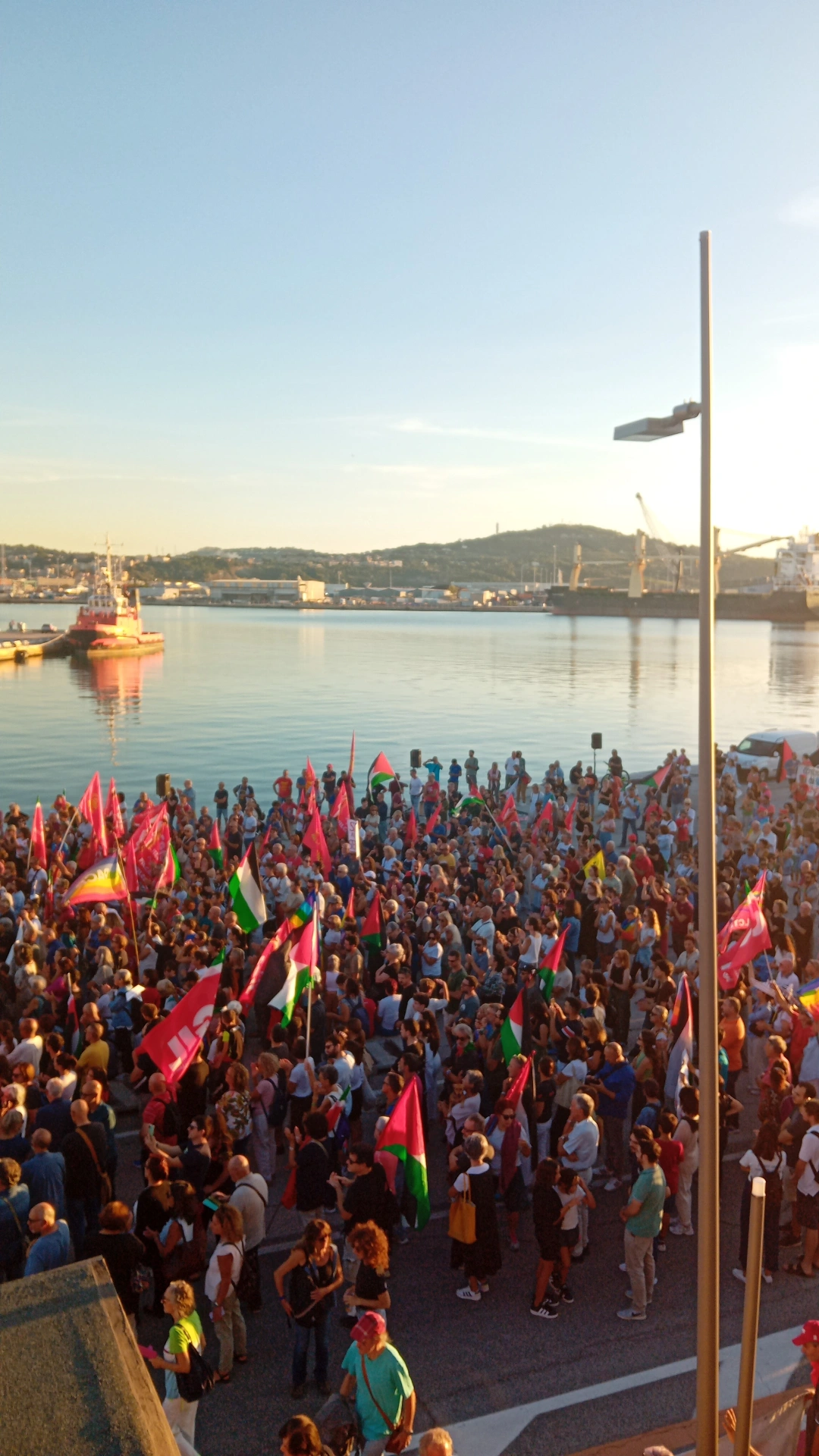
Strike at the port of Ancona, 19 September 2025

Amid Israel's daily escalations in the Gaza Strip, including its mass killings, naval blockade and man-made famine, coupled with its attempts to thwart humanitarian efforts like the Global Sumud Flotilla, the grassroots unions proclaimed a general strike against what they defined as the complicity of Giorgia Meloni's government in a genocide. (Note: Attributed to multiple sources:) The strike, marked by the slogan Blocchiamo tutto ("Let's Block Everything"), was aimed at implementing a nationwide block of ports, roads and workplaces to stop the shipments of arms and supplies to Israel. USB called for "the immediate break-off of relations with the terrorist state of Israel". Before the protests, groups such as Christians for Israel Italy, Evangelicals of Italy for Israel (EDIPI), the International Christian Embassy Jerusalem (ICEJ), the Bney Efrain Association and the Gesher Center sent a letter to Giorgia Meloni, asking for her to oppose the protests.

The protests followed a separate day of more limited industrial action, lasting four hours and excluding essential public services, that was called for 19 September by the Transport Federation of the Italian General Confederation of Labour (CGIL), Italy's largest trade union. CUB Trasporti, which joined the 19 September action, withdrew from the 22 September strike along with USB Lavoro Privato. The Catholic Italian Confederation of Trades Unions (CISL) and the moderate Italian Labour Union (UIL) did not participate, opting instead for fundraising and solidarity initiatives.

On 20 September, protests in support of the general strike, and with its same goals, continued in various places of Italy, such as in Mestre where over ten thousand people protested, blocking the entrance to the city entirely, with the official support of CGIL, USB, parties that include the Five Star Movement (M5S), the Democratic Party (PD) and the Greens and Left Alliance (AVS), and organizations such as ANPI and the Italian-based NGO Emergency. Another ten thousand people also gathered in Turin on the same day, sponsored by Rete Torino per Gaza ("Turin Network for Gaza"), local mosques and political parties such as M5S, Communist Refoundation Party and Power to the People. A minor protest was also scheduled in Rome where the organization Last Generation proclaimed an unauthorized hunger strike protest supporting the general strike and the Palestinian cause, which was however halted before its start with the arrest of 4 activists.

The general strike of some metropolitan lines started to be applied as early as 21:00 local time, on September 21.

== Events ==
=== First strike and aftermath ===
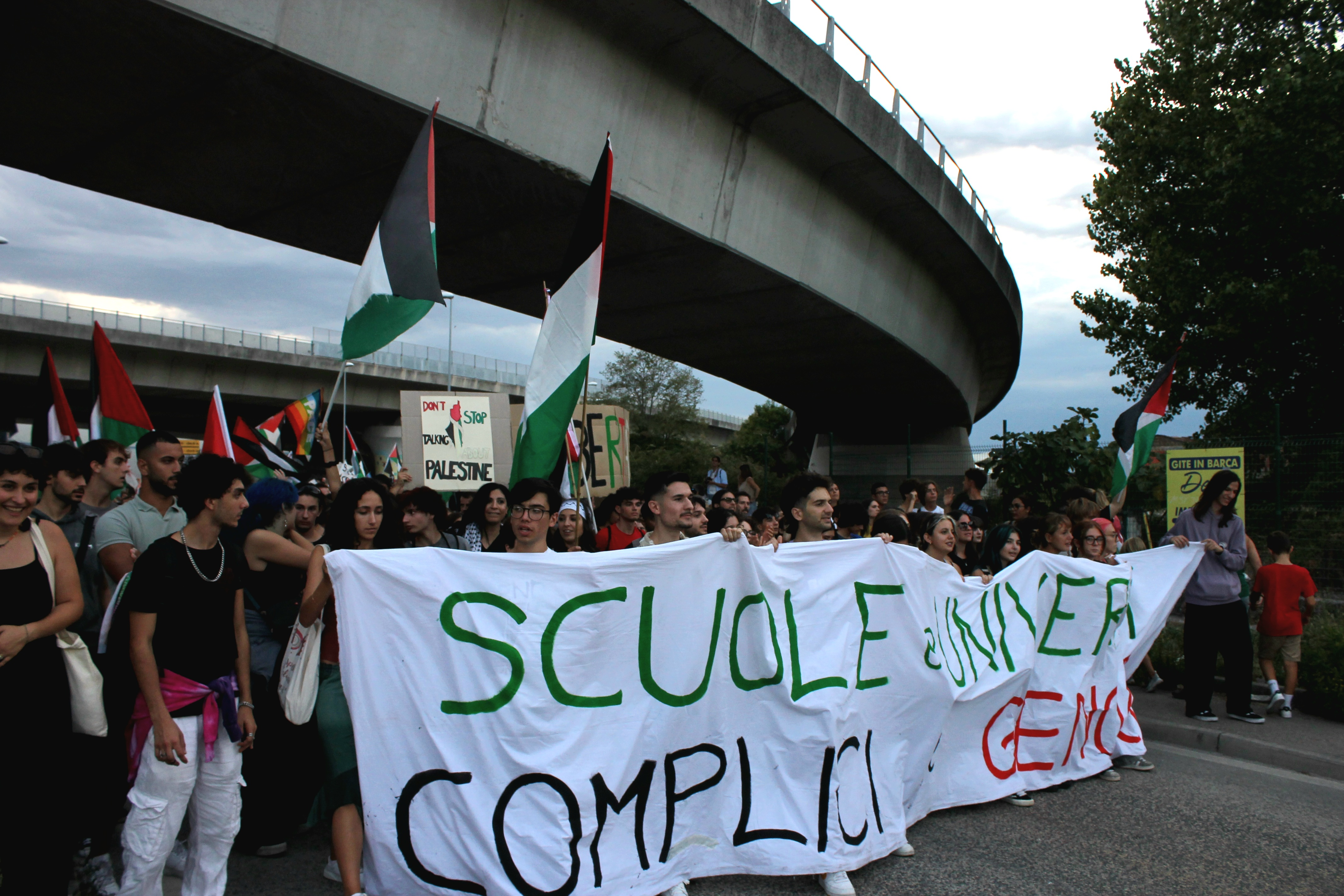
Rete degli Studenti Medi (RSM) at the general strike for Gaza in Ancona

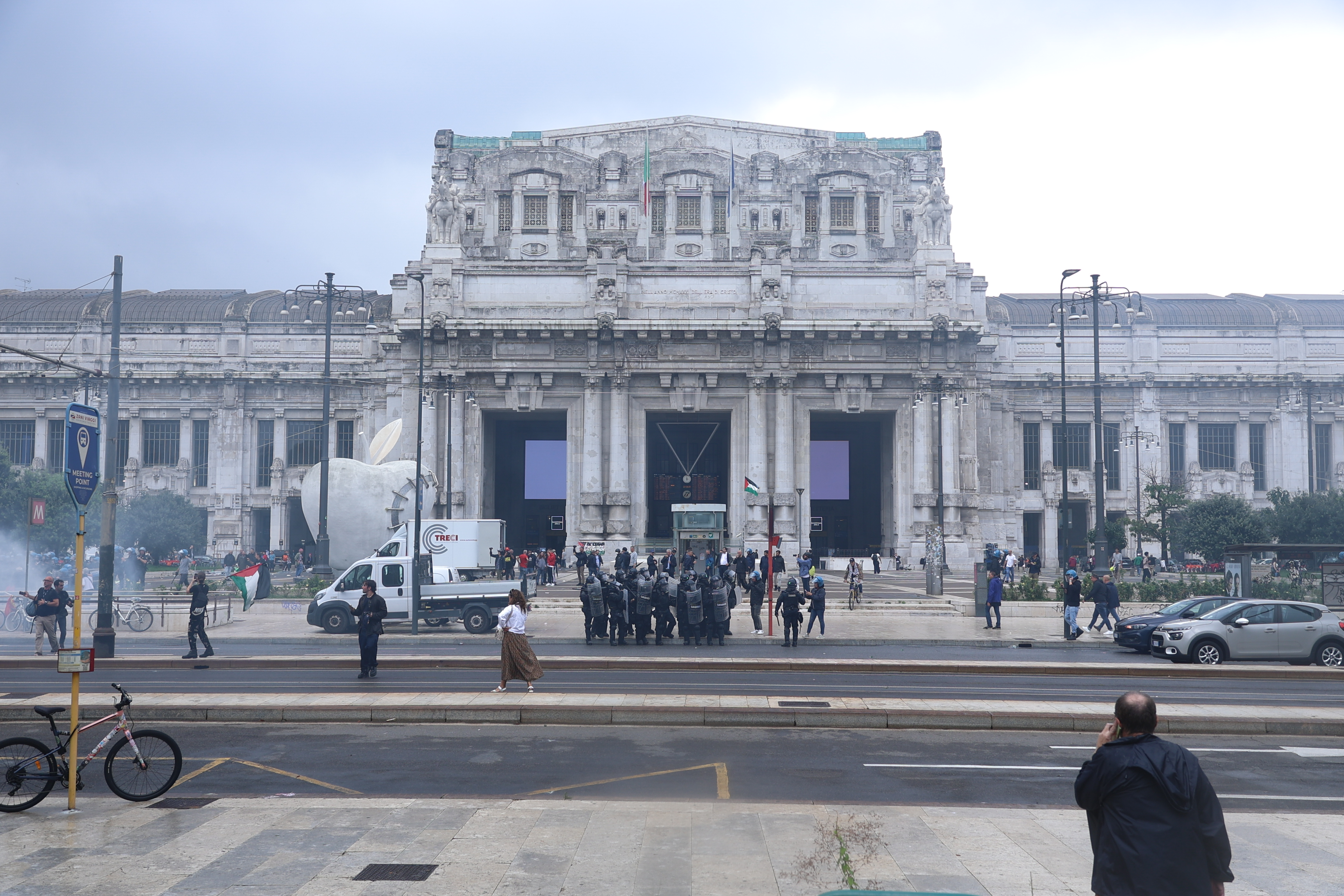
The facade of Milano Centrale railway station from Piazza Duca d'Aosta after the square was cleared, with Carabinieri advancing towards Via Vittor Pisani, where the protest had been dispersed. (credits: Chronocol Media)

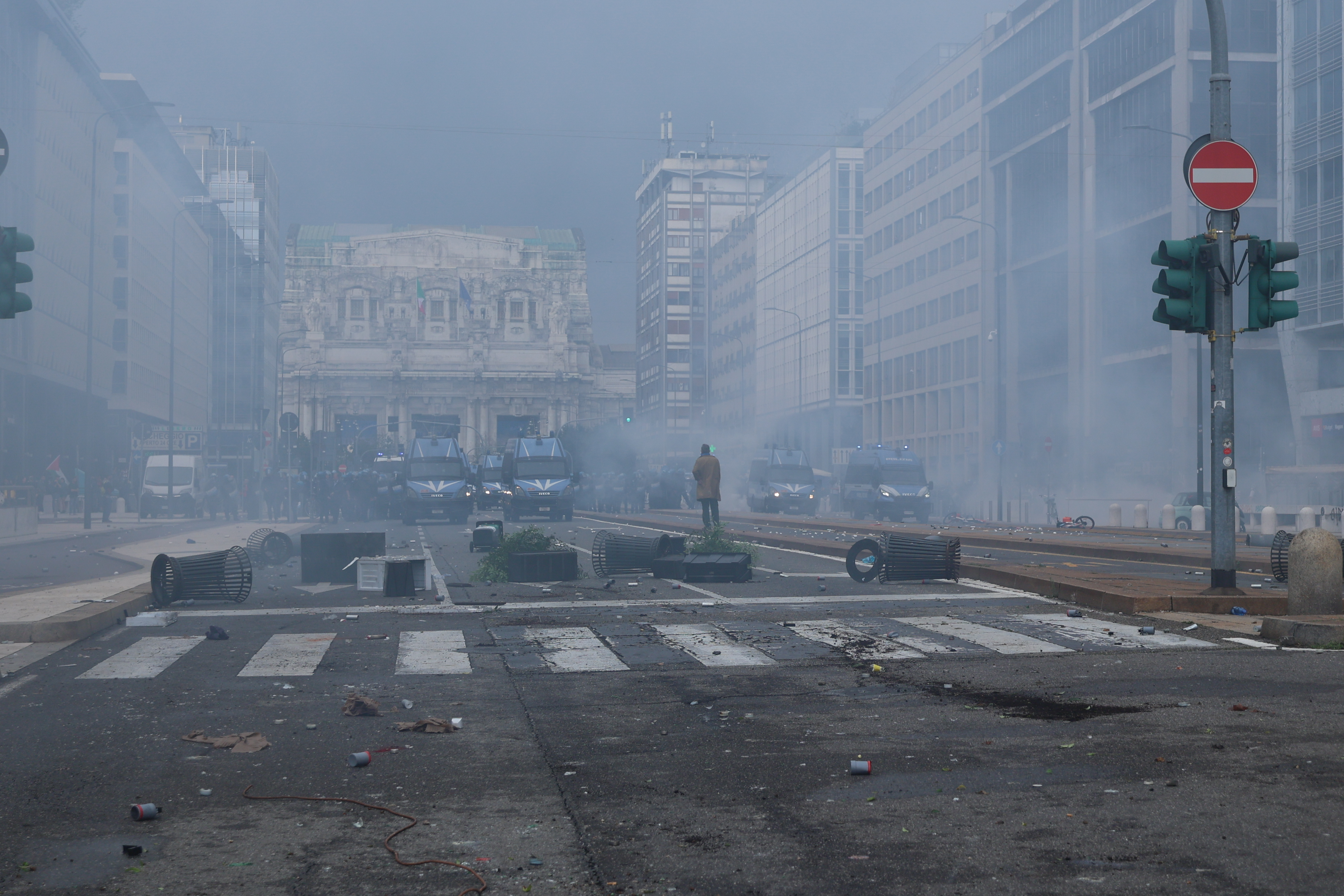
A man stands facing police on Via Vittor Pisani during a brief pause in the protest, moments before another police charge. (credits: Chronocol Media)

During the 22 September strike, violent clashes broke out between protesters and police forces, most notably in Milan, where the former smashed a window at the Centrale railway station and threw smoke bombs, bottles and stones, and the latter beat and fired tear gas and pepper spray at them. At least 10 people were arrested, 60 police were wounded, and the M4 metro line was shut down. Major clashes also occurred at the Napoli Centrale railway station in Naples, where protesters broke through a security deployment and reached the platforms. A protest at a highway in Bologna was dispersed by water cannon and smoke bombs, with at least eight arrests, while a separate group disrupted lectures at the University of Bologna. Protesters in Rome gathered outside the Termini railway station, forcing the cancellation of several services, and broke during lectures at Sapienza University, while dockworkers in Genoa, La Spezia, Ravenna, Trieste, Venice and Livorno halted all arms transfers to Israel and other protesters blocked the entrance to the ports. Other major student and workers' actions took place in Turin, Palermo, Catania, Potenza, Bari, Lecce, Brindisi, Sassari, Cagliari, Bolzano, Pisa, Calenzano, Campi Bisenzio (the location of a Leonardo weapons factory), Brescia and Novara.

On 24 September, the Italian minister of defence Guido Crosetto expressed his condemnation of the recent drone attacks on the Global Sumud Flotilla and announced that, after consulting with the Chief of the Defence Staff General Luciano Portolano and Prime Minister Giorgia Meloni, he had authorized the immediate dispatch of the multipurpose frigate Virginio Fasan to assist Italian citizens on board the flotilla, of which he had informed the military attaché of the Israeli Defence Forces in Italy.

The attacks had caused protests in many places of Italy. The very first reaction was from CGIL, which announced an immediate protest in Piazza di Monte Citorio in Rome (where the Chamber of Deputies is located). Another protest in Rome, protesting armament sale to Israel and involving action in front of a Rheinmetall factory, continued even after the arrival of law enforcement, with some individuals chaining themselves to the entrance of the building. Student movements in Rome also occupied various universities and schools, protesting the attack on the Flotilla; students at Sapienza University announced a permanent occupation of the faculty until agreements with Israeli universities are suspended, following the example of other Italian institutions. In Turin, at least over two thousand people reunited in Piazza Castello, making its way to the Torino Porta Susa railway station; after reaching the station, some of the protesters entered the trains where they shouted and hanged various slogans and posters, whilst others, around 20:00 local time, occupied the railway track of the station, blocking the circulation of the local train. In Florence, students organized a protest which started in Via Santo Spirito and ended in front of the local U.S. consulate. Meanwhile, at the port of Livorno and the port of Taranto, protests prevented Israeli ships from docking. In Milan, a protest sponsored by CUB started in Piazza della Scala before going towards Piazza Castello, with protesters chanting "Bella ciao". In Pisa, a protest started in Piazza XX Settembre, before the protesters occupied the San Rossore railway station, preventing various trains from circulating. In Bologna, the Prima Piazza del Nettuno and its surrounding areas were occupied by a protest which counted thousands of people with many of them asking for Israeli exclusion from the Giro dell'Emilia; the University of Bologna was also occupied. Protests also took place in Osnago, Cuneo and Verona. On September 25, protests continued, including one in Macerata in which the group "Saturdays for Palestine" protested in Piazza della Libertà, one in Spoleto and one in Chieti. CGIL Catania also protested in Piazza Stesicoro with a partial strike and demonstration.

USB announced that on 26 September a new general strike, with the same goals as the last one, was going to be held due to the renewed Israeli attacks of 24 September. Starting from that day, USB, along with Global Movement for Gaza and Palestinian associations in Italy, set up a permanent mobilization across squares and public spaces in the country, named 100 Piazze per Gaza and beginning in Piazza dei Cinquecento in Rome. Organizers vowed to escalate the pressure on the government on the next national demonstration, to be held in Rome on 4 October. On 26 September, neofascist party Forza Nuova participated in the protests, condemning Italy whilst also ridiculing and antagonizing left-wing protesters. Despite moments of tensions the two groups did not have an escalation. In the late hours of 27 September, dockworkers at the port of Genoa blocked a weapons cargo from being loaded on the Israel-bound Zim New Zealand vessel, forcing it to leave empty; this followed a day of public demonstrations organized by Collettivo Autonomo Laboratori Portuali (CALP), Music For Peace, USB, CGIL, UIL, student unions and the local Catholic clergy, and led by the mayor of the city Silvia Salis and the president of Liguria Marco Bucci; it also saw the continued occupation of the University of Genoa and a public assembly among delegations of dockworkers' unions from around Europe, including France, Greece, Slovenia, Cyprus, the Basque Country and Hamburg. In the following days, dockworkers in Livorno refused to work for another Zim vessel, the Virginia, while a protest in Taranto blocked an Eni oil cargo to Israel, the Seasalvia, for several hours before it was able to depart.

=== Second strike and aftermath ===
==== October ====
CGIL and USB threatened another strike in the event of an Israeli attack on the Sumud Flotilla; this was confirmed by both trade unions on 1 October, when Israel started boarding GSF ships, with general strikes proclaimed for October 3 in conjunction with an alteady planned railway strike. CGIL secretary Maurizio Landini called the Israeli interception "an act of war", while Minister of Transport Matteo Salvini stated that the government "would not tolerate" a second strike. In the hours following the attack and all through the next day, spontaneous protests and mobilizations erupted in the main cities of the country, namely Rome (university, Piazza dei Cinquecento, Termini station and facing Palazzo Chigi), Milan (university, Cadorna station and Piazza della Scala), Naples (Federico II University, L'Orientale University and Centrale station), Turin (university and Porta Nuova station), Bologna (university and Piazza Maggiore), Palermo (Piazza Sant'Anna), Florence (Piazza Santissima Annunziata and Santa Maria Novella station), Genoa (university and port), Livorno (port), Pisa (university, Centrale station and Palazzo Ricci), Bari (university and the municipality itself, led by Vito Leccese), Siena (Piazza del Campo) and others, with student collectives setting up permanent occupations in their faculties and schools. (Note: Attributed to multiple sources:)

The San Marino Confederation of Labour supported the general strikes openly and supported those willing to protest.

On the day of the strike, which was shorter than the previous one but was equally joined by hundreds of thousands of citizens, there were delays and cancellations in railway transport, and several highways and ports were blocked by protesters. Clashes with police forces occurred at the RA 1 and A 51 highways outside Bologna and Milan, respectively.

A previously scheduled national rally in Rome was held on 4 October, with heavy clashes with the police erupting towards the end; cars were set ablaze by some protesters and several people were injured. At the same time, in Locarno, Switzerland, around 200 people reunited to protest in favour of Palestine and in coordination with the Roman protests. On the same day, militants associated with CasaPound were spotted in Esquilino attacking pro-Palestinian protesters, despite the organization's opposition to Israel and pro-Palestinian stance and activism up until then. On 5 October, in San Marino, a huge fundraising protest managed to gather funds for the San Marino for Gaza project, organized with the help of the NGOs EducAid and Marciamela Association at the end of August. On 12 October 2025, a Pro-Palestinian protest in Trieste tried to disturb the Barcolana. On 13 October 2025, pro-Palestinian students occupied the Vincenzo Arangio Ruiz Technical Institute. The day after a video from the occupied institute, showing the students performing the Roman salute and shouting "Dux! Dux! Dux!" caused controversy. On the same day the Isaac Newton High School was also occupied in Rome. A protest was also held in Udine on 14 October, in conjunction with an Italy vs Israel qualification match for the 2026 FIFA World Cup at the Stadio Friuli, as part of the "Show Israel the Red Card" campaign. It was reported that the Ministry of Interior would coordinate Mossad and the Italian police to escort the Israeli team throughout its stay, with additional forces deployed to keep protesters outside the stadium; although the reports were dismissed by the ministry's Department of Security, parts of city around the stadium and the hotel were shut down, with sightings of drones, helicopters and snipers ahead of the match. Clashes erupted when protesters tried to break through the police belt, and were dispersed with water cannons; between 5,000 and 10,000 participants were reported. 15 people were arrested and 2 journalists were injured. On the same day, in San Marino, the Collettivo San Marino per la Palestina (San Marino Collective for Palestine) stated that the cease‑fire in Gaza must mark the beginning of Palestinian self‑determination, end the occupation, free the hostages, allow humanitarian aid, and ensure international justice, and that up until those goals were not met they would continue to protest, mobilize and organize, like their Italian counterparts. On 15 October, the Montessori High School was occupied by pro-Palestinian students in Rome. At the same time, the Marco Polo and Buontalenti high schools were also similarly occupied in Florence. On 17 October there were protests in Bologna with the support of students from the Aldini, Sabin, and Minghetti high schools in Bologna. After the announcement of a bill proposed by senator Maurizio Gasparri, which promotes to make anti-Zionism and anti-semtism legal synonyms, various protests were held. On 18 October 2025, Cambiare Rotta and Osa organized a protest in Rome near the palace of the Ministry of Education and in various universities protesting the bill. Similar events took place in Naples and Florence, with further promises to "fill the squares" of Italy over the matter. A portion of the Florentine protesters detached from the rest and headed for the Florence Airport, where they had a scuffle with the stationed police units, causing 13 people to be injured, ten among the police and three among the protesters. Another protest took place in Florence on the same day at the University of Florence, which was occupied by its students asking the university to cut any ties with Israel. On 17 October, in Switzerland, the Independent Union of Students and Apprentices (SISA) stated that on 17 November they would organize a "Day for Palestine" in Bellinzona. On 20 October 2025, the University of Trento and the Vittoriani High School in Naples were occupied by their students as a sign of protest The USB and the Autonomous Port Group of Livorno organization jointly organized a pro-Palestinian protest in Piombino.

On 21 October 2025, USB and CUB declared a new general strike in support of Palestine, which was scheduled on 28 November 2025. On 23 October 2025, the Agrario and Alberti high schools in Florence were occupied, whilst two new educational institutes were also occupied in Naples resulting in one of the school's principals, the one in charge of the Mazzini High School, to call law enforcement, asking for the students to be kicked out. On 24 October, a protest consisting of at least 400 people took place at the Piazza Verdi in Rome, which was supposed to be static. However, despite attempts at diplomacy between the participants and law enforcement, the protest tried to reach another area; this prompted the police to use hydrants and a major scuffle occurred, resulting in 41 law enforcement officers being injured and 12 people being arrested. The students' intention to occupy the Giordano-Striano technical institute was called off when the principal of the school locked herself in the principal room for over 48 hours. Between the night of 23 and 24 October, during the occupation of the Bramante High School in Rome, a group of 15 people affiliated with far-right politics entered the school building, drew swastikas in the corridors and threw glass bottles around, yelling "we're going to destroy everything in here!," before being chased away in the schoolyard by the occupying students. The following night the same group attacked again and they threw projectiles at the entrance (almost injuring the occupying students), climbed in, used bins, kicks and sticks to break down the door, tried to remove a safety barricade, swung large sticks inside, and fled. On 25 October, at the Mostra d'Oltremare in Naples, a group of protesters voiced their dissent against the participation of Teva Pharmaceuticals at the Pharmexpo 2025 and later got into a clash with the deployed police forces, resulting in two injuries (part of the police force) and three arrested activists. Another, significantly bigger, protest took place in Turin against foreign minister Antonio Tajani over his stance on Gaza, resulting in two injured officers. In Genoa, on 26 October at midnight, a group of at least 40 people raided the Da Vinci High School; the armed group, reported to be neofascist, had gotten weapons from a nearby construction site and upon raiding the school emptied the fire extinguishers, yelled "Glory to the Duce!," drew swastikas, broke doors and windows and tried to injure students. The people involved have been identified by some sources as relatively young (15–17 years old). Another raid occurred on the same night in the Leonardo High School in similar circumstances. On 27 October 2025, the Bergese and Firpo Buonarroti high schools in Genoa were occupied by pro-Palestinian students. On the same day, in Turin, a very tense situation was initiated following the arrival of a young man distributing leaflet by militants of National Youth (the youth wing of the ruling Brothers of Italy party) against maranza subculture. Soon after, a scuffle occurred between the National Youth members and the pro-Palestinian student committee of the occupied Einstein high school, resulting in one arrest. Brothers of Italy (FdI) denounced the incident and its Youth Wing stated it would not stop "raising awareness" against maranza culture. Meanwhile, the committee allegedly stated some plainclothes officers intervened among the students and caused the scuffle to escalate before beating and injuring the arrested student. After the arrest, the FdI headquarters in Turin were egged by an unorganized spontaneous protest. Meanwhile, protests in Bologna and Ancona occurred. Later that night, in Venice, at the site of the Ca' Foscari University, the "Leftists for Israel" group was interrupted from giving a speech during an event as members of the Front of Communist Youth (FGC). On 28 October, the Melissa Bassi High School in Naples was occupied by pro-Palestinian students as well and an attempt to occupy the Francesco Sbordone High School failed. On the same day, evidence of a possible plot to raid the Firpo–Buonarroti High School were uncovered by the students. On that night, the Firpo–Buonarroti High School, Nautico High School, and Calvino High School were raided by neofascist armed groups; however, only the raid on the Firpo–Buonarroti High School managed to enter the school, injuring two students.

==== November ====
During the night between November 2 and 3, the Mamiani High School in Prati, Rome, was occupied. A group of students blocked the entrance with a barrier made of school desks, preventing anyone from entering the historic high school. The school took a stand with a statement referring to "danger to the safety of the boys and girls inside the school", but also to "a serious act against democracy and the right to education". The same happened at the Aristofane language and classical high school in Tufello: after a meeting convened on Sunday, the students joined the protest "in defense of the Palestinian people and against the genocide taking place." On the evening of November 3, a group of young neo-fascists attacked the Righi high school, occupied by pro-Palestinian students on October 23, shouting "Duce, duce". The occupiers repelled the attackers, and an intense bottle-throwing battle began in the street. One girl was injured in the neck. The authorities searched the houses of three of the raiders and linked them to the far-right organization Lotta Studentesca (Students Fight). On 7 November 2025, in the middle of the day, a group of raiders attacked the Santa Beatrice primary/secondary school in Trullo, Rome; The raiders threw a cherry bomb, drew swastikas and other far-right symbols on the walls, and heavily damaged the school's intercom. The school stated that this was the second incident of this caliber, as they had already been attacked on 31 October. The school seems to have shown support for Pro-Palestinian strikes as early as 29 October 2025. On the same day, later that night, over 400 students of the Righi high school held a protest in which multiple of them were seen chanting the slogan "No pasarán". At the same time, a portion of the quarter of Tufello spontaneously mobilized to protect the occupied school from any raiders. On 10 November, the Giordano Bruno and Pacinotti-Archimede high schools, in Rome's Municipality III, were occupied. On the same day, a pro-Palestinian protest took place in the city of Ivrea.

On 14 November, in Milan, Bologna, Rome and Naples, there were a series of protests dubbed "No Meloni Day". These protests tackled a series of topics, such as environmentalism, European rearmament, the conditions of Italian schools and the Palestinian genocide. The protests were also staunchly anti-government and anti-establishment, even calling to oust the government and criticizing the conduct of Meloni, Salvini, Valditara and Schlein towards the Palestinian question, the inaction on neo-fascist raids in schools and the other topics. The protests were organized by Unione degli Studenti (Union of Students), Opposizione Studentesca d'Alternativa (Alternative Student Opposition), Fridays for Future, Network of Communists and other groups. 10,000 protesters showed up in Milan, over 1,000 in Turin, 300–400 in Bologna and a few hundred were present in Naples. The protests resulted in 9 injuries.

On 21 November, upon being denied access to classrom T2 by the University of Verona, around 600–800 forcefully occupied it without any permit in order to hold a conference that guested Greta Thunberg, Maya Issa and Simone Zambrin. The conference discussed the war in Gaza, the dangers of anti-semitism and the need to keep protesting.

On 29 November, following a general strike on the previous day, pro-Palestinian protests were held across the country, with over 20,000 demonstrators in Rome, including Greta Thunberg, Thiago Ávila and Francesca Albanese (UN Special Rapporteur on the occupied Palestinian territories). Protesters denounced the complicity of the Italian government media with Israel, and some protesters broke into the headquarters of La Stampa in Turin.

== Reactions ==
=== Italy ===
Italian prime minister Giorgia Meloni criticized the 22 September strike, calling protesters "hooligans" and claiming that clashing with the police and destroying private property would not help the people in Gaza; ministers Matteo Salvini and Matteo Piantedosi, and Senate chair Ignazio La Russa, joined her remarks. Media have highlighted the posture of the Meloni government as strictly pro-Israel during the war, with the cabinet ruling out any recognition of the State of Palestine in contrast with what numerous other European countries chose to do at the opening of the 80th session of the UN General Assembly. Replying to Meloni, opposition leader Elly Schlein stated her condemnation for the violence of "a few hundred protesters" while demanding that the government distance itself from "Netanyahu's crimes in Gaza and the West Bank".

Italian media likened the protests to similar international demonstrations that simultaneously occurred, recognized as the Gen Z protests. Il Fatto Quotidiano criticized the coverage of the strike by the government agencies and "almost all" the daily newspapers, alleging that they focused on events in Milan and exaggerated damage to the Centrale station, but ignored or marginalized the reports of mass assemblies in public urban spaces.

Meloni characterized the 3 October strike, which occurred on a Friday, as a pretext for a long weekend, while Minister of the Interior Matteo Piantedosi stated that CGIL was fuelling a climate of "social unrest". Minister of Transports Matteo Salvini called a for sanctions on "those who strike illegally" after he had declared the strike invalid, and commented "Those are not strikers, those are criminals." CGIL secretary Maurizio Landini and PD leader Elly Schlein defended the strike as a constitutional right.

While taking in part in the Rome demonstration on 29 November, UN Rapporteur Francesca Albanese condemned the attacks on the La Stampa headquarters, however adding that it should be taken as a "warning". Members of the ruling parties criticized her position.

=== Switzerland ===
The Ticino League questioned the cost of pro-Palestinian protests, and condemned the protests and attacks against Ignazio Cassis as well as the alleged "sanctification" of the Sumud Flotilla's crew.

Upon receiving a teachers' plenum letter from the middle school of Viganello addressing the humanitarian crisis in Gaza and the West Bank, the Ticino branch of the Social Democratic Party of Switzerland supported its content. On the other hand, the municipality of Lugano reacted in a hostile manner, drawing criticism from the SDPS.

Whilst the first wave of protests in Ticino in September 2025 seemed to be almost a spillover of Italy's own mobilization, with protests in Italy even having consequences on Swiss transportation, the protests in Ticino slowly started to blend in and join the solidarity movement in the rest of Switzerland, with increasing riots in cities like Bern, Lausanne and Geneva, rather than strictly being part of the Italian protests.

=== Israel ===
The Ministry of Diaspora Affairs and Combating Antisemitism, in co-operation with the J-soc National Center for Combating Antisemitism, closely monitored the 22 September strike and protests, and compiled a detailed dossier on the protests and their participants in both Italy and San Marino, which was published on Israel's official government website by 24 September.

Other dossiers were made regarding the protests on 8 October, 18 October and 23 October. They were given a "risk ranking" ranging from "low" to "high". In the dossier social media accounts related to the protests were also listed and reported, such as: Mezzocannone Occupato, Global Movement To Gaza Campania, K.A.O.S., Collettivo ARGO and Humanity_InFocus.

The Israeli ambassador in Italy at the time of the protests, Jonathan Peled, commented on how the protesters did not advocate for peace, and asked Italy to stop the protests due to them allegedly supporting terrorism.

==== Reactions to the Israeli dossiers ====
The Coordinamento dei Collettivi Autorganizzati Universitari (CAU) defined the dossier "creepy" and questioned the reasons why the Israeli government would produce such a document and record activities of people outside of its national borders, adding that protesters have always been publicly identifiable citizens determined in good faith to stop a genocide.

Kaja Kallas, the Vice-President of the European Commission, released a statement on 18 November 2025, stating that the "EU Commission opposed any attempt at foreign threat or intimidation on the sovereign territory of the Member States," and that included Israel's threats.

=== Palestine ===
News of the protests reached the Gaza Strip and were welcomed with positivity by various Palestinian figures, including writer Eman Abu Zayed.

== See also ==
- List of pro-Palestinian protests in Italy
- 2025 pro-Palestinian protests on university campuses
