= Jorit =

Italian street artist (born 1990)

- Born: Jorit Ciro Cerullo; 24 November 1990 (age 35); Quarto, Italy
- Education: Naples Academy of Fine Arts

Jorit Ciro Cerullo (born 24 November 1990), known mononymously as Jorit, is an Italian street artist. He is known for painting murals depicting faces of people with red streaks on their cheeks.

== Childhood and education ==
Jorit was born in Quarto on the northern perimeter of Naples. His father, Luigi Cerullo, was a Neapolitan and his mother, Jeannina, was Dutch. After studying at the scientific lyceum Galileo Galilei in Naples, he attended the Naples Academy of Fine Arts, obtaining a first class degree.

His interest in street art began when he was 13 years old. Jorit has defined his approach as one of picking out ordinary faces from the working class to embody famous people, in the style of Caravaggio. Thus, his depiction at Forcella, Naples of San Gennaro, the patron saint of Naples, draws on features of a 35-year-old friend who is a factory worker.

== Graffiti artist ==
In the murals made by Jorit there are "hidden" writings, words and phrases that often expand the meaning of the works. They were collected for the first time by Vincenzo De Simone, a Neapolitan psychologist and photographer, as part of the "La gente di Napoli" photoproject.

In 2023, Il Giornale estimated the typical value of a graffiti work by Jorit at €25,000. Jorit earlier won a competition for funding from the Campania region at a value of €300,000.

== Notable street murals ==
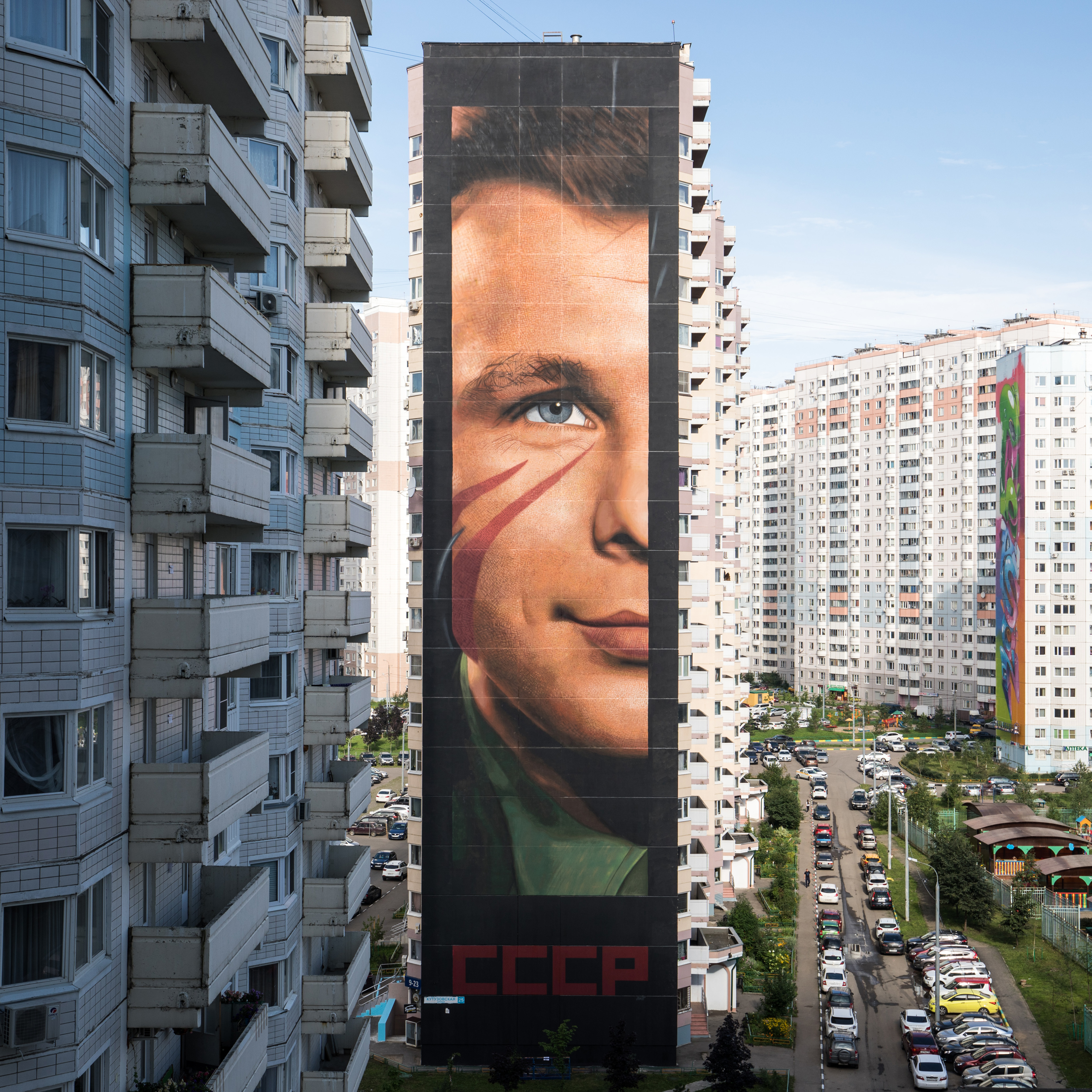
Yuri Gagarin by Jorit, in Odintsovo

In August 2019, Jorit painted the face of the first man in space, Yuri Gagarin, on the facade of a twenty-story building in the district of Odintsovo, Russia. At the base of the mural is "СССР", the abbreviation for the official name of the Soviet Union in the Russian alphabet. It is the largest portrait of Gagarin in the world.

On 22 February 2021, he painted the face of Valerio Verbano on the facade of a building in Tufello, Rome. Verbano was an Italian communist militant, killed in 1980 in an ambush by three fascists who had entered his home.

In Florence, Jorit published a mural depicting the young Antonio Gramsci in 2020. In the wall is Gramsci's words: "Even when all is or seems lost, one must quietly set to work again, starting from the beginning ... The crisis consists precisely in the fact that the old dies and the new cannot be born".

=== Painting in the West Bank and expulsion from Israel ===
Jorit and another artist, Salvatore Tukios, were detained for three days after painting a mural depicting a Palestinian adolescent activist, Ahed Tamimi, who had become an iconic figure among Palestinians after slapping the face of an Israeli soldier outside her home in the West Bank village of Nabi Salih. The mural – whose completion was scheduled to coincide with Tamimi's release from an 8-month prison sentence – was set on the Bethlehem side of Israel's Separation Barrier. Upon their return to Naples on 30 July, their families, waiting at the airport, asked that no photos be taken, as they wished to remain anonymous.

=== Russo-Ukrainian war ===
After Russia's invasion of Ukraine, Jorit stated that Italy should have been supporting the Russian-backed separatists of the Donbas region in Ukraine since 2014.

Jorit made a mural in Naples of Fyodor Dostoevsky, in whose eye is a child in the colours of the Russia-controlled Donetsk People's Republic. He argued that the issue had to be seen from 2014, and that the peoples of the Donbas had self-determined through two referendums, and that children of the two republics had been killed by the Ukrainian army for eight years. His street art was mentioned by Russian president Vladimir Putin during the invasion of Ukraine to illustrate his view that it would be impossible to obliviate Russian culture.

Jorit described a mural of a young girl that he made in July 2023 on a bombed-out building in occupied Mariupol (after a siege that the Red Cross called "apocalyptic"), as seeking to present a narrative of the bombing of the city and its inhabitants by "NATO missiles". He also said the mural was "a living little girl from Donbas who spent her first years in Mariupol surrounded by war". Australian photographer Helen Whittle protested that the mural is based on a photo of her daughter and unauthorized. Jorit later said he had come across the photo by searching on Google for "pigtails", and he had redrawn the shirt and the pigtails. Jorit's mural was criticised on the basis that the bombs that killed children in Mariupol were Russian, and that the Mariupol hospital airstrike was attributed to Russian forces. Critics also questioned the appropriateness of Jorit's mural after Russian forces had previously removed a mural by Sasha Korban in Mariupol that depicted a Ukrainian girl who lost her leg and her mother in an artillery rocket attack by pro-Russian separatist forces in 2015.

== Acknowledgments ==
Jorit was nominated by Michelina Manzillo, Knight of the Italian Republic, for the 2023 Wolf Prize.
