= Tufello =

Quartiere of Rome in Lazio, Italy

- "Quartiere" of Rome
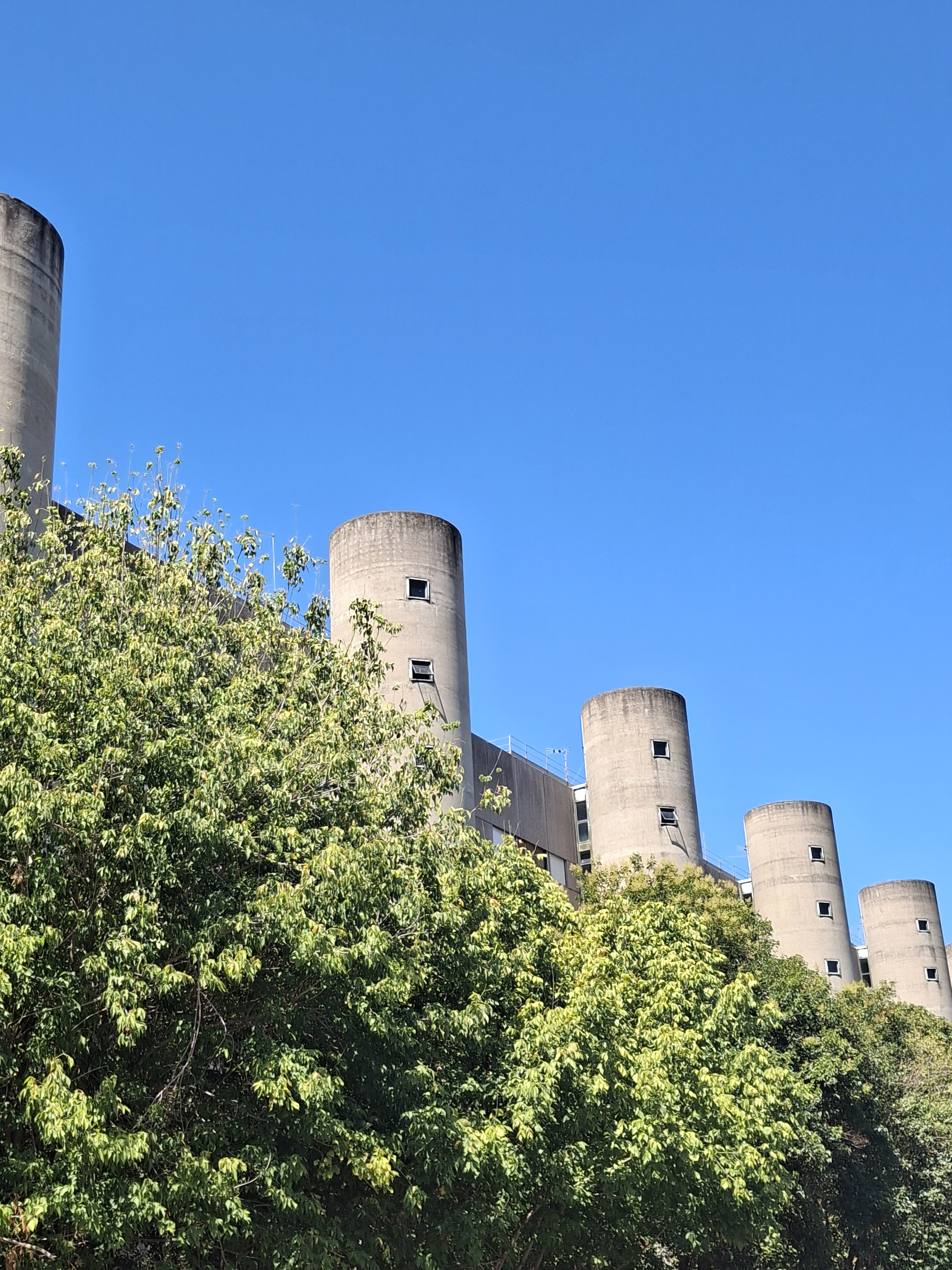
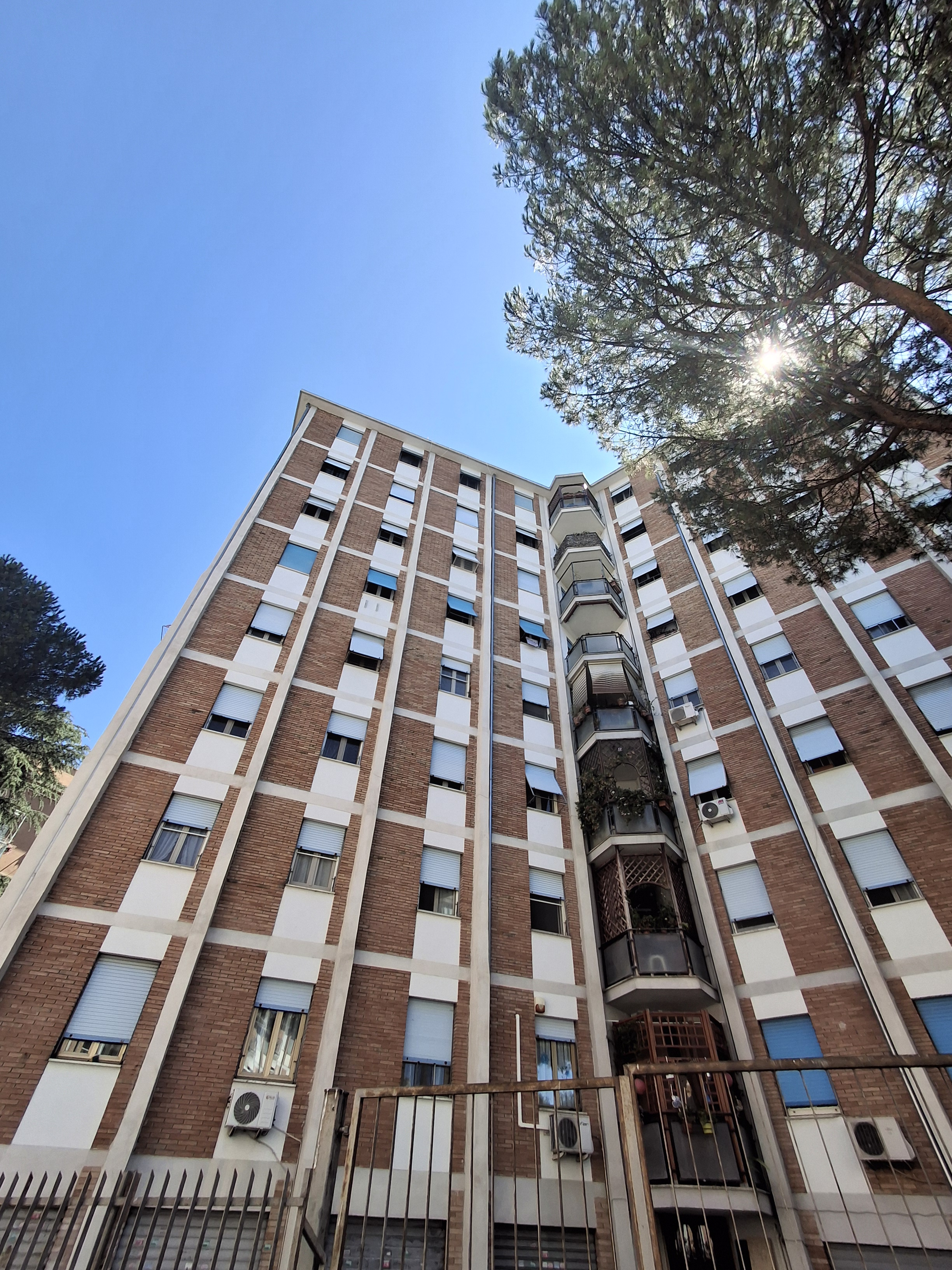
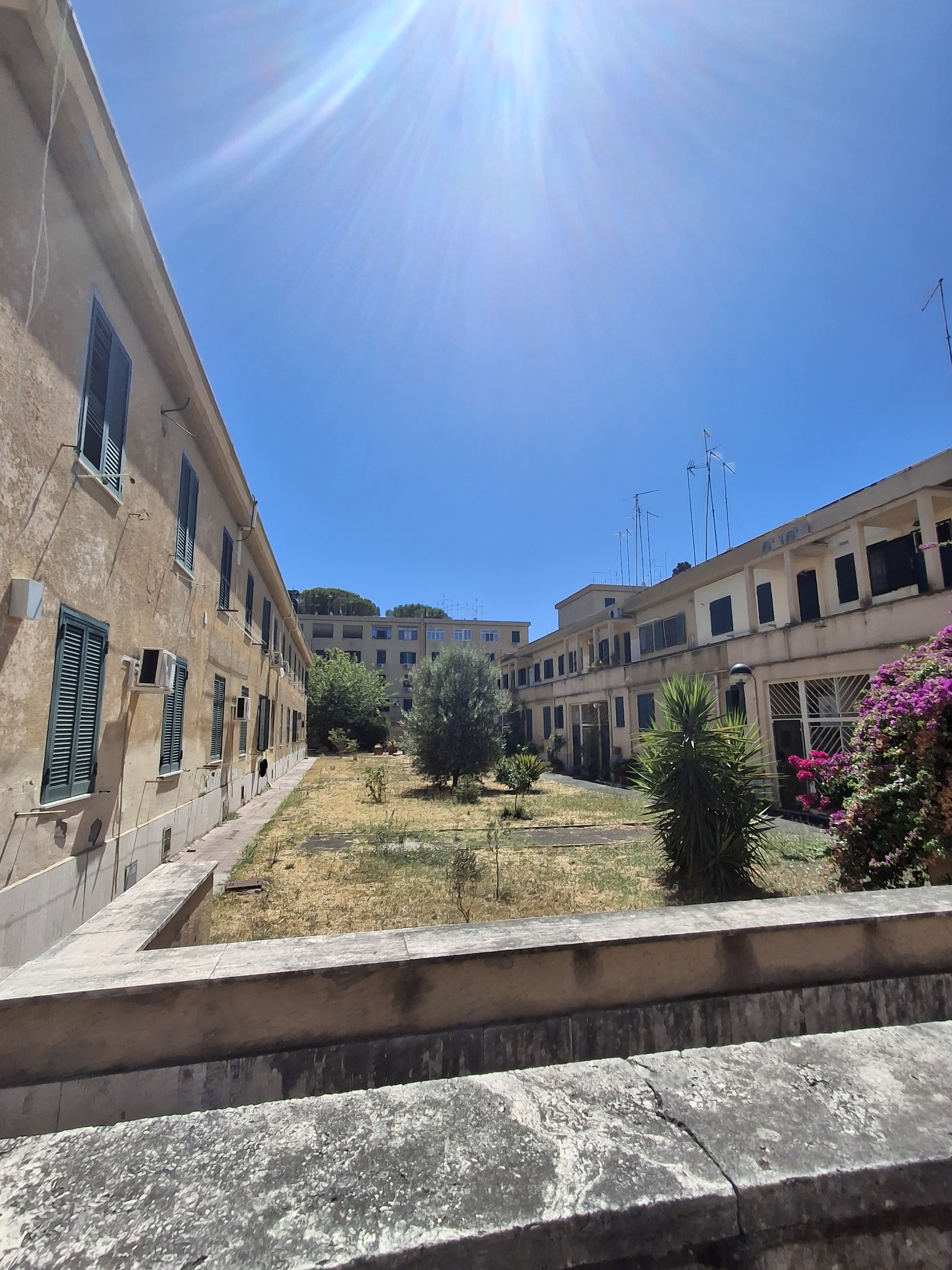
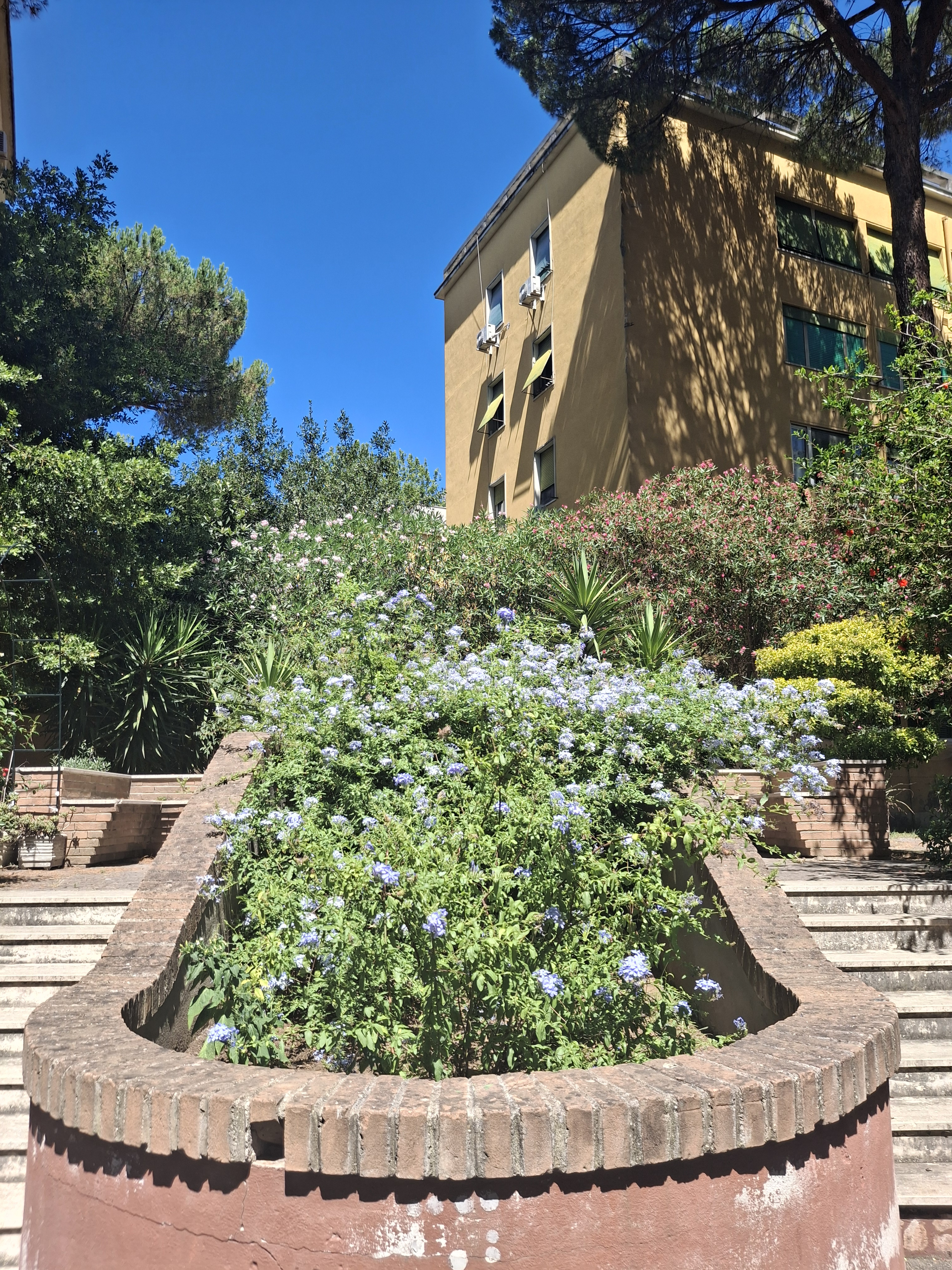
- Motto: Quartiere libero e ribelle (Free and rebellious quarter)
- Position of the quartiere within the city
- Country: Italy
- Region: Lazio
- Province: Rome
- First settled: At least in the 1st Century AD
- First modern urban settlements: 1920s
- Founding: 1939

Area
  - Total: 0.34 sq mi (0.88 km^{2})

Population (2019)
  - Total: 14,181

Tufello is the urban zone "4I" of the Municipio III of the Metropolitan city of Rome. It extends itself onto the Q. XVI Monte Sacro neighbourhood.

The name actually derives from "tufillo", the Italian name for a sedimentary rock which can be extracted from tuff, which is the material that the hills where the "borgata" is located is made of.

== History ==
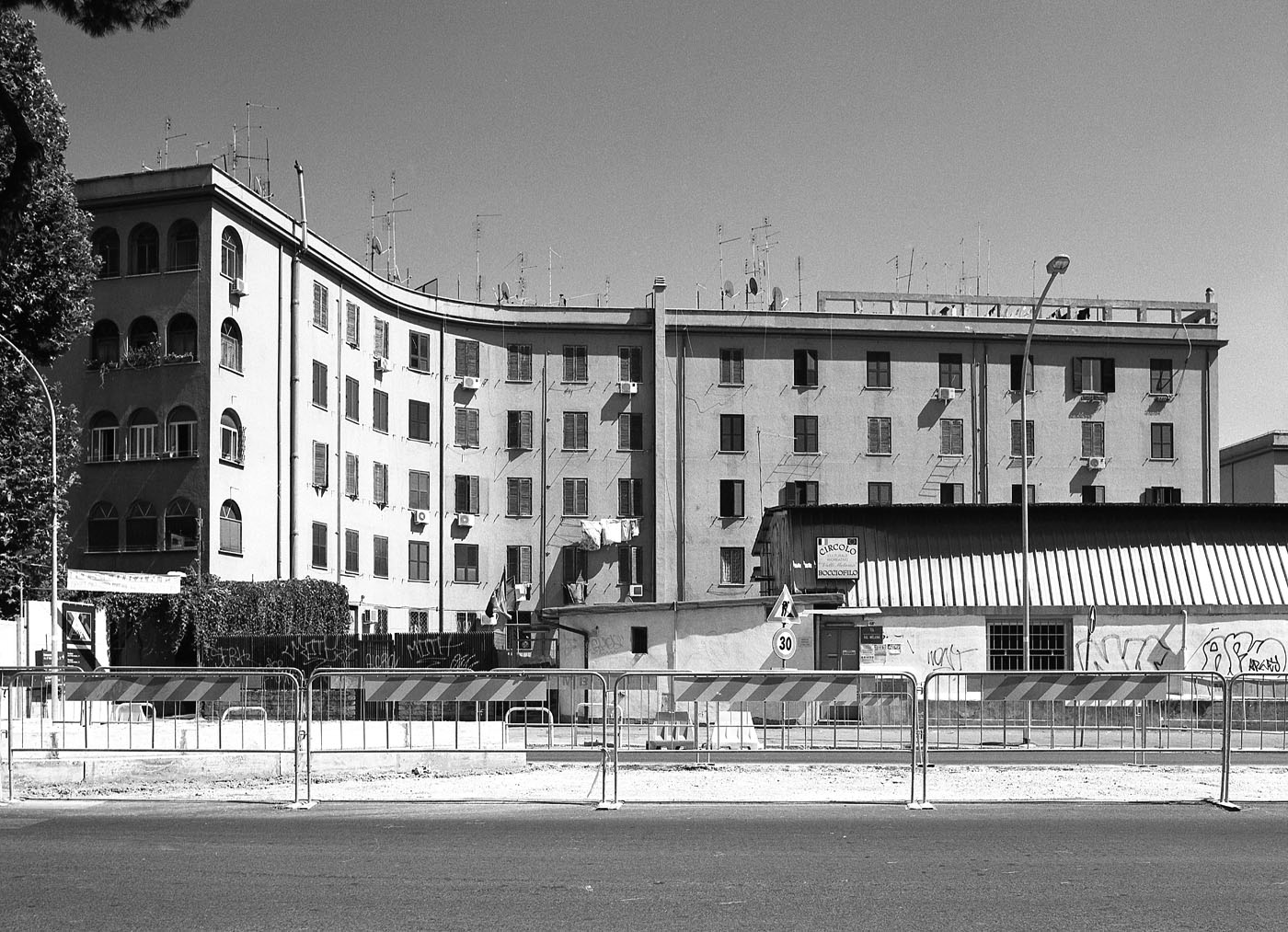
Via Valle Melaina Tufello

=== Ancient History ===
During the Ancient era, under the Roman Empire, the area where Tufello is now located was the same place where the ancient Roman street called "Via Patinaria" passed through, connecting with "Via Nomentana" and "Via Salaria". There used to be various Roman villas in the area, but they mostly remain yet to be excavated as of yet or buried under the current buildings. One of these structures still visible today can be seen at the very outskirt of Tufello, at the border with Vigne Nuove, the villa of Faonte. The fact the villa was inhabited in the 1st Century AD suggests that Tufello was at least first settled around that time.

=== Fascist Period ===
The area, after the Roman Empire, remained mostly an agrarian territory up until the 1920s.

The oldest modern urban buildings in the area, which pre-date the entire "quartiere", are between the streets called "viale Jonio" and "via Capraia", where some buildings that were built in the 1920s can be observed.

The initial urban "emergency" afflicting the area was the presence of local illegal slums, which were to be substituted by new buildings under a project initiated by Benito Mussolini.

Tufello was initially settled by both Italians and French immigrants. The French and the Italian French were nicknamed by the locals as "Francesini" (Little Frenchmen), a nickname tied to their origins. The two story buildings in "via Capraia" were the very first places that immigrants from France occupied, giving them the nickname of the "Francesine" (Little Frenchwomen).

Another significant demographic were the Italian Tunisians and Tunisians, coming from French Tunisia, that settled around the same time as the French immigrants.

It was clear that Tufello was not aimed at the middle class of Rome, but it was aimed towards those from poorer background that were forced to leave their original quarters.

One of the oldest parts of the area was built between 1930 and 1932 under the name of "Stalingrad", (inspired by the, at the time, Soviet city of Stalingrad, today known as Volgograd). The complex of buildings, with up to 534 apartments was built to ease the demographic crisis of Rome at the time. Most of the people that moved to "Stalingrad" were people that once lived in "Spina di Borgo", which was demolished at the time to create what is known today as Via della Conciliazione. The complex was so big that a group of nuns created a kindergarten within the complex in 1932. The area would become a core of significant anti-fascist and partisan activity. Despite various bombings on the complex, all the inhabitants within the complex, and their belongings, were left unharmed; Something that the locals credited to the nearby Virgin Mary statue.

The official founding of the "quartiere" traces its origins in the years of 1939 and 1940, as an "official borgata" for those Italians who came from abroad. The architect of Tufello was P. Sforza.

On 10 September 1943, in the street called "via dei Prati Fiscali" the local inhabitants of Tufello protected the quarter from Nazi occupation using everything they had. Even after their defeat, they continued to sabotage both fascist and German activities up until the end of the war. One of the partisan groups active in the area during the war were "I Caimani del Bell'Orizzonte".

=== Cold War Period ===
After the fall of fascism, the local economy and local development continued.

In 1950, the Santa Maria Assunta al Tufello church was built under the lead of Italian architect Tullio Rossi, giving the area its second church.

The Tufello local market stationed in the main square of the "quartiere" was built in 1958, and is the economic center of the area even today. The market was made by Elena Luzzatto Valentini, the first female Italian architect.

The students movements of 68, and the Years of Lead heavily influenced Tufello, and skirmishes between fascist militias and communist ones were not rare. In 1975, the "Center of Popular Culture" is created with the help of the Italian Communist Party.

Some of the most significant events of this period are the death of Valerio Verbano and Mario Amato.

Whilst the city was mostly affiliated with leftist parties (even hosting a headquarter of the PCI), and still is today, a counter neofascist and fascist phenomenon persisted in the area, and still does today (Neo-Fascist groups active in the area include CasaPound).

Around the 1970s, the area suffered an increase in drugs-related activities.

Pope John Paul II visited Tufello in one of his tours in the Roman "borgate".

=== Recent History ===
The "Ennio Flaviano communal library" (Named after Ennio Flaviano, a writer, journalist, comedian and cinema critic from Monte Sacro) opened up in 2003, becoming a cultural center and hosting up to 20900 books.

In 2010, the construction of the Jonio station was approved, alongside a plan to create a shopping center adjacent to the metro station as a replacement for the demolished commercial building on the site. However, by 2015, when the station was opened, the planned shopping center had not been occupied. As of 2025, the shopping center is yet to open, and the shopkeepers may lose their investment.

In 2011, the neo-fascist group CasaPound occupied a local school (nearby the old house and the grave of Valerio Verbano) that was closed back in 2008, before being kicked out by a mass mobilization by the left-leaning citizens that lived in the surrounding areas and the Italian law enforcement. This happened again in 2021.

Starting from 2019, a project called "Storytelling beyond the Aniene" was initiated by the RiverRun organization and NonTurismo organization, with the support of the Municipio III Roma. The initiative allows tourists and visitors that decide to visit the area to learn the history of Tufello through a series of anectodes by the locals, telling their past and present within the city. This is done thanks to the use of QR codes that can be scanned for free and are scattered around the quarter. This was an attempt to give a voice to the locals, and to slightly boost tourism in an area that is rarely visited by tourists.

During the 2025 Italian general strikes and protests for Gaza, Tufello's inhabitants spontaneously mobilized to protect the local occupied Aristofane high school from any raiders following the raid on a nearby school.

== Geography ==
It's located in the northern outskirts of the city of Rome, between viale Jonio, via di Val Melaina, via Monte Massico, via Monte Resegone, via Monte Si trova nella periferia nord della città, compreso tra viale Jonio, via di Val Melaina, via Monte Massico, via Monte Fumaiolo, via della Bufalotta, via della Cecchina e via Matteo Bandello.

== Monuments and interesting spots ==
=== Civilian architecture ===
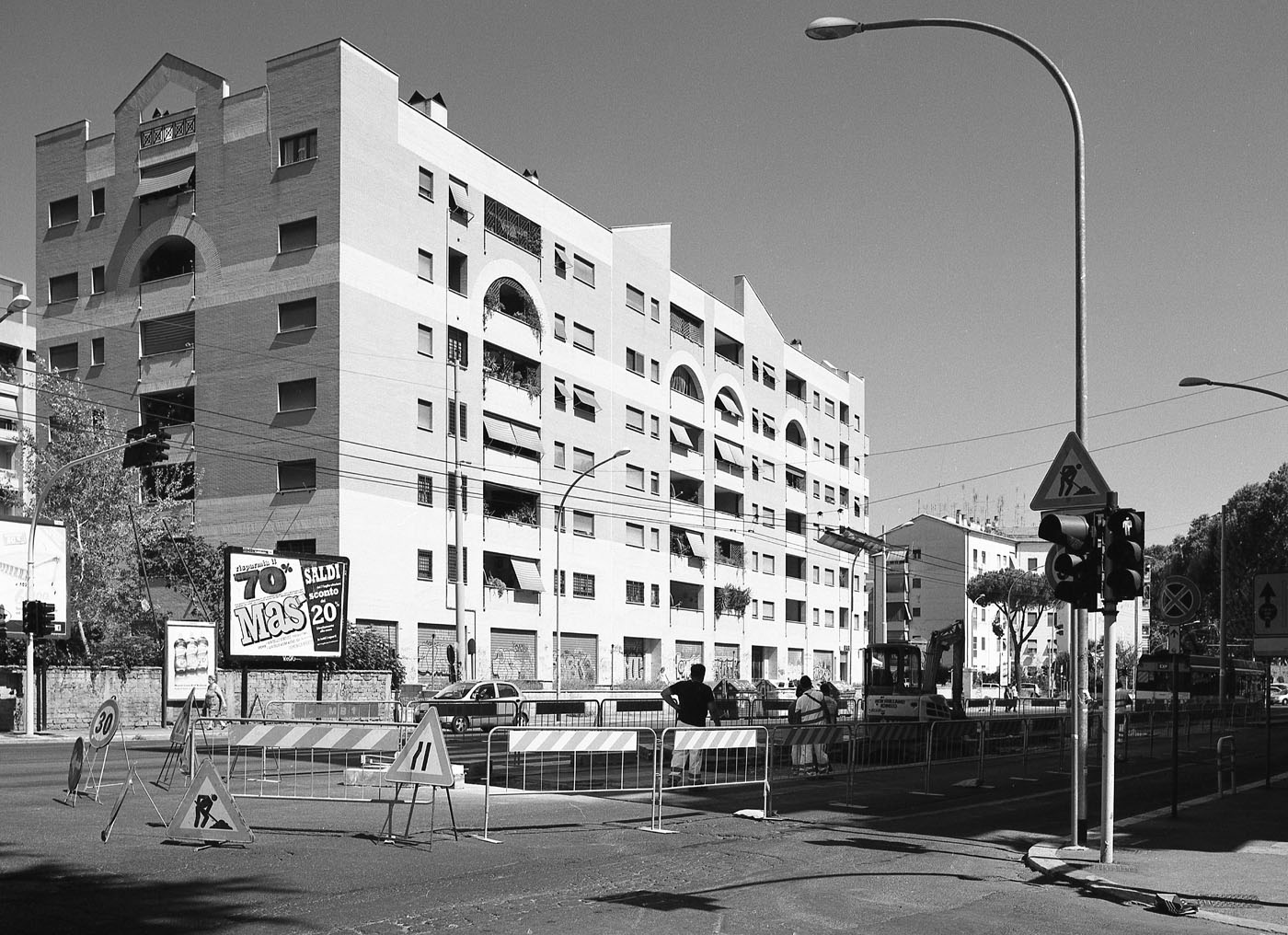
A street known as Via Monte Cervialto (Nuovo Salario)

The architecture, despite being diverse depending on the area, can be divided in two macro-categories with "Via delle Isole Curzonale" being the "border": In the south there are various typical buildings in the style of the early 20th century (due to the fact that the neighbourhood was part of the "Citta' Giardino Aniene" initiative), whilst the northern sectors the buildings have a style that is typical of the 60s and the 70s (Even though, compared to other similar areas in Rome, there are "green areas" in-between the various inhabited complexes).

In the last few years, the entire neighbourhood went through a massive social and urban redevelopment, specifically tied to the redemptions of former council houses. This initiative led to an overall economic and housing price increase, favoured by the position of the area between Monte Sacro and Monte Sacro Alto.

This overall development was also influenced by the presence of some refined buildings' architecture dated back to the 1920s (in the typical style known as "barocchetto romano"), along with the peculiarity of being able to offer local residents to live surrounded by green areas and tranquility (something pretty rare for suburban areas in Rome).

The core of the whole area is the market in "Euganei square". In the street named "via Monte Rochetta" there's also the headquarters of the historic "Municipio III", despite significant functions being transferred back in December 2008 in the new headquarter which is located in "via Umberto Fracchia", in Monte Sacro Alto.

=== Monuments ===
In the road known as "via Capraia" there is a statue in honour of Magistrate Mario Amato. Mario Amato studied the link between neofascist terrorism and criminal organizations such as the local "Banda della Magliana". On 23 June 1980, Mario Amato was shot and killed by the Nuclei Armati Rivoluzionari.

=== Plaques ===
There is a plaque in honour of some of Tufello's anti-fascist militants: Riziero Fantini, Filippo Rocchi, Renzo Piasco e Antonio Pistonesi, who were killed by the fascist regime and the nazi regime. All were victims of the Ardeatine massacre. The plaque is located in "Via Scarpanto".

Another significant plaque is placed in honour of the local "Ursuline Sisters of San Girolamo in Somasca order", which built in 1932 a kindergarten in the Stalingrad complex.

Near the Santissimo Redentore a Val Melaina church, there is a plaque coined by the "Il Civico Giusto" organization in honour of the local parish priest and deputy parish priest who protected local anti-fascists throughout the 1940s, including Emilio Colombo, who'd then become a European MEP.

=== Religious infrastructures ===
- Santissimo Redentore a Val Melaina, in via del Gran Paradiso.
- Church of Santa Maria Assunta al Tufello, in via Capraia.

=== Street painting ===
Thanks to a donation by Bloomberg Philanthropies, Municipio III of Roma managed to fund an effort of street painting, the first in the whole of Rome, transforming the road in an urban school accessible by the adjacent schools and library.

== Street Art ==
=== Graffitis ===
Alongside the various murals there are also various graffitis in the area done over the years by what are called "writer gangs" by some outlets, such as "Diario Romano". The majority of these graffiti are political, relating especially to political ideologies such as communism and socialism.

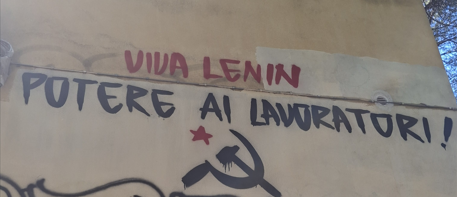
An example of a political graffiti in Tufello (Translation: Glory to Lenin, power to the workers", followed by the depiction of an hammer and sickle ).

=== Murals against homophobia ===
Pixel art artist "Krayon" made a mural on the walls of the Jonio metro station which showcased two lesbian women kissing and below it the number for the Gay Helpline (800.713.713). Notably, it was the very first mural of its kind in the entirety of Italy, according to RomaToday. The mural is located next to the site where a gay man, named Paolo Seganti, was killed in 2005.

=== Murals against the mafia ===
In 2023, the students of the local "Aristofane highschool" created a mural of Giuseppe Impastato who was killed on 9 May 1978 by Cosa Nostra. The mural was supposed to be made in 2020, however, it was delayed after the COVID-19 pandemic.

=== Murals of famous actors ===
In the street named "via Tonale", angle "via Capraia", a mural dedicated to Gigi Proietti was made by street artist Lucamaleonte. The mural is 15 meters high and is drawn on the wall of a palace that is located in front of a street. There are multiple murals about the actor scattered around the area.

A mural of Vittorio De Sica is present, honouring one of his movies "Bicycle Thieves", featuring Tufello.

=== Political Murals ===
There is a murals in honour of Valerio Verbano, a left-wing revolutionary who was killed in 1980 in his parents' home by a group of three armed fascist militants. The mural was made by famous mural artist Jorit.

Another political mural is located just outside the "Valerio Verbano gym", and showcases Bobby Sands, a provvisional IRA member that died after a 66-day protest fasting. The mural was also made by Jorit.

Another mural on the walls of the "Valerio Verbano gym" showcases a replica of a photo done by John Dominis during the 1968 Olympics Games. It symbolizes those who have fought for the rights of people of colour within the United States of America.

Towards the outskirts of Tufello there is a mural about the Bolivian Revolution made by some Venezuelan artists named Rommer, Ronald, Javier e Wolfgang.

=== Other Murals ===
A mural of a woman by Alice Pasquini can be found in the street named "via Monte Meta".

A mural of Spiderman, made by Virginio Vona, a famous artist in both Italy and France, was located on the side of the main market for over three decades, becoming a symbol of the quarter. However, in 2017, it was mistakenly removed, enraging both the artist and the locals.

Giacomo Bevilacqua (Known as "Sio") created a 50m² mural-comic of one of his original characters, named "Panda", from his comic series "A Panda piace".

An extremely rare and early work stencil graffiti mural by Hogre can be found in Tufello. The only one left standing in Rome of a significant size and importance.

== Demography ==
In 2001, the population of Tufello was 16.570, however, by 2019, the population had decreased by 14,4%. This meant that by 2019, the population of Tufello was 14.181. Amongst these, up to 9% of the population are migrants, making the migrant population around 1276 people. (not counting the historic "Francesini" or Tunisian groups).

The average age of Tufello is 48, and only 10,4% of the population has a university degree.

== Sport ==
=== Football ===
Tufello is represented by three football squads: the "ASD Polisportiva Tirreno", founded in 1945, present in the "Prima Categoria" league, the "U.S. Tufello 1963", founded in 1963, present within the E rank of Lazio's "Seconda Categoria" league and the "ASC.D Virtus Vigne Nuove", present within the G rank of the "Giovanissimi" roman league.

== Transportation ==
Tufello is easily reachable thanks to the Jonio metro station.

== Pop culture ==
- A rapper known as Rancore dedicated a song to Tufello, named "Tufello".
- The movie "Bicycle Thieves" shows various parts of Tufello in many of its scenes.
- The movie "Familia", made by Francesco Costabile, was filmed in Tufello.
- Many of the scenes of the movie "Gloria - Il ritorno" (English: "Glory - The return") took place in Tufello.

== Read further ==
- Invito al Tufello e Montesacro. Dal giardino in città alla città in campagna. Roma: Fratelli Palombi. 1999. ISBN 978-88-7621-696-1.
- Luciano Villani (2012). Le borgate del fascismo. Storia urbana, politica e sociale della periferia romana. Milano: Ledizioni. ISBN 978-88-6705-014-7.
- Paolo Petaccia (2016). Borgate. L'utopia razional-popolare. Roma Capitale. Roma: Officina Edizioni. ISBN 978-88-6049-194-7.

== See also ==
- Years of lead
- Fascism in Italy
- Fascist architecture
- Monte Sacro
