= Tufello Local Market =

Main market of Tufello and local landmark

- Mercato Rionale del Tufello; Mercato Tufello; Mercato di piazzale degli Euganei

- The Tufello Local Market in June 2025
- Location: Tufello, Rome, Republic of Italy
- Coordinates: 41°56′57.71″N 12°31′57.7″E
- Opened: 1958
- Architect: Elena Luzzatto Valentini
- Num. of stores: 26
- Floors: 1

The Tufello Local Market, also known as the Tufello Market or Market of Piazzale degli Euganei, is an active market in Tufello, a quarter of Rome. It was constructed in 1958 by Italian architect Elena Luzzatto Valentini. The market over the years has become a nest for socialization within the community of Tufello, and in the 2020s it has faced various renovations and plans for further changes to its architecture have been scheduled as of 2026.

== History ==
=== Origins ===
In 1958, Elena Luzzatto directed the construction of the local market. It soon became central to the local economy and daily life within the quarter due to its position near via delle Isole Curzolane.

=== Later evolution ===
Over the years, the market evolved into more than just a place for commerce, becoming a social hub for the Tufello community, especially after 2023, when a renovation led by Municipio III of Roma Capitale resulted in the creation of a dedicated social space at the market’s entrance. The initiative was framed as a way to further enhance the market's economic value, make the market cleaner and to enhance Tufello's cultural and historical context more.

The market also started to host events such as "Dancescreen in the Market" and "Author Meetings" which are held periodically. The Christian Associations of Italian Workers declared the market an official landmark in their project "The island that exists, walking through the suburbs", citing its historical value for the quarter and the important social value it brings to the local community; The association used the adjacent area as to set up help centers for the community of Tufello.

Following the death of Gigi Proietti, the locals supported a petition to name the market after him, which gained some traction in Municipio III itself.

Despite renovation efforts aimed at improving the market, a 2024 investigation by Roma Capitale found that it had the highest number of unused stalls in Rome, with only 39 of the 71 available spaces occupied for commercial use after the renovation.

A 2025 evaluation by Mercati D'Autori identified 26 active commercial operators in the market.

== Street art ==
In October 2017, the quarter was enraged when a historical mural of Spider-Man made by artist Virginio Vona was removed mistakenly by the assesor of Municipio III. Vona himself commented negatively on the event, stating that his own place of origin did not respect his arts. The locals went as far as officially voicing their anger to Municipio III itself.

After the death of Gigi Proietti, a mural to commemorate him was erected on the side of the market.

== Future plans ==
In 2026, a project to further renovate and modernize the market, significantly changing its architecture, was launched. A new logo for the market was made and a 3D rendering of the project was sent to Municipio III for approval.
