= Sasha Korban =

Ukrainian graffiti artist

- Born: 12 March 1987
- Occupation: Graffiti artist
- Works: Milana (mural)

Sasha Korban is a Ukrainian graffiti artist. His 2018 Mariupol mural of Milana Abdurashytova, a 3-year-old girl who survived a missile attack by pro-Russian forces, was destroyed in 2022 during the Russian occupation of Mariupol.

== Childhood and youth ==
Korban was born 12 March 1987 in Kirovsk in Donetsk Oblast in Ukraine.

== Mining ==
Korban worked in the Komsomolets Donbasu coal mine from 2006 to 2011.

== Graffiti artist ==
Sky Art Foundation describes Korban's interest in street art as mainly starting in 2009.

=== Milana mural ===
In September 2018, Korban painted a mural of Milana Abdurashytova on a 15-floor building in Mariupol. Abdurashytova and her mother had been hit by a missile strike launched by pro-Russian forces in 2015. Abdurashytova's mother shielded her, dying as a result but saving Abdurashytova's life. One of Abdurashytova's legs was amputated. Abdurashytova received rehabilitation support from the Rinat Akhmetov Foundation. Korban's mural, known as Milana, became a symbol for Mariupol residents.

Korban described Abdurashytova as "stronger than any war", having a "little and yet brave heart [that] conquered everything", and as "a real symbol of true hope". Street Art United States described Abdurashytova's face in the mural as "exemplif[ying] Korban's signature style of expressive faces, almost narrative in their realism". It described Milana as "embod[ying] a proud stoicism standing against disaster ... [Abdurashytova] does not exhibit fear, but serenity."

After the 24 February 2022 full-scale Russian invasion of Ukraine, the Milana mural was painted over during the Russian occupation of Mariupol. During the occupation, a mural of an Australian girl was also painted in Mariupol by Italian artist Jorit. Il Giornale and the Italian investigative journalism site Valigia Blu criticised Jorit's mural, on the grounds that the artist described it as relating to "NATO missiles", while the bombs that killed children in Mariupol were Russian, and in relation to Korban's destroyed mural.

=== Other works ===
In April 2021, Korban created a mural, A little magic, under a bridge in Kyiv.

In late 2022, on a building opposite the Russian embassy in Tbilisi, Korban painted a mural of a woman wearing traditional clothing. The mural was part of the 2022 Tbilisi Mural Fest and seen as a symbol of the Russian invasion of Ukraine.
