= List of pro-Palestinian protests in Italy =

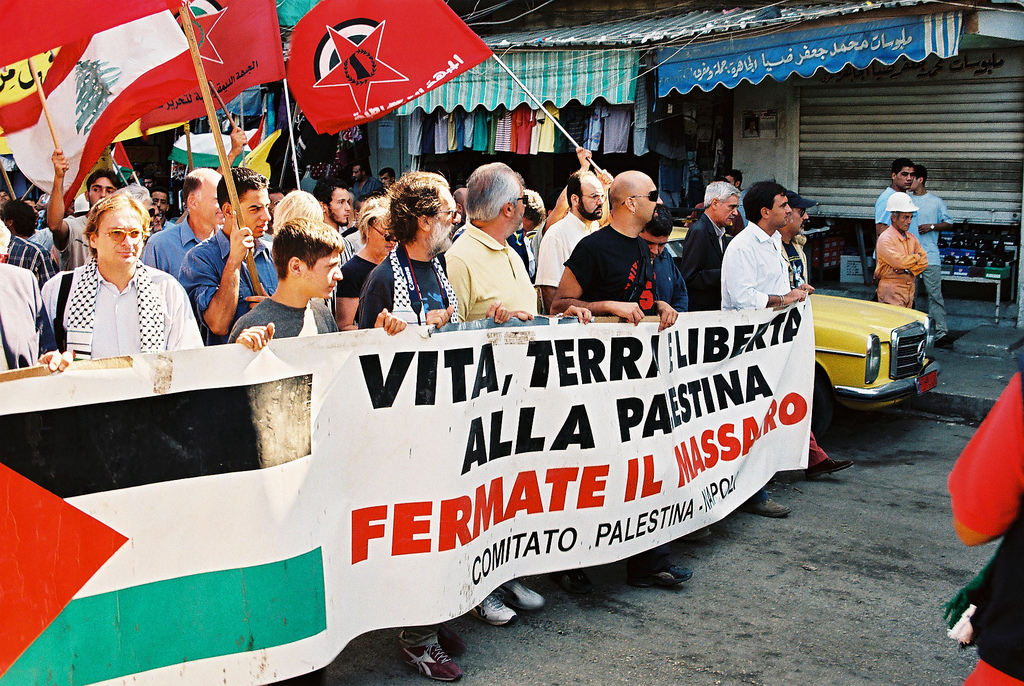
March in Italy in commemoration of the Sabra and Shatila massacre.

This is a list of pro-Palestinian protests in Italy including demonstrations, marches, sit-ins, direct actions, and campus encampments in support of Palestinian rights.

== List ==
Estimated attendance is either mentioned explicitly in the references or a midpoint is used, i.e., 50 when dozens are mentioned, 500 when hundreds are mentioned, and so on.

=== Pre-2023 ===
Date	City/town	Estimated attendance	Description	Ref(s)
18 November 2006	Rome and Milan	50,000	The protests were against the arms sale to Israel, against apartheid, and against military cooperation with the nation. The dual protest was sponsored by several political parties, such as Federation of the Greens, Communist Refoundation Party, Democrats of the Left, Workers' Communist Party, and Party of Italian Communists. The protest stirred nationwide condemnation and strengthened support for Israel after the participants publicly burnt three cloth mannequins draped with an Israeli, a US, and an Italian flag in front of the monument to the Unknown Soldier.	
17 January 2009	Rome	82,500 (Note: Organizers state 150,000 and the police 15,000, so a midpoint is used here.)	Demonstration and march through the city center. Protesters chanted against George W. Bush and Ehud Barak.	
27 September 2014	Rome	5,000	Demonstration and march through the city center.	
27 May 2018	Rome	150	Demonstration against Israel's participation in the 2018 Giro d'Italia cycling competition and against Jerusalem having hosted the start of the race earlier that month. Some protesters attempted to disrupt the passage of the cyclists. Ended with police intervention. Seven protesters were arrested. Dozens of protesters and two police officers were injured.	
13 May 2021	Milan	5,000	Demonstration and march through the city center.	
14 May 2021	Livorno	?	Temporary blocking of a shipment containing weapons and explosives destined to Ashdod port.	
15 May 2021	Multiple	?	Demonstrations in the city centers.	
15 May 2021	Rome	1,000	Demonstration and march through the city center.	
15 May 2021	Venice	50	Demonstration in the city center.	

=== 2023 ===
Date	City/town	Estimated attendance	Description	Ref(s)
13 October 2023	Naples	?	Demonstration and march through the city center.	
13 October 2023	Rome	5,000	Demonstration and march through the city center.	
21 October 2023	Rome	500	Demonstration and march through the city center.	
17 November 2023	Pisa	?	Demonstration in the city center. Protesters unfurled a large Palestinian flag on the Leaning Tower of Pisa.	

=== 2024 ===
Date	City/town	Estimated attendance	Description	Ref(s)
27 January 2024	Milan	?	Demonstration in the city center during the International Holocaust Remembrance Day. Ended with police intervention.	
13 February 2024	Naples	?	Demonstration in front of the offices of RAI. Ended with police intervention.	
23 February 2024	Florence	?	Demonstration and march through the city center. Ended with police intervention. Several protesters were injured. Videos of police officers beating young students went viral online and sparked an investigation into the violence.	
23 February 2024	Pisa	?	Demonstration and march through the city center. Ended with police intervention. Several protesters were injured, including some being taken to the hospital in ambulances.	
15 March 2024	Naples	?	Demonstration at the Engineering Faculty of the Politecnico di Napoli.	
19 March 2024	Turin	?	Disruption of a session of the Academic Senate in protest of the university ties with Israel.	
14 April 2024	Rome	?	Encampment at the Sapienza University of Rome. Lasted until at least 17 April.	
16 April 2024	Rome	300	Attempted occupation of the Rector's Office at the Sapienza University of Rome. Ended with police intervention. Two protesters were arrested.	
17 April 2024	Rome	?	Demonstration in front of the Rome Courthouse in Piazzale Clodio in solidarity with protesters arrested the previous day.	
17 April 2024	Rome	?	Hunger strike by students of the Sapienza University of Rome as part of the ongoing encampment there.	
5 May 2024	Bologna	?	Encampment at the University of Bologna.	
10 May 2024	Milan	?	Encampment at the University of Milan.	
10 May 2024	Padua	?	Encampment at the University of Padua. Lasted until at least 15 May.	
13 May 2024	Pisa	?	Encampment at the University of Pisa.	
13 May 2024	Venice	40	Encampment at the Ca' Foscari University.	
13 May 2024	Siena	50	Encampment at the University of Siena.	
15 May 2024	Genoa	?	Encampment at the University of Genoa.	
15 May 2024	Parma	?	Encampment at the University of Parma.	
15 May 2024	Bari	?	Encampment at the University of Bari.	
15 May 2024	Palermo	?	Encampment at the University of Palermo.	
15 May 2024	Macerata	?	Encampment at the University of Macerata.	
15 May 2024	Florence	400	Encampment at the University of Florence.	
16 May 2024	Turin	?	Encampment at the University of Turin.	
17 May 2024	Trento	?	Encampment at the University of Trento.	
28 May 2024	Bologna	500	Occupation of train tracks at the train station.	
5 June 2024	Milan	?	Demonstration in the city center. Protesters unfurled a large Palestinian flag on top of the Milan Cathedral.	
21 September 2024	Rome	4,000	Demonstration and march through the city center.	
5 October 2024	Rome	5,000	Demonstration in the city center despite ban imposed by the government. Ended with police intervention. At least 34 protesters were injured.	
15 October 2024	Bologna	3,000	Demonstration and march through the city center. Protesters also showed solidarity with Lebanese victims of the Israeli invasion.	
13 November 2024	Turin	100	Occupation of defence company Leonardo Turin headquarters. Some protesters climbed on top of a plane in the grounds of the company.	
15 November 2024	Turin	400	Demonstration and march through the city center. Ended with police intervention. Several protesters and police officers were injured.	

=== 2025 ===
Date	City/town	Estimated attendance	Description	Ref(s)
18 March 2025	Bologna	400	Demonstration and march through the city center. Ended with police intervention.	
29 March 2025	Rome	?	Demonstration and march through the city center.	
13 April 2025	Milan	10,000	Demonstration and march through the city center. Ended with police intervention. Seven protesters were arrested.	
17 May 2025	Rome	100	Demonstration and march through the city center.	
21 May 2025	Rome	50	Demonstration in the city center.	
26 May 2025	Rome	6	Disruption of a public shareholder's meeting at the defence company Leonardo Rome headquarters.	
31 May 2025	Rome	500	Encampment of the Piazza Numa Pompilio in protest of Israel's participation in the cycling competition 2025 Giro d'Italia.	
31 May 2025	Rome	150,000	Demonstration and march through the city center.	
7 June 2025	Rome	300,000	Demonstration and march through the city center.	
21 June 2025	Rome	100,000	Demonstration and march through the city center.	
30 August 2025	Venice	5,000	Demonstration and march through the city center during the 82nd Venice International Film Festival.	
22 September 2025	Rome	1,200	March through the city center organized by a group called “Priests Against Genocide”.	
22 September 2025	Multiple	100,000 - 500,000	Nationwide strike in over 75 municipalities. At least 18 protesters were arrested. Several dozens were injured, including police officers. Dockworkers in Genoa, La Spezia, Ravenna, Trieste, Venice, and Livorno halted all arms transfers to Israel.	
24 September 2025	Milan	?	Demonstration outside the Milan Courthouse in support of a La Scala worker that was fired for screaming "Free Palestine".	
24 September 2025	Bologna	5,000	Demonstration in the city center in protest of the attacks to the Global Sumud Flotilla.	
27 September 2025	Genoa	25,000	Demonstration and march through the city center. Blocking by dockworkers of containers with explosives and hazardous materials headed for Israel.	
1 October 2025	Naples	?	Blocking of rail traffic at the Napoli Centrale railway station in response to Israel's interception and kidnapping of activists on board of the Global Sumud Flotilla.	
2 October 2025	Milan	80,000	Demonstration in solidarity of the Global Sumud Flotilla being intercepted by Israel. Protestors carried a banner reading: "Free Palestine, Stop the War Machine”.	
2 October 2025	Rome	10,000	Demonstration outside the Roma Termini railway station in response to Israel's interception and kidnapping of activists on board of the Global Sumud Flotilla.	
3 October 2025	Naples	10,000	Blocking of the Naples port.	
3 October 2025	Genoa	40,000	March from the ferry terminal to the city center.	
3 October 2025	Milan	50,000-100,000	Demonstration in the city center.	
4 October 2025	Rome	250,000-1,000,000	Demonstration and march through the city center. Two cars and trash bins were set on fire. Met with police intervention.	
5 October 2025	Rome	250,000	Demonstration against Israel's interception of the boats and demand the release of the activists.	
8 October 2025	Milan	5,000	Demonstration and march through the city center. Protesters blocked car traffic.	
24 October 2025	Rome	500-1,000	Demonstration and march towards the Israeli Embassy and the Rome Film Festival. Ended with police intervention including the use of water cannons against the protesters.	
28 November 2025	Milan	?	General strike for Palestine. Several flights were canceled.	
28 November 2025	Venice	?	Blocking of the entrance to the offices of defense company Leonardo. Ended with police intervention, including the use of water cannons.	
28 November 2025	Turin	500	Demonstration and march through the city center.	
28 November 2025	Genoa	5,000	General strike for Palestine and march through the city center.	

=== 2026 ===
Date	City/town	Estimated attendance	Description	Ref(s)
7 January 2026	Milan	10,000	Several pro-Palestinian groups protested against the environmental and financial impact of 2026 Winter Olympics, denouncing Israel's participation as well as demanding Israel to be excluded from the games.	
5 February 2026	Milan	100	Demonstration outside of the University of Milan to protest against Israel's participation in the 2026 Winter Olympics.	
2 April 2026	Milan	500	Demonstration near the Duomo Cathedral against the Israeli parliament passing a law imposing the death penalty for Palestinians.	
30 April 2026	Milan	1,000	Demonstration in the city center in protest of the latest Israeli attack on Global Sumud Flotilla.	
10 October 2026	Cagliari	6,000	Demonstration and march through the city center.	
10 October 2026	Sassari	?	Demonstration and march through the city center.	
10 October 2026	Milan	5,000	Demonstrations and march through the city center.	
10 October 2026	Bologna	100+	Demonstration in the city center.	
10 October 2026	Turin	15,000	Several protestors carried and burned puppets of Donald Trump and Benjamin Netanyahu during a march in the city.	
10 October 2026	Rome	20,000	Demonstration and march from the Colosseum to Piazzale Aldo Moro.	
10 October 2026	Alessandria	1,000+	Demonstration in the city center, with protestors carried a sheet paper containing the names of 18,457 children who were killed in Gaza between October 2023 and July 2025.	

== See also ==
- Gaza war protests
- Boycott, Divestment, and Sanctions
- Lists of pro-Palestinian protests
