= Network of Communists =

Italian political network, founded in 1998

Network of Communists Rete dei Comunisti
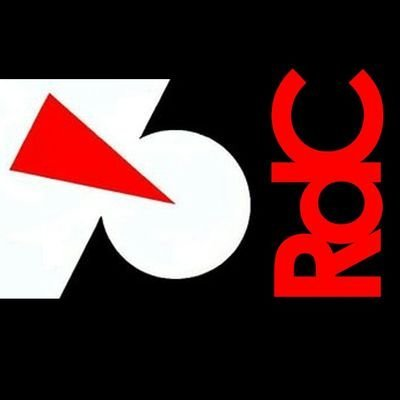
- Abbreviation: RdC
- Leader: Collective leadership
- Founded: 13 September 1998
- Newspaper: Contropiano
- Student wing: Cambiare Rotta; OSA - Opposizione Studentesca d'Alternativa
- Ideology: Communism; Anti-capitalism; Hard Euroscepticism
- National affiliation: Federation of the Left (2009); Power to the People! (2017-)
- Chamber of Deputies: 0 / 630
- Senate: 0 / 315
- European Parliament: 0 / 76

Website
- www.retedeicomunisti.net

The Network of Communists (Italian: Rete dei Comunisti, RdC) is a communist political movement network, founded in Bologna on 13 September 1998.

== History ==
The RdC was born initially from the union of the Communists Forum with the association Communist Initiative of the Emilia-Romagna, the association In Movement for a Communist Project of Milano, the Communist Collective Rosa Luxemburg of Aversa and the Communist Circle of Trivero street of Torino.

In the May 2000 the RdC is cofounder of the Communist Coordination, together with the Movement for the Confederation of Communist, The Other Lombardia-Head Up, the Communist Coordination of Napoli and the Cultural Centre The Worker of Massa Carrara and La Spezia, but the experience fell apart during 2001 and the RdC regained full autonomy.

From June 2009 the RdC joined the Federation of the Left, leaving it in the following December, judging the FdS not autonomous enough from the Democratic Party.

In the March 2013 Sergio Cararo is one of the signatories of the Declaration for an anti-capitalist and libertarian movement. On its basis was formed the Ross@ association, and many members of RdC joined it.

In June 2016 Mauro Casadio signed, as member of the RdC secretariat, the Appeal for an alternative to the diktats of the European Union. From it was born the social platform Eurostop, of which the RdC is still member.

From 2017, together with Eurostop, the RdC joined Power to the People!.

== Organization ==
The activity of the RdC is focused on three areas:

- Research on class composition, Marxist theory and international issue through inquiries, essays and books (the RdC has a specific magazine about Southern America, Nuestra America, and it has a publishing house, I quaderni di Contropiano).
- Direct activity of militants in grassroots trade unionism.
- Direct participation to different structures of international solidarity, anti-militarist, cultural and of information. It also participates to a series of local experiences, linked to the independent left.

The RdC is linked to two students organization: Cambiare Rotta - Organizzazione Giovanile Comunista (for the university students) and OSA - Opposizione Studentesca d'Alternativa (for the middle students).

== Press ==
The official press of the RdC is Contropiano, communist newspaper founded in 1993.

== National assemblies ==
- I assembly - Roma, 23 March 2002
- II assembly - Roma, 10–11 March 2007
- III assembly - Roma, 2–3 April 2011

== Election results ==
Election		Votes	%	Seats
2018	Chamber of Deputies	In PaP!		0 / 630
2018	Senate	In PaP!		0 / 315
