= Official names of the Soviet Union =

The official names of the Soviet Union, officially known as the Union of Soviet Socialist Republics, in the languages of the Soviet Republics (presented in the constitutional order) and other languages of the USSR, were as follows.

== Official republic-level languages ==
Language	Abbreviation	Full name	Short name
Russian	СССР (SSSR)	Союз Советских Социалистических Республик (Soyuz Sovetskikh Sotsialisticheskikh Respublik; BGN/PCGN) (Sojuz Sovetskix Socialističeskix Respublik; Scientific)	Советский Союз (Sovetskiy Soyuz; BGN/PCGN) (Sovetskij Sojuz; Scientific)
Ukrainian	СРСР (SRSR)	Союз Радянських Соціалістичних Республік (Soyuz Radyansʹkykh Sotsialistychnykh Respublik; BGN/PCGN) (Sojuz Radianśkych Socialistyčnych Respublik; Scientific)	Радянський Союз (Radyansʹkyy Soyuz; BGN/PCGN) (Radianśkyj Sojuz; Scientific)
Belarusian	СССР (SSSR)	Саюз Савецкіх Сацыялістычных Рэспублік (Sayuz Savyetskikh Satsyyalistychnykh Respublik; BGN/PGCN) (Sajuz Savieckich Sacyjalistyčnych Respublik; Łacinka)	Савецкі Саюз (Savyetski Sayuz; BGN/PGCN) (Saviecki Sajuz; Łacinka)
Uzbek	ССРИ (SSRI)	Совет Социалистик Республикалари Иттифоқи (Sovet Sotsialistik Respublikalari Ittifoqi)	Совет Иттифоқи (Sovet Ittifoqi)
Kazakh	ССРО (SSRO)	Советтік Социалистік Республикалар Одағы (Sovettık Sotsialistık Respublikalar Odağy)	Советтер Одағы (Sovetter Odağy)
Georgian	სსრკ (ssrk’)	საბჭოთა სოციალისტური რესპუბლიკების კავშირი (sabch’ota sotsialist’uri resp’ublik’ebis k’avshiri)	საბჭოთა კავშირი (sabch’ota k’avshiri)
Azerbaijani	ССРИ (SSRİ)	Совет Сосиалист Республикалары Иттифагы (Sovet Sosialist Respublikaları İttifaqı)	Совет Иттифагы (Sovet İttifaqı)
Lithuanian	TSRS	Tarybų Socialistinių Respublikų Sąjunga	Tarybų Sąjunga
Moldavian (Cyrillic Romanian)	УРСС (URSS)	Униуня Републичилор Советиче Сочиалисте (Uniunea Republicilor Sovietice Socialiste)	Униуня Советикэ (Uniunea Sovieticǎ)
Latvian	PSRS	Padomju Sociālistisko Republiku Savienība	Padomju Savienība
Kirghiz	ССРС (SSRS)	Советтик Социалисттик Республикалар Союзу (Sovettik Sotsialisttik Respublikalar Soyuzu)	Советтер Союзу (Sovetter Soyuzu)
Tajik	ИҶШС (IJShS)	Иттиҳоди Ҷумҳуриҳои Шӯравии Сосиалистӣ (Ittihodi Jumhurihoi Shūravii Sosialistī)	Иттиҳоди Шӯравӣ (Ittihodi Shūravī)
Armenian	ԽՍՀՄ (KhSHM)	Խորհրդային Սոցիալիստական Հանրապետությունների Միություն (Khorhrdayin Soc’ialistakan Hanrapetut’yunneri Miut’yun)	Խորհրդային Միություն (Khorhrdayin Miutʿyun)
Turkmen	ССРС (SSRS)	Совет Социалистик Республикалары Союзы (Sowet Sosialistik Respublikalary Soýuzy)	Совет Союзы (Sowet Soýuzy)
Estonian	NSVL	Nõukogude Sotsialistlike Vabariikide Liit	Nõukogude Liit

== Official minority languages ==
Language	Abbreviation	Full name	Short name
Adyghe	ССРС	Советскэ Социалистическэ Республикхэм я Союз (Sovetskė Sotsialisticheskė Respublikkhėm ya Soyuz)	Советскэ Союз
Arabic; Dagestan ASSR	—N/a	اتحاد الجمهوريات الاشتراكية السوفيتية (Ittiḥādu l-Jumhūriyyati l-Ištirākiyyati l-Sūfyitiyyati)	الاتحاد السوفيتي
Avar	ССРС	Советиял Социалистиял Республикабазул Союз (Sovetazul Sotsialistiyal Respublikazul Soyuz)	Советиял Союз
Bashkir	ССРС	Совет Социалистик Республикалар Союзы (Sovet Sotsialistik Respublikalar Soyuzı)	Советтар Союзы
Buryat	ЗСБНХУ	Зүблэлтэ Социалис Бүгэдэ Найрамдаха Холбоото Улас (Züblelte Socialis Bügede Nairamdaxa Xolbooto Ulas)	Советскэ Союз
Chechen	ССРС	Советски Социалистически Республикийн Союз (Sovetski Socialistiçeski Respublikiyn Soyuz)	Советски Союз
Chuvash	ССРС	Социаллӑ Совет Республикисен Союзӗ (Sociallă Sovet Respublikisen Sojuzĕ)	Совет Союзӗ
Crimean Tatar	ССРС	Совет Социалистик Республикалар Бирлиги (Sovet Sotsialistik Respublikalar Birligi) (Note: Modern name: Совет Социалистик Джумхурийетлер Иттифакъы (Sovet Sotsialistik Cumhuriyetler İttifaqı))	Советлер Бирлиги Sovetler Birligi
Dungan (Chinese script)	СШГЛ	Совет Шәхуэйҗўйи Гунхәгуә Лянмән (蘇維埃社會主義共和國聯盟; Sūwéi'āi Shèhuìzhǔyì Gònghéguó Liánméng)	Совет Лянбон (蘇維埃聯邦)
Erzya	ССРС	Советской Социалистической Республикатнень Союз (Sovetskoy Sotsialisticheskoy Respublikatnenʹ Soyuz)	Советской Союз
Even	ССРС	Советсканя Социалистическаня Республиканя Союзатан (Sovetskanja Socialističeskanja Respublikanja Sojuzatan)	
Finnish; Karelian ASSR	SNTL	Sosialististen Neuvostotasavaltojen Liitto	Neuvostoliitto
German; Volga German ASSR	UdSSR	Union der Sozialistischen Sowjetrepubliken	Sowjetunion
Greek; Pontic Greeks and Mariupol Greeks	ΕΣΣΔ	Ένωση Σοβιετικών Σοσιαλιστικών Δημοκρατιών (Énosi Sovietikón Sosialistikón Dimokratión)	Σοβιετική Ένωση
Ingush	ССРС	Советски Социалистически Республикай Союз (Sovetski Socialističeski Respublikaj Sojuz)	
Kabardian	ССРС	Советскэ Социалистическэ Республикэхэм я Союз (Sovetskè Socialističeskè Respublikèxèm ja Sojuz)	
Karelian (Proper)	SNTL	Sosialistisien neuvoštotašavaltojen liitto	Neuvoštoliitto
Khakas	ССРС	Советскай Социалистическай Республикалар Союзы (Sovetskay Sotsialistiçeskay Respublikalar Soyuzį)	
Komi	ССРС	Сӧветскӧй Социалистическӧй Республикаяслӧн Союз (Sövetsköy Socialističesköy Respublikayaslön Soyuz)	
Kumyk	ССРС	Совет Социалист Республикаланы Союзу (Sovet Sotsialist Respublikalanı Soyuzu)	
Mari	ССРУ	Совет Социализм Республик-влак Ушем (Sovet Sotsializm Respublik-vlak Ušem)	Совет Ушем
Mongolian	ЗХУ	Зөвлөлт Социалист Бүгд Найрамдах Холбоот Улс (Zövlölt Socialist Bügd Najramdax Xolboot Uls)	Зөвлөлт Холбоот Улс
Moksha	ССРС	Советскяй Социалистическяй Республикатнень Союзсна (Sovetskjaj Socialističeskjaj Respublikatnenʹ Sojuzsna)	
Ossetian	ССРЦ	Советон Социалистон Республикæты Цæдис (Soveton Socialiston Respublikæty Cædis)	Советон Цæдис
Polish	ZSRR	Związek Socjalistycznych Republik Radzieckich	Związek Radziecki
Romanian (Latin alphabet)	URSS	Uniunea Republicilor Sovietice Socialiste	Uniunea Sovietică
Tatar	ССРС	Совет Социалистик Республикалар Союзы (Sovet Sotsialistik Respublikalar Soyuzı)	Советлар Союзы
Tuvan	ССРЭ	Совет Социалистиг Республикаларның Эвилели (Sovet Sotsialistig Respublikalaryng Evileli)	
Udmurt	ССРС	Советской Социалистической Республикаослэн Союззы (Sovetskoj Socialističeskaj Respublikaoslė Sojuzy)	
Yakut	ССРС	Советскай Социалистическай Республикалар Союзтара (Sovetskay Sotsialisticheskay Respublikalar Soyuztara)	Советскай Союз
Yiddish	פֿסס"ר	פֿאַרבאַנד פֿונ סאָוועטישע סאָציאַליסטישע רעפּובליקנ (before 1961) פֿאַרבאַנד פֿון סאָוועטישע סאָציאַליסטישע רעפּובליקן (Farband fun Sovetishe Sotsialistishe Republikn)	סאָוועטן־פֿארבאנד
