= Unione Sindacale di Base =

Italian trade union

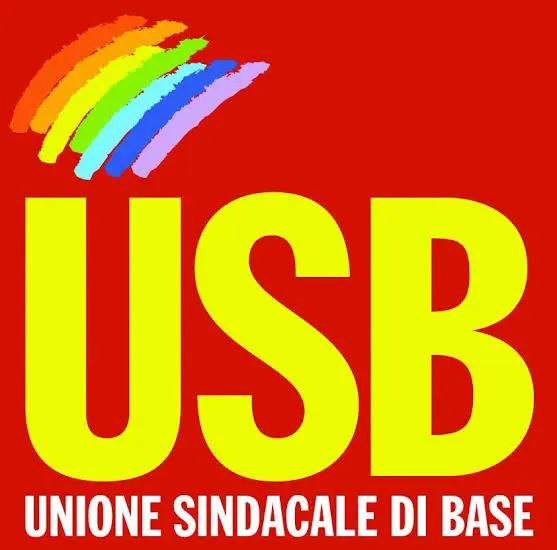
- Website: usb.it

The Unione Sindacale di Base (USB) is an Italian trade union founded in Rome on May 23, 2010. Its ideology revolves around communism and euroscepticism.

== History ==
The USB was born from the merger of Sindacato dei Lavoratori Intercategoriale and Confederazione Unitaria di Base. With approximately 250,000 members from the founding organizations, it aims to spread across all sectors of the workforce and throughout the country with the goal of building a mass alternative to the confederal unions.

In February 2015, Pierpaolo Leonardi, of the USB National Executive, was appointed Secretary of the World Union of Public Employees, a member of the World Federation of Trade Unions.

== Organization ==
The USB has a confederal structure spread across the country, with presence in most regions and provinces. Its internal organization is based on two inter-industry macro-areas: the public and private sectors. At the international level, it is affiliated with the World Federation of Trade Unions.

The union also offers tax and welfare services, dispute resolution and legal services, and has various immigration offices.

== National Congresses ==
- Founding Congress - Rome, May 21-23, 2010 - Connect your struggles!
- Ist National Congress - Montesilvano, June 7-9, 2013 - Turning the Table Over - For a Class-Based, Conflictual, Independent Union
- IInd National Congress - Tivoli, June 9-11, 2017 - Restoring Identity to the Labor Movement. Opposing Exploitation, Control, and Subordination
- IIIrd National Congress - Montesilvano, November 18-20, 2022 - The Strength of the Union

== Trade Federations ==
- USB Pubblico Impiego (PI): the union for workers working in public institutions.
- USB Lavoro Privato (LP): the union for workers working in private companies.
- USB Federazione del Sociale (FdS): the union for the right to housing, pensioners, self-employed, independent workers, casual workers, benefit workers, the unemployed, and students.

== Related Associations ==
AS.I.A. (Associazione Inquilini e Abitanti/ Tenants and Residents Association): association for the right to housing.
