= Elena Luzzatto =

Italian architect (1900–1983)

Elena Luzzatto (30 October 1900 – 1983) was an Italian architect, the first woman to graduate from an architecture program in Italy. She was also known as Elena Luzzatto Valentini.

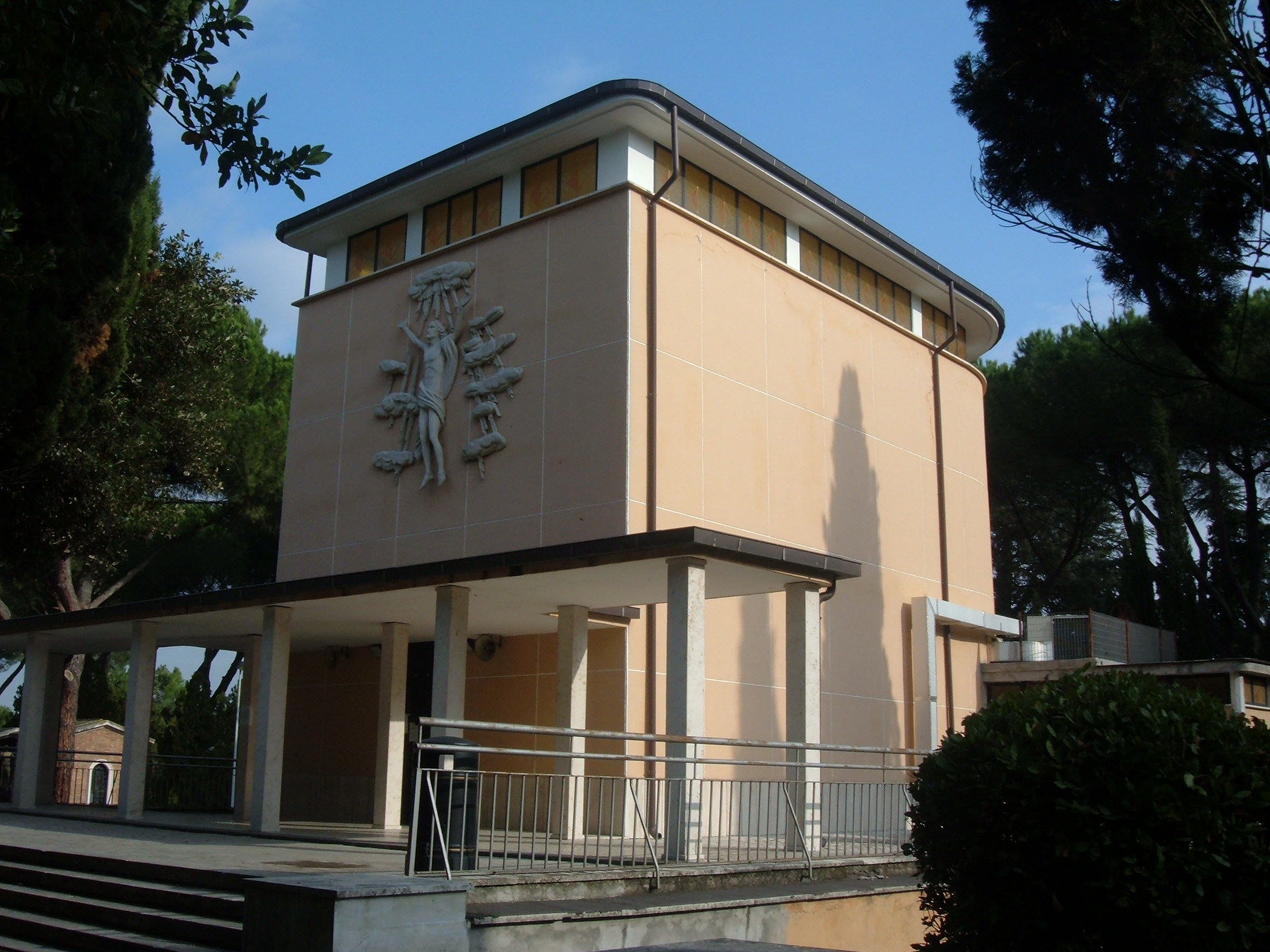
San Michele Arcangelo al al Cimitero Flaminio church by Luzzatto, via Flaminia, Rome

The daughter of Vittorio Valentini and Annarella "Cloe" Luzzatto Gabrielli, she was born in Ancona. Her mother was an architect who received her degree in 1927, two years after her daughter. Luzzatto graduated in architecture from the Regia Scuola Superiore di Architettura in Rome in 1925. From 1928 to 1934, she was an assistant to professor Vincenzo Fasolo at the Faculty of Engineering in Rome. She began her career at the Technical Office for the Municipality of Rome, designing public buildings and restoring monuments. During the Italian fascist period, she designed villas by herself or in partnership with other architects or with her husband, engineer Felice Romoli.

In 1935, Luzzatto designed the covered market in piazza Principe di Napoli (now, Piazza Alessandria) in Rome. In 1945, she won the competition to design Prima Porta Cemetery in Rome. In 1950, she designed the Primavalle I Market in Rome. From 1958 to 1964, she was lead architect for several public housing projects in southern Italy.

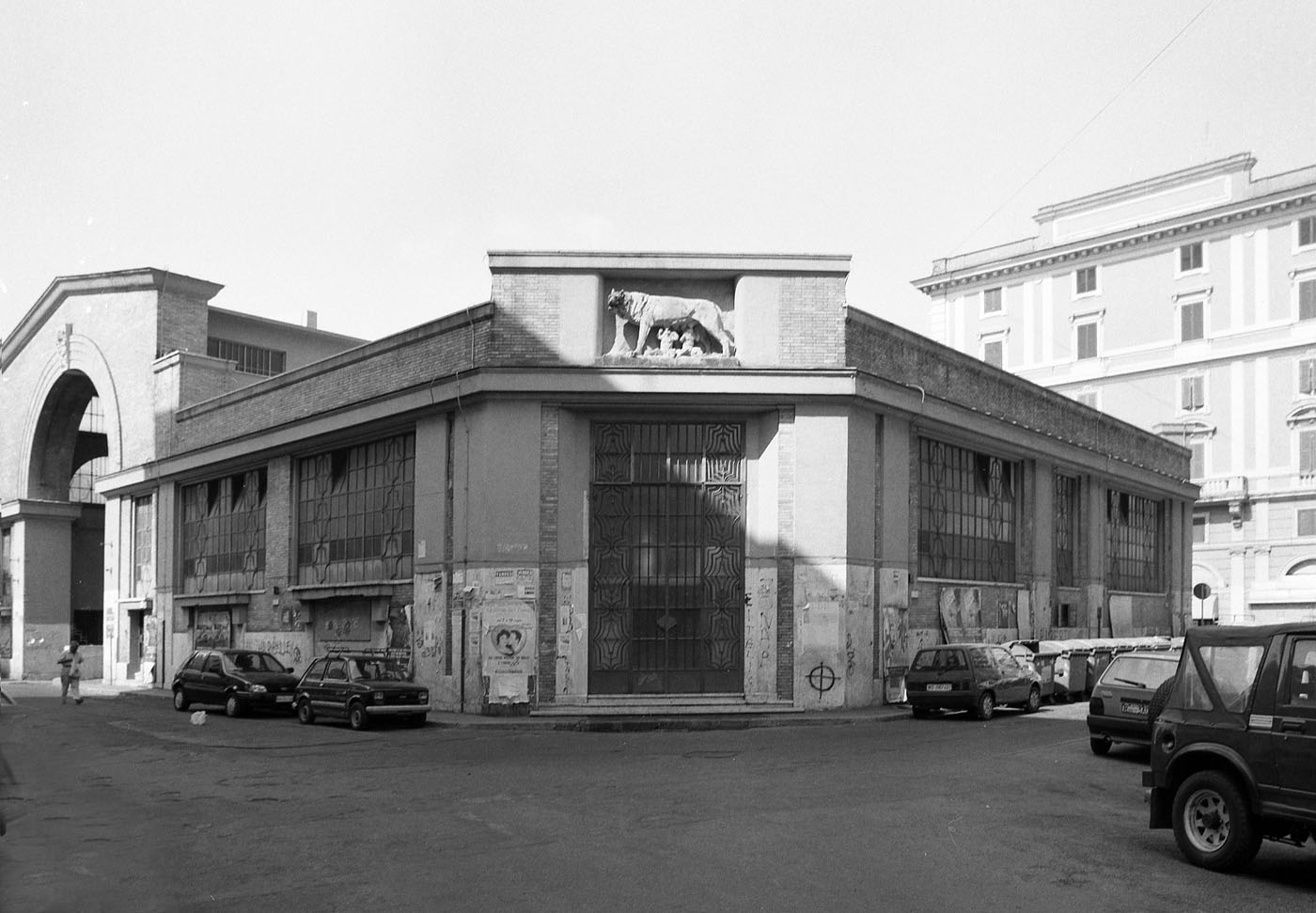
Covered market by Luzzatto, Piazza Alessandria, Rome (1935)

She died in Rome in 1983.
