= 17 October French riots =

2026 riots in France

- Part of 2026 European unrest and 2026 French civil unrest
- Rioters looting a video game store in Paris
- Date: 17 October 2026
- Location: France, Belgium, Italy
- Caused by: Increased cost of living and fuel prices, education, decline of public services
- Methods: Riots, looting, arson, vandalism, black bloc, demonstrations

Casualties
- Deaths: France: 1 protester
- Injuries: France: 1,000+ police officers, gendarmes and firefighters 400+ civilians Belgium: 5 police officers Italy: About 240 total injuries
- Arrested: France: 2,400+ Belgium: 195; Italy: 60
- Detained: Italy: 271

On 17 October 2026, nationwide unrest in France regarding rising living costs, fuel prices, public services, education, and other issues escalated as student organisations joined protests against the cost of living, spearheaded by the Yellow Vests movement. Interior Minister Laurent Nuñez said 110 marches drew 550,000 participants, including 110,000 in Paris; organisers estimated 800,000.

While many of the initial protests and demonstrations throughout September and October were conducted peacefully, violence escalated over the weekend of 17 October, with looting, arson, and attacks occurring across France, and related clashes and property damage in Italy and Belgium.

== France ==
Student and fuel protesters atop the Monument à la République, dressed in a yellow vest reading «1961, la police noie les Algérien‑nes / 2026, la police mutile les lycéen‑nes» ("1961, the police drown Algerians / 2026, the police mutilate high school students"), 17 October 2026

Storefront of a Nébuleuse Bijoux location in Paris, after being looted

The 17 October riots originated in mid-September during the 2026 French civil unrest when the Yellow Vests movement saw a resurgence on social media where calls for a general mobilisation against the cost-of-living crisis, scheduled for 17 October, were shared. On 18 September, school staff and students in schools in Paris began protesting against poor conditions. This soon spread nationwide. Originally motivated by cost-of-living concerns, the new Yellow vests movement expanded in reaction to the police brutality the student protesters had faced in preceding weeks.

On 17 October, the convergence of struggles brought together students, parents, Yellow Vests, the far left, casseurs (hooligans), as well as climate activists. According to the Ministry of the Interior, around 550,000 people took part in marches nationwide, including 110,000 in Paris. The CGT put the figure at 800,000. Violence spread as night fell, with groups of people looting shops and starting fires in Paris, and police responding with tear gas and baton charges.

Rioting took place in several locations. In Lyon, where about 20,000 people marched, some hooded individuals were seen vandalising a branch of the tourist office, tearing letters from its sign and damaging the premises. The tourist office was set on fire. In Marseille, shops and a municipal police station were damaged, and protesters briefly entered the lobby of the city hall. In Limoges, the historic Hôtel de Ville was set ablaze during the evening, which led to the collapse of its roof and bell tower. A demonstrator lost a hand in Saint-Étienne; Nuñez said an investigation had been opened and did not confirm reports that the injury was caused by a police grenade. The Associated Press reported that cars were set on fire and shops looted during clashes between police and groups of protesters.

The iFRAP foundation, a French independent think tank and advocacy group, estimated damage at €1.1 billion, equal to the damage over eleven days of civil unrest following the killing of Nahel Merzouk in 2023. Around 1,500 shops were severely damaged, and a further 3,000 were looted. More than 1,500 fires involving vehicles and public equipment were reported. Public buildings and businesses were also attacked in Paris, Marseille, Lyon, Lille and Bordeaux. Around 60 buildings suffered fire damage. The Associated Press reported about 400 arrests throughout the day. Prime Minister Sébastien Lecornu later said 1,200 people had been arrested and 150 police officers and gendarmes injured.

=== Government reaction ===
On 19 October, interior minister Laurent Nuñez submitted his resignation, which President Emmanuel Macron rejected. In the following week, the government banned protests in downtown areas and instituted curfews in major cities across the country. It likewise called upon the police to limit the number of agents on leave during the school vacations in an effort to deploy a 20% larger force across the country. On 13 November, Laurent Nuñez responded to the threat from police unions of a strike unless the risk bonus was increased to 35% (of officers' salary), but the response did not satisfy union representatives.

The government announced within two days that it would pay the salaries of employees whose place of work had been pillaged and would establish a support fund for those businesses affected. A riot tax is slated to be added to insurance policies in France starting 1 January 2027. This is a consequence of a series of episodes of civil unrest and was already in the works prior to the 17 October riots.

While the government initially blamed the "ultra-left" for the violence of October 17, "most of the people convicted turned out to be opportunistic looters with no political leaning". Hundreds of people without criminal records or links to terrorism had their movements restricted by MICAS (mesure individuelle de contrôle administratif et de surveillance, individual measure of administrative control and supervision), an emergency power created in the aftermath of the November 2015 Paris attacks. These measures, which do not require judicial authorization, have been criticized as a way of conflating protest with terrorism.

In Paris, for the 5th of November, the prefecture did not approve the union's proposed itinerary from Place de la Bastille to Place de la Concorde, suggesting an alternate route from Place de la République to Place de la Nation, which had been forbidden two weeks earlier. Major hubs allowing access to Paris from the suburbs were shut down in the afternoon. On 31 October, the Rhone prefecture asked TCL to suspend subway services in Lyon, denying that the request was related to demonstrations, but instead stating that it was intended to "protect several sectors of the city" from radical groups seeking to cause damage to businesses and public buildings. The city center of Lyon was still off limits to protesters four weeks after the 17 October riots.

A G7 summit of interior ministers scheduled to take place at the Rhone prefecture from 20-21 November in Lyon was postponed and relocated to Paris due to the social climate. Plans for disruption being made by groups on Telegram led the ministry to make this decision.

On 16 November, in his testimony to the lower house's 17 October commission, Paris mayor Emmanuel Grégoire expressed concern about the common impression that there were disparities in law enforcement on 17 October, with police intervening more frequently in western Paris, leaving eastern Paris more open to systematic looting.

== Italy ==
In major Italian cities (Milan, Turin, Bologna, Verona, Rome, Bari, Florence, Venice, Padua, Treviso and Cagliari), students from the Italia in Piazza movement, alongside trade unions and political organizations, staged protests in response to the rising cost of living and the sharp surge in the price of gasoline and other fuels—developments attributed to the war in Iran. Meanwhile, in Southern Italy, truck drivers, farmers, and fishermen held local protests and subsequently organized blockades at ports and along major roadways, leading to the temporary emptying of supermarket shelves and a failure to resupply gasoline stations with fuel. The Italian government has also planned to set a percentage limit on the number of foreign students in Italian classrooms relative to Italian students—by distributing them across multiple classes—and to eliminate classes consisting exclusively of foreign students, with the aim of fostering better integration and mutual understanding.

In Milan, the police used water cannons after protesters threw stones at them in the Gothic Cathedral. In Bologna, police used a water cannon to try to disperse the crowd, and arrested seven people. Most of the material damage occurred in Milan. In Rome, protesters threw firecrackers and cherry bombs and set off fire extinguishers to throw them at the Ministry of Education building. The protesters called for the Minister of Education to "get out of the building" while shouting the slogan "More classrooms, no more bombs." The Italian Education Minister said "This is not a democratic expression of dissent, nor a defence of the school, but an attack on institutions, and political hooliganism."

On 19 October, the 17 October Movement spontaneously took shape. In the early hours of 20 October 2026, viral messages and screenshots of fake news began circulating, claiming that rioters would burn down universities.

=== Government reaction ===
The Italian government intended to deploy 500 army troops to defend Milan on 19 October and implement new security measures for 20 October, such as extending preventive detention for minors and cracking down on youth gangs. Additionally, shops in central Milan announced their early closures in response to the looting, and some have removed merchandise from their windows.

== Belgium ==
In Belgium, the 17 October protests were against the education reforms and rising education costs that the protestors feared would make higher education less accessible. They were primarily focused in Brussels and Liege. 195 people were arrested on Saturday. Inspired by and a direct spillover of the protests in France, it was also a wider anti-austerity movement as the Prime Minister of Belgium, Bart De Wever proposed €10 billion in budget cuts and raising the retirement age to 67. As the protests progressed they grew violent, and Interior Minister of Belgium, Bernard Quintin, said the situation was "no longer simply a protest". "It is pure and simple violence, organized and repeated with the aim of destabilising our society", he wrote in a post on social media, adding that "all necessary measures will be taken to restore order in the face of the rioters". According to the Belgian police, the protesters started to use electric scooters and construction equipment to block roads and "cause significant damage" in Brussels. Additionally, they reported vandalism and arson by protestors. The Belgian police repeatedly used tear gas and water cannons to break up the protesters.

== Reactions ==
French authorities blamed far-left groups and opportunistic looters for the violence, while ecologist Marine Tondelier blamed the government for misjudging the social climate, and many politicians across the political spectrum questioned the police's strategy for maintaining order.

=== Germany ===
Germany's Federal Minister of the Interior, Alexander Dobrindt, condemned the riots in France and said on 19 October, "Those who turn streets into battlefields, attack police officers, and set fire to town halls are not demonstrating for better education, but are rather waging an armed battle against the free society and our way of life", adding that "anyone who fails to recognize that left-wing extremists and a migrant class are coming together here on the street to wage a joint battle against the democratic system, has not understood the situation."

=== Donald Trump ===
U.S. President Donald Trump claimed that the unrest was due to immigration.
