= 2026 European unrest =

- Part of the Gen Z protests
- Top to bottom, left to right: Protesters atop the Monument à la République in Paris; Protesters in Tirana as part of the Flamingo Revolution; Housing protest in Rossio, Lisbon; Housing protest in Madrid; Protesters in Olomouc; Anti-conscription protest in Leipzig
- Date: 15 July 2026 – present (4 months and 7 days)
- Location: Europe
- Caused by: See background
- Methods: Demonstrations, general strikes, student activism, motorcades, protest camps, internet activism, hacktivism, direct action, peace walks, cacerolazos, occupations, civil disobedience, boycotts, sit-ins, traffic obstruction, roadblocks, barricades, civil resistance, civil disorder, black bloc, vandalism, arson, looting, riots and attacks against law enforcement
- Status: Ongoing

Casualties
- Deaths: 1 (France)

Since July 2026, mass protest movements arose across Europe. Major demonstrations were held across Albania, Belgium, Czechia, France, Germany, Georgia, Greece, Ireland, Italy, Poland, Portugal, Serbia, Spain and Ukraine, with minor demonstrations and strikes occurring in other countries. A motivation commonly ascribed to the protests is the ongoing cost-of-living crisis. The protests have been largely led by young people, particularly Generation Z.

== Background ==
Countries with protests in October 2026

The protests unfolded in the face of rising unaffordability, poor working and educational conditions and dissatisfaction with the ruling governments. Several countries faced mounting pressure to rein in their deficits as higher borrowing costs made their debts more difficult to service. France and Belgium had budget deficits amounting to ~5% of the national GDP, resulting in a debt crisis which led to the enacting of austerity measures, severely affecting education and public services.

The fuel and energy crises caused by the Russo-Ukrainian and Iran wars (especially the Strait of Hormuz and Bab al-Mandab Strait crises), coupled with high inflation, unemployment and economic stagnation soon worsened the situation, leading to widespread protests across the continent. Other issues also included the declining standard of living, opposition to military rearmament and interventionism, accusations of political corruption and censorship, Illiberalism, property speculation and landlord harassment, housing crisis, environmental and climate concerns, social inequality, racism, solidarity with Palestine and police brutality.

== Analysis ==
Writing for Axios, Rebecca Falconer described the protests as not a single movement, but originating from a series of shared concerns relating to cost-of-living, educational standards and general economic and political dissatisfaction. The Economist noted that the protests and riots were primarily about "the cost of living and poor public services" and that right-wing narratives attributing the unrest to Muslims, left-wing extremism, immigration or race were inaccurate. It also noted that most protesters were citizens of their respective countries.

The European Students' Union (ESU) released its sixth student protest monitoring report on 12 November. According to the report, 29 protest actions were recorded across 12 European countries between 16 July and 16 September 2026. Serbia saw the highest number of protests, with 11, followed by the Netherlands with four and Italy and Greece with three each. The protests addressed issues such as student housing, university funding, access to higher education and solidarity with Palestine. Smaller protest actions were also recorded in Romania, Turkey and the United Kingdom during the same period, as well as in Bosnia during August.

== Demonstrations ==
=== Albania ===
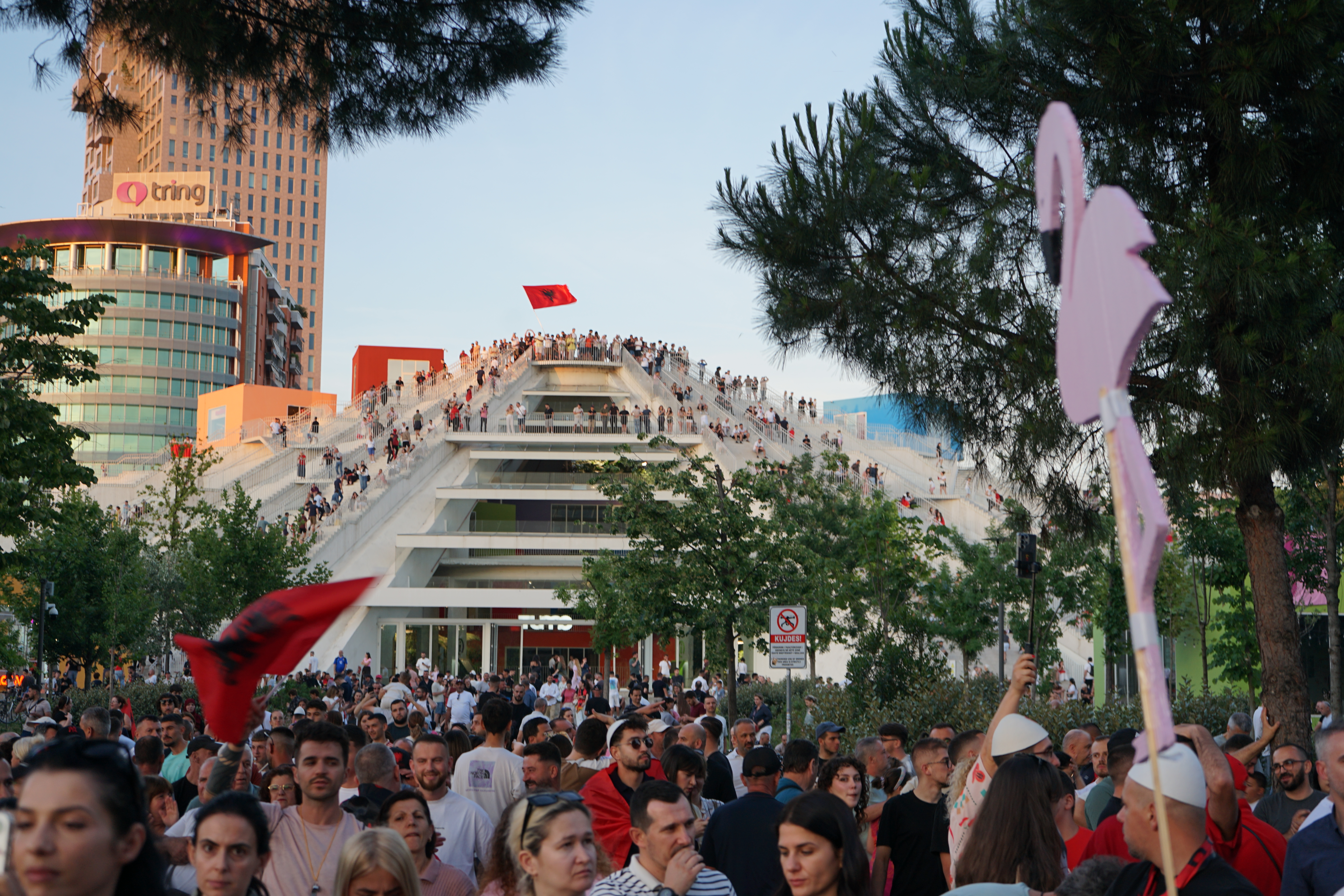
Protesters in Tirana, Albania

Protests erupted in Albania in late May 2026 in response to the planned development of a new resort on the ecologically protected Sazan Island. The development, which was to be undertaken by Jared Kushner, prompted major backlash, ushering in what became known as the Flamingo Revolution. Initially confined to concerns over the Sazan resort, the demonstrations grew to call for the resignation of incumbent prime minister Edi Rama who had been running the country since 2013. Throughout his thirteen years in power, Rama faced criticism for alleged corruption, misuse of public funds, and favoritism.

A new wave of demonstrations began on 13 October, when students began protesting over higher educational costs, a lack of financial aid, conditions at universities, and future job prospects. Protesters clashed with the riot police who employed tear gas and other riot weaponry.

Thousands of people gathered in Tirana on 24 October for another anti-government demonstration. Police used tear gas against protesters, and government buildings were attacked. Authorities reported that more than 300 protesters and police officers had been injured.

=== Austria ===
On 22 October 2026, thousands of people demonstrated in Vienna at the call of the Austrian National Union of Students (ÖH), demanding increased funding for universities and opposing planned cuts to higher education and research. Organizers estimated the turnout at 20,000 while other estimates reached 30,000. The protests follow demonstrations organized by the ÖH and Universities Austria (uniko) in spring 2026, which attracted approximately 40,000 participants.

=== Belgium ===
Fire near the Brussels-Central railway station during student protests on 9 October

Demonstrators convened in Brussels and Liège on 17 October in response to the deteriorating conditions of schools and the increasing costs of education. In response, Belgian police launched tear gas and used water cannons, accusing the protesters of igniting fires and launching fireworks. Interior Minister of Belgium, Bernard Quintin, claimed on 17 October "what is unfolding in Brussels is no longer mere protest and all necessary means will be used to restore order in the face of the rioters."

In Liège, there was also a protest in response to the increasing costs of education and the difficulty in obtaining study materials.

=== Czechia ===
Letná against 4:36 (Letná proti 4:36), reportedly the largest demonstration in Czechia

During the night of 23–24 October 2026, protesters gathered near the Chamber of Deputies of the Parliament of the Czech Republic and at Malostranské Square in Prague to protest against abolishing the television licence system used to fund the public service media Czech Television and Czech Radio. Some of the protesters tried to storm the Chamber of Deputies while lawmakers were debating the bill overnight, but the police stopped them. Vít Rakušan, an opposition politician described this demonstration as the longest in Czech history, while Martin Kupka described it as "likely the longest demonstration in the modern history of the Czech Republic". PM Andrej Babiš compared the demonstration near the Chamber of Deputies to the January 6 United States Capitol attack. The protest lasted about 16 hours.

In the days that followed, protests took place in other cities, such as Olomouc, Liberec, Brno, České Budějovice and others. Happenings and protests also took place in smaller towns such as Humpolec, Rožnov pod Radhoštěm, and Jindřichův Hradec. On 25 October, thousands (according to some media outlets, tens of thousands) of people gathered on Old Town Square. Some of the protests are usually called "student protest".

On 3 November, staff at both public service broadcasters called a strike in response to political developments. Students from some schools also joined the strike. Prime minister Andrej Babiš stated that he acknowledged the strike and demonstrations, but the coalition plans were not changed.

The organization Milion chvilek pro demokracii (A Million Moments for Democracy) also called for a demonstration on Sunday, 15 November at Letná Plain called Letná against 4:36. Reportedly, it was the largest demonstration in the history of the independent Czech Republic with an estimated turnout of around 400,000 people.

=== Denmark ===
In Denmark, 11 student associations planned a demonstration in Copenhagen for 4 November 2026 to protest proposed cuts to state-funded student grants. Organizers expected around 10,000 people to take part, but some media outlets reported up to 30,000 protesters. The demonstration was set to start at City Hall Square and then head to the Danish Parliament.

=== France ===
Student and fuel protesters atop the Monument à la République, dressed in a yellow vest reading «1961, la police noie les Algérien‑nes / 2026, la police mutile les lycéen‑nes» ("1961, the police drown Algerians / 2026, the police mutilate high school students"), 17 October 2026

Since September 2026, demonstrations and protests against poor economic and school conditions by workers and lycée (high school) students have taken place in France. In early October, the protests developed into a nationwide mobilization involving students, teachers, parents, political organizations, the yellow vests and trade unions, with an estimated 575,000–1.57 million people participating nationwide.

Labour movements emerged in mid-September in reaction to the cost-of-living and fuel crisis caused by the blockade of the Strait of Hormuz and Bab al-Mandab Strait, spearheaded by a newly revived yellow vests movement. Causes also included high inflation, housing, economic stagnation, social inequality and unemployment, coupled with austerity measures and social spending cuts resulting from the public debt crisis.

Soon after, teacher shortages, overcrowded classrooms, run-down buildings, and limited public investment in social programs and infrastructure sparked immense students protests nationwide. Students noted stress linked to the university application website Parcoursup and high temperatures in classrooms that reached up to 40 °C (104 °F) during the 2026 European heatwaves. Despite forming separately, the protest movements converged on 17 October, along with other unrelated movements.

==== Police reaction ====
Protesters were met with heavy-handed police reactions, being attacked with tear gas, batons, stun grenades, and rubber bullets. A 16‑year-old‑girl lost vision in her eye after being shot by a rubber bullet. The left hand of a 15‑year‑old boy was blown off by a stun grenade. A 14-year-old student suffered a smashed jaw and the loss of his upper teeth after a police officer shot him at point blank range with a tear gas canister, allegedly leaving him on the ground without calling emergency services. The family of the student filed a complaint for attempted murder. In addition to cases of physical brutality, French police have been accused of using racial insults, disproportionately targeting minority students and committing sexual assault. Over 6,700 minors had been arrested by 23 October.

=== Georgia ===
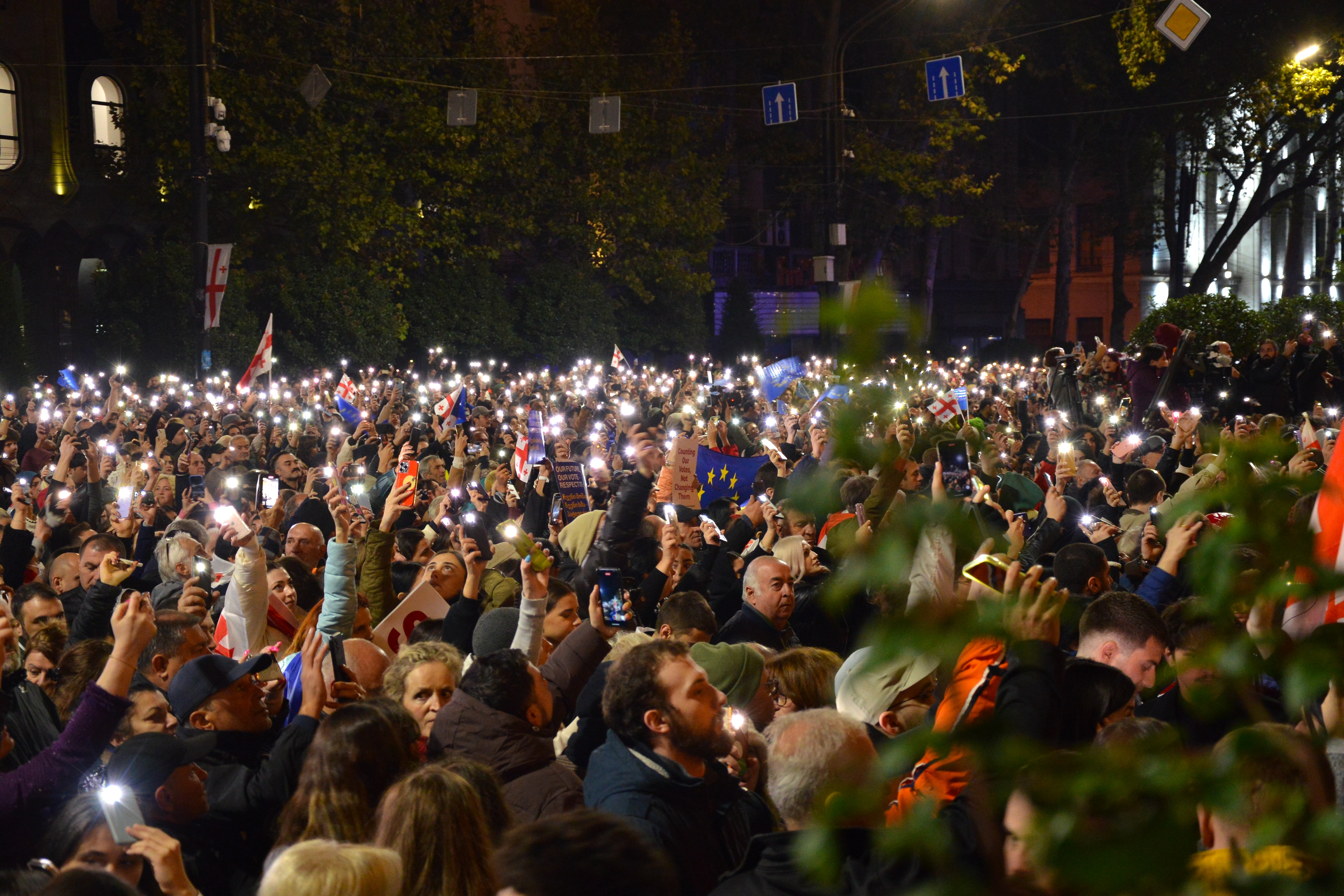
Protesters in Tbilisi, Georgia

The 2024–2026 Georgian protests (Georgian: საქართველოს საპროტესტო აქციები, romanized: sakartvelos sap’rot’est’o aktsiebi) began on 28 October 2024 after the preliminary official results of the parliamentary election of 26 October were announced. The ruling Georgian Dream party, led by Bidzina Ivanishvili, declared victory according to those results. The demonstrators claimed that the elections were fraudulent, and demanded a recount and a new election.

A string of protests and legal challenges against the election outcome took place in the following months and escalated on 28 November when the ruling party announced that, it would "suspend" the European Union accession process until the end of 2028. This decision occurred against the background of Georgians' high levels of trust in the EU.

Police and ruling party-affiliated violent groups engaged in widespread violence and torture against protesters and journalists. Evidence circulated on social media indicating violence by the Titushky. The Public Defender of Georgia found that the type and severity of injuries intentionally inflicted on protesters "constitutes an act of torture". An investigation by BBC also revealed that the ruling party had used a chemical weapon camite against protestors, which the UN Special Rapporteur on Torture described as "absolutely in violation of human rights law."

On 13 February 2025, the European Parliament passed a resolution stating that it does not recognize the results of both the parliamentary and presidential elections as legitimate. High-ranking officials of the Georgian Dream ruling party were sanctioned by the United States, United Kingdom, and a number of individual EU member states. On 4 October 2025, some parts of the opposition attempted to storm the Presidential Palace, but were stopped by the security forces.

=== Germany ===
Student protest banner against conscription in Germany

On 5 December 2025, the Bundestag voted for a law aiming to modernize the Bundeswehr, which, from 2026 on, included the model of a "new conscription", which obliged all men aged 18 to answer a digital questionnaire. This led to fears of a re-establishment of compulsory conscription in Germany, sparking school strikes across hundreds of German cities. According to the organizers up to 40,000 students joined the demonstrations. The school strikes are supported by student councils and unions, trade unions, peace organizations, churches and various groups of the political left against conscription and militarization through demonstrations and school strikes.

Chancellor Friedrich Merz of the centre-right CDU, who took office in May 2025, saw his and his party's popularity steeply declining since April 2026. Elections in September in the states of Saxony-Anhalt, Mecklenburg-Vorpommern and Berlin as well as public opinion polling for the 2029 federal election saw the far-right Alternative for Germany (AfD) gain unprecedented traction, while left-wing The Left won the Berlin election in the same month. Merz's ambition to enforce a disputed reform package by the end of 2026 led to a rift with ruling "Grand Coalition" partner SPD and resulted in additional nationwide protests, albeit of mostly peaceful nature.

On 31 October, during the third weekend of protests in France, demonstrations were also held in Germany. German police said they had arrested more than 200 people after violent clashes in several cities on Saturday night, with some cases of looting and attacks on police officers. The police offering included Bereitschaftspolizei (riot police), arrest units and water cannons. In Frankfurt, the paramilitary Spezialeinsatzkommando was also deployed to disperse the protests. The clashes came after largely peaceful "Gen Z" demonstrations in more than 30 German cities, where tens of thousands of young people had gathered to call for higher education funding and relief from rising living costs, and to oppose plans to reintroduce compulsory military service. Germany's Minister of the Interior, Alexander Dobrindt, condemned the riots, saying "violent left-wing groups and troublemakers from the migrant milieu" had hijacked the peaceful demonstrations that had taken place during the afternoon. He praised the police's operational concept of "massive presence and decentralized deployment" as having prevented further excess of violence.

Protests in Germany were coordinated by the organization "Gen Z regelt" (Gen Z handles), which is headed by an individual named Akram Selo. After the 31 October protests, the organization posted "This was just the beginning", calling for recurring demonstrations with 20 November set as the next date.

On 14 November, a demonstration organized by Gen Z regelt took place in Berlin's Charlottenburg district, attracting around 1,200 participants, according to police figures. Police reported 20 provisional arrests and 28 criminal complaints. Three police officers were injured, while the police provided no information on injuries among demonstrators. Before the march began, some participants reportedly attempted to break through a police cordon. During subsequent confrontations and arrests, officers used physical force, including pushing, punches and kicks. The Tagesspiegel described the demonstration as largely peaceful overall and reported that no shops along Kurfürstendamm were damaged.

On 20 November 2026, students in Germany joined a cross-border "international youth strike". Organisers said it spanned at least 25 countries, including Germany.. The group "Gen Z regelt" reported demonstrations in 73 German cities and towns. Police put attendance in Berlin's Alexanderplatz at about 4,000, while the rally in Cologne fell short of the anticipated 5,000 but still drew a crowd in the thousands. The gatherings remained largely peaceful, with turnout generally in the hundreds to low thousands.

=== Greece ===
On 13 October, Greek students began protests in the Syntagma Square of Athens, which were centered around the issues of unaffordable prices of living for students, mainly in terms of student housing. Additionally, protesters brought up complaints of the lack of funding for the public education system. Demonstrators erected tents outside of the Ministry of National Economy and Finance and the Hellenic Parliament, mainly as a blockade, but, according to the Hellenic Broadcasting Corporation, the tents are also a comment about the condition of housing in Greece. The organizers said that the tents were planned to stand for the following two days, and then a protest concert would be held the following week on 20 October.

Additionally, the Communist Party of Greece supported the protests.

=== Ireland ===
On 1 October, more than 1,500 students marched in Dublin to protest the effects of cost of living and student fees. The event was organized by the Aontas na Mac Léinn in Éirinn, the national students' union for Irish higher education, and was largely peaceful.

On 14 October, 300,000 public sector workers went on a general strike as part of a pay dispute between workers and the government. The strike was supported by large unions such as Fórsa and SIPTU. On the 2 November, another strike was announced for the 12 November due to delays in agreeing a new pay deal. This coincided with a meeting of European Leaders but was called off after last minute negotiations.

On 13 November, around 100 demonstrators marched to the city hall in Dublin, as part of the campaign against cost of living and fuel price crisis. The route began in the General Post Office to the city hall. Garda forces were deployed along the route to contain the protesters.

=== Italy ===
Broken shopfront in Milan, Italy after rioting on 17 October

On 16 October, Italian students in major cities like Milan, Turin, Bologna, Genoa, Verona, Rome, Bari, Florence, Venice, Padua, Treviso and Cagliari started protesting, inspired by their French counterparts. The mobilization was denominated "No Meloni Day". Demonstrators protested against the conditions of Italian educational facilities, against the measures adopted by the government to limit the number of foreign students in classrooms, and demanded that the government spend more on education and less on weapons.

Students from the Italia in Piazza movement, alongside trade unions and political organizations, staged protests in response to the rising cost of living and the sharp surge in the price of gasoline and other fuels—developments attributed to the war in Iran. The Italian government has also planned to set a percentage limit on the number of foreign students in Italian classrooms relative to Italian students and to eliminate classes consisting exclusively of foreign students, with the aim of "fostering better integration and mutual understanding".

In Milan, the police used water cannons after protesters threw stones at them in the Gothic Cathedral. In Bologna, police used a water cannon to disperse the crowd and arrested seven people. Most of the material damage occurred in Milan. In Rome, demonstrators threw firecrackers, fire extinguishers and cherry bombs in front of the Ministry of Education building, calling for Giuseppe Valditara, the Italian Minister of Education, and asking him to "get out of the building" while shouting the slogan "More classrooms, no more bombs." The Italian Education Minister said "This is not a democratic expression of dissent, nor a defence of the school, but an attack on institutions, and political hooliganism". During the second day of the protests in Milan, Turin, and Bologna, small riots split off from the protests, which had developed to encompass general social and economic discontent. Milan saw increased rioting, with many luxury storefronts reportedly looted.

On 19 October, the 17 October Movement spontaneously took shape. In the early hours of 20 October 2026, viral messages and screenshots of fake news began circulating, claiming that rioters would burn down universities. The Italian government intended to deploy 500 army troops to defend Milan on 19 October and implement new security measures for 20 October, such as extending preventive detention for minors and cracking down on "youth gangs". Additionally, shops in central Milan announced their early closure in response to the looting, while some removed merchandise from their front windows.

Meanwhile, in Southern Italy, truck drivers, farmers, and fishermen held local protests and subsequently organized blockades at ports and along major roadways, leading to the temporary emptying of supermarket shelves and a failure to resupply gasoline stations with fuel. The students' protest became part of a broader climate of social protest, with the movement seeing road haulers and other categories joining student protests and going on strike because of the high costs of diesel and the already high cost of living. In Apulia, students, road haulers and farmers demonstrated together. Minister of Infrastructure and Transport Matteo Salvini scheduled a meeting with representatives of road haulers for 20 October in Milan. Representatives of the Calabrian road haulers have said that they will not stop the strikes, blockades and demonstrations if the meeting does not result in a "satisfying outcome".

On 24 October, thousands of people took part in demonstrations in several Italian cities, including Milan, Rome, Turin, Naples, Bologna and Florence. According to Italian police, nine people were arrested and 371 were temporarily detained during protests in eight cities. Of those taken to police stations, 110 were minors.

=== Lithuania ===
An anti-immigration demonstration took place in Vilnius on 3 October. At the same time, a counter-demonstration was also held to express opposing views.

On 24 October, a protest called "Laikas tirpsta" (Time Is Melting) took place in Vilnius at Vinco Kudirkos Square [] in Vilnius nearby Palace of the Government of the Republic of Lithuania. The main reason was the climate crisis.

=== Luxembourg ===
On 27 October, protesters gathered near the Chamber of Deputies in Luxembourg City. The main reason for the demonstration was the housing crisis.

=== Netherlands ===
On 15 September, Dutch farmers called for a general strike following the announcement of the budget for 2027. Protesters blockaded several highways and set fire to tires and hay bales, severely affecting traffic along the middle and eastern regions of the country. Police later found pipes, cables and other materials scattered in or around at least 20 railways across the country, including on the border with Germany, leading to many trains being halted. ProRail spokesperson Joke van der Cruysen said that these objects were placed deliberately by protesters, with authorities suspecting that it may have been an intentional act of sabotage.

On 19 September, riot police broke up a far-right anti-immigration rally in The Hague after violence erupted at Malieveld park. Protesters reportedly made Nazi salutes, chanted antisemitic slogans and clashed with authorities, throwing rocks, fireworks and other projectiles at police. At least 500 people took part in the march, with 24 being detained by police, which used batons, pepper spray and water cannons to disperse the rioters.

On 31 October, shopkeepers in The Hague boarded up stores and shops following online calls for Gen Z protests.

=== Portugal ===
Protest encampments in Rossio, Portugal

In September and October, tens of thousands took to the streets of Lisbon, Porto, Aveiro, Braga, Funchal, Faro (in solidarity with the Porto encampment) and Coimbra with the slogan "We can no longer live like this" (Portuguese: Não dá mais para viver assim) to protest an affordable housing crisis, cost-of-living crisis, wages not keeping up with house prices and a decrease in housing construction. Organizations such as the General Confederation of the Portuguese Workers and several housing rights movements also called for protests. On 15 October, 37 people were injured after police officers intervened to remove tents set up by protesters in Porto. Police also intervened in a camp in Lisbon on 20 October and arrested 55 protesters.

Portugal is noted for having one of the worst housing crises in Europe according to Reuters, which stated that purchase prices and rents for new leases nearly doubled since 2017.

=== Poland ===
Protest outside Poland's constitutional court

On 22 October 2026, demonstrations for legal abortion took place in 28 cities including Warsaw, Kraków, Poznań, Wroclaw, and Czestochowa; in some cities, they were accompanied by counterdemonstrations by nationalist groups.

On 30 October, riot police were deployed outside Poland's Constitutional Tribunal in Warsaw following the suspension of its president, Bogdan Święczkowski, and vice-president, Bartłomiej Sochański, by a group of judges. The decision sparked protests and heightened political tensions between Prime Minister Donald Tusk's government and the opposition Law and Justice (PiS) party. Polish president Karol Nawrocki also cut short his visit to Senegal and returned to Poland amid the crisis.

=== Serbia ===
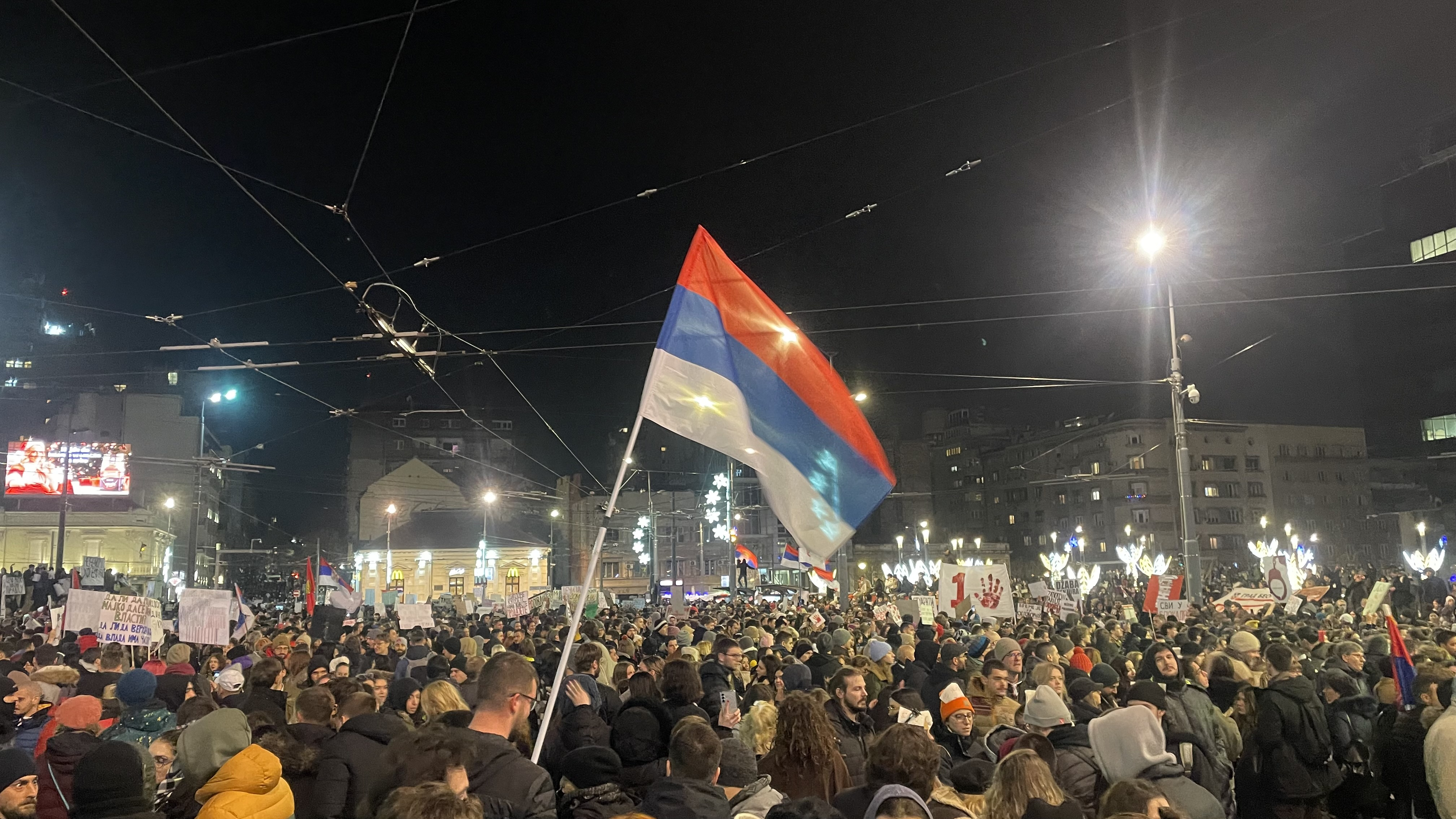
Protest at Slavija Square in Belgrade, Serbia

On 22 October, students and their supporters held a final rally at Slavija Square in Belgrade in support of the Student List, which emerged from the anti-corruption protests, ahead of the parliamentary election on 25 October. Agence France-Presse reported that tens of thousands of people attended, while the Associated Press reported hundreds of thousands. Scores of students had been detained over the previous two years as the government cracked down on the protests, while there were also reports of state surveillance and cyberattacks against activists.

The Student List sought to end more than 14 years of rule by Aleksandar Vučić's Serbian Progressive Party, while 24 Serbian civil society groups warned that the conditions for free and fair elections were lacking. Student List won the election, and Vučić conceded defeat on the election night. According to the final results announced by the Republic Electoral Commission on 5 November, it won 140 of the 250 seats in the National Assembly, an absolute majority.

=== Spain ===
Protest march in Madrid, Spain

A series of protests began in Spain following the high-profile eviction on 23 September 2026 of an 87-year-old, María del Carmen "Maricarmen" Abascal, which brought the country's ongoing affordable housing crisis back into the spotlight. Public discontent on the issue of housing had already been building up over a scandal involving the controversial purchase of a luxury penthouse by Madrid premier Isabel Díaz Ayuso and the suicide of an evicted woman in L'Hospitalet de Llobregat, Olga Matute, earlier in September. On 26 September, the protests turned into an organised protest camp at the Puerta del Sol square in Madrid, in an action widely compared to the 15-M Movement in 2011, forcing the Spanish government under Prime Minister Pedro Sánchez to agree to an emergency relief package including a temporary ban on evictions and stronger protection for tenants amid soaring rents.

Maricarmen died shortly after her eviction, on 7 October. Sánchez's attempt to pass the housing relief package through parliament failed due to opposition from the far-right Vox, right-wing People's Party (PP), and center-right Junts, prompting him to dissolve the Congress of Deputies and call a snap election for 29 November.

=== Switzerland ===
Protests broke out in Zurich and Basel on 31 October, with protesters erecting barriers and setting them on fire in district 4. Later, police and firefighters managed to disperse the riot and brought the situation under control.

=== Ukraine ===
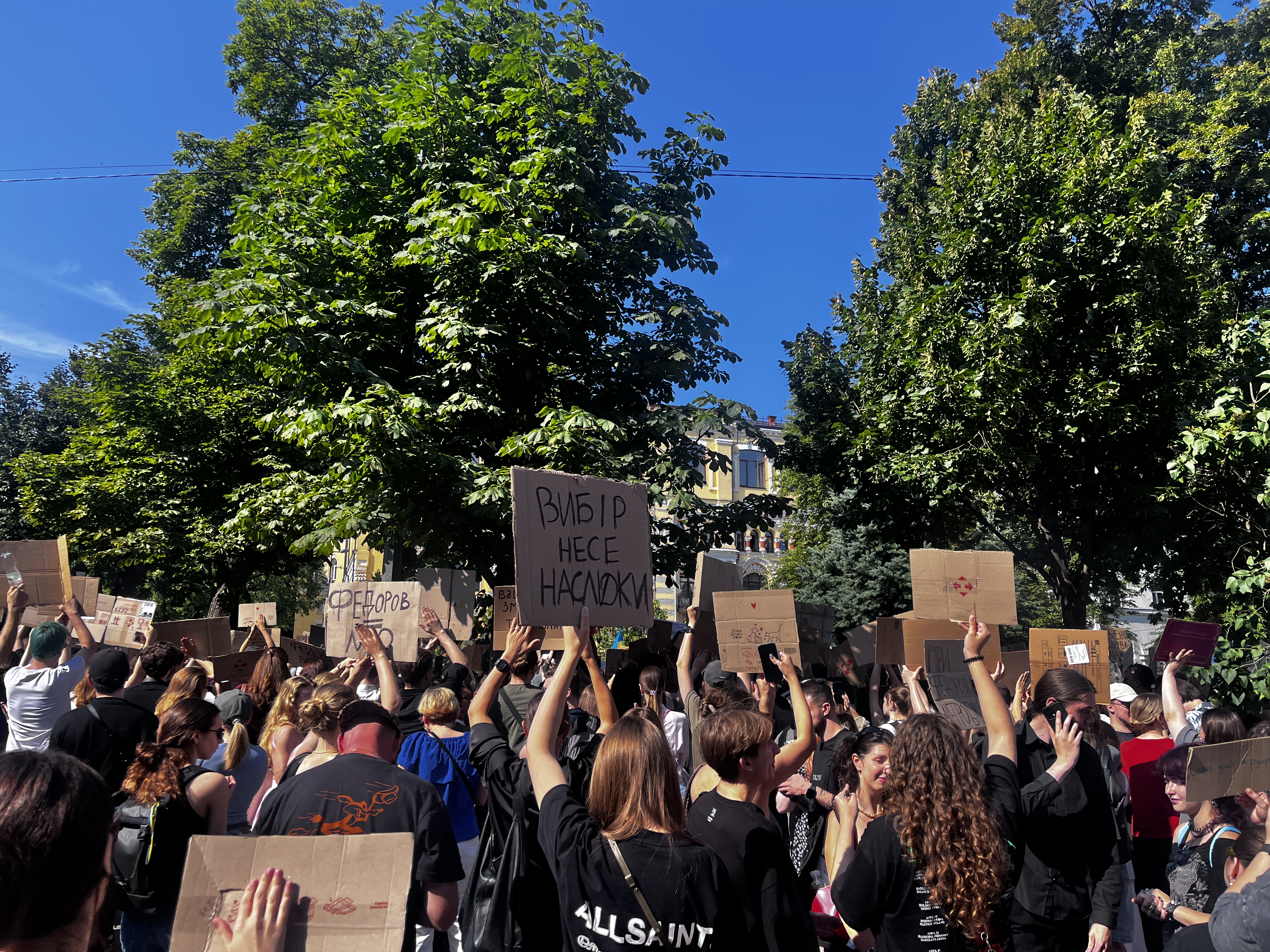
Protest march at Ivan Franko Square in Kyiv, Ukraine

Protests against the dismissal of Mykhailo Fedorov, (Note: Ukrainian: Протести проти відставки Михайла Федорова, romanized: Protesty proty vidstavky Mykhaila Fedorova.) sometimes called the pro-Fedorov protests, began on 15 July 2026 after Mykhailo Fedorov, the Minister of Defence of Ukraine, was dismissed from his position by Ukrainian President Volodymyr Zelenskyy, leading to widespread protests by Ukrainian citizens throughout the country. The dismissal was officially part of a wider cabinet reshuffle being conducted by Zelenskyy for the new Koretskyi Government, but as was widely reported, including by Fedorov and Zelenskyy, infighting between Fedorov and others in political and military leadership played a major role. The dismissal caused significant backlash across Ukraine, resulting in a series of protests and resignations by others in government and military in the immediate aftermath. As a result of the protests, Zelenskyy dismissed Oleksandr Syrskyi as Commander-in-Chief of the Armed Forces of Ukraine on 21 July.

== 17 October riots ==
17 October riots
- Part of 2026 French civil unrest
- Rioters looting a video game store in Paris
- Date: 17 October 2026
- Location: France, Italy and Belgium
- Caused by: Increased cost of living and fuel prices, discontent with the education sector and decline of public services
- Methods: Riots, looting, arson, vandalism, black bloc and political demonstrations

Casualties
- Deaths: France: 1 protester
- Injuries: France: 1,000+ police officers, gendarmes and firefighters 400+ civilians Belgium: 5 police officers Italy: 240 total
- Arrested: France: 2,400+ Belgium: 195; Italy: 60
- Detained: Italy: 271

While many of the initial protests and demonstrations throughout September and October were conducted peacefully, violence escalated over the weekend of 17 October, with looting, arson, and attacks occurring across France, Italy and Belgium.

=== France ===
Storefront of a Nébuleuse Bijoux location in Paris, after being looted

On 17 October, fuel protesters, workers and the yellow vests movement mobilized and joined with student protesters, expanding the nationwide protests to nearly one million people. Many monuments were vandalized, including the Monument à la République in Paris and the Hôtel de Ville, a Monument historique in Limoge which was severely damaged by arson. French Justice Minister Gerald Darmanin announced that since 17 October, police have arrested 7,184 protesters, while courts have also handed down 466 prison sentences.

The riots trace their origins back to mid-September during the fuel and student protests when the yellow vests saw a resurgence on social media, with calls for a general mobilisation against the cost-of-living crisis scheduled for 17 October being shared. Since 18 September, school staff and students in Paris were protesting against poor conditions, with the movement soon spreading nationwide. Originally motivated by cost-of-living concerns, the new Yellow vests movement expanded in reaction to the police brutality faced by student protesters in the preceding weeks.

On 17 October, the convergence of struggles brought together students, parents, teachers, unionists, yellow vests, the far-left, casseurs (hooligans), climate activists, pro-Palestine groups, left-wing parties, social movements and others to participate in nationwide protests and general strikes. According to the Ministry of the Interior, around 550,000 people took part in marches nationwide, including 110,000 in Paris. The organisers, including the General Confederation of Labour put the figure at 800,000. Violence spread as night fell, with groups of people commiting vandalism, looting shops and starting fires in Paris while police responded with tear gas, water cannons and baton charges.

The Hôtel de Ville in Limoges collapsing in flames

Rioting took place in several locations. In Lyon, where about 20,000 people marched, some hooded individuals were seen vandalising a branch of the tourist office, tearing letters from its sign and damaging the premises while another group attempted to invade the building and set it on fire. In Marseille, shops and a municipal police station were damaged while protesters briefly entered the lobby of the city hall. In Limoges, the historic Hôtel de Ville was set ablaze during the evening, which led to the collapse of its roof and bell tower. A demonstrator lost a hand in Saint-Étienne; Interior Minister Laurent Nuñez said that an investigation had been opened but did not confirm reports that the injury was caused by a police grenade. The Associated Press reported that vehicles were set on fire in Paris during clashes between police and protesters, with many shops also being vandalized and looted.

The iFRAP foundation, a French independent think tank and advocacy group, estimated the damage during the riots to be at €1.1 billion, equal to the damage of over eleven days of civil unrest following the killing of Nahel Merzouk in 2023. Around 1,500 shops were severely damaged and a further 3,000 were looted. More than 1,500 fires involving vehicles and public equipment were reported, with around 60 buildings having suffered fire damage. AP reported about 400 arrests throughout the day, while Prime Minister Sébastien Lecornu later said that 1,200 people had been arrested and 150 police officers and gendarmes injured.

On 19 October, Laurent Nuñez submitted his resignation, which President Emmanuel Macron rejected. In the following week, the government banned protests in downtown areas and instituted curfews in major cities across the country. It likewise called upon the police to limit the number of agents on leave during the school vacations in an effort to deploy a 20% larger force across the country. On 13 November, Laurent Nuñez responded to the threat from police unions of a strike unless the risk bonus was increased to 35% (of officers' salary), but the response did not satisfy union representatives. The government announced within two days that it would pay the salaries of employees whose place of work had been pillaged and would establish a support fund for those businesses affected. A riot tax is slated to be added to insurance policies in France starting 1 January 2027.

The city center of Lyon was still off limits to protesters four weeks after the 17 October riots. In Paris, for the 5th of November, the prefecture did not approve the union's proposed itinerary from Place de la Bastille to Place de la Concorde, suggesting an alternate route from Place de la République to Place de la Nation, which had been forbidden two weeks earlier. Major hubs allowing access to Paris from the suburbs were shut down in the afternoon. On 31 October, the Rhone prefecture asked TCL to suspend subway services in Lyon, denying that the request was related to demonstrations, but instead stating that it was intended to "protect several sectors of the city" from "radical groups seeking to cause damage to businesses and public buildings". A G7 summit of interior ministers scheduled to take place at the Rhone prefecture from 20-21 November in Lyon was postponed and relocated to Paris due to the "social climate". Plans for disrupting the summit by groups on Telegram likely led the ministry to make this decision.

While the government initially blamed the "ultra-left" for the violence of 17 October, analysts noted that most of the people convicted from the riots were "opportunistic vandals and looters", most of them with no political leaning. Hundreds of people without criminal records or links to terrorism had their movements restricted by MICAS (mesure individuelle de contrôle administratif et de surveillance, individual measure of administrative control and supervision), an emergency power created in the aftermath of the November 2015 Paris attacks. These measures, which do not require judicial authorization, have been criticized as a way of conflating protest with terrorism.

On 16 November, in his testimony to the lower house's 17 October commission, Paris mayor Emmanuel Grégoire expressed concern about the common impression that there were disparities in law enforcement on 17 October, with police intervening more frequently in western Paris and leaving eastern Paris more open to systematic looting.

=== Belgium ===
In Belgium, the 17 October protests were against the education reforms and rising education costs that the protestors feared would make higher education less accessible. They were primarily focused in Brussels and Liege. 195 people were arrested on Saturday. Inspired by and a direct spillover of the protests in France, it was also a wider anti-austerity movement as the Prime Minister of Belgium, Bart De Wever proposed €10 billion in budget cuts and raising the retirement age to 67. As the protests progressed they grew violent, and Interior Minister of Belgium, Bernard Quintin, said the situation was "no longer simply a protest". "It is pure and simple violence, organized and repeated with the aim of destabilising our society", he wrote in a post on social media, adding that "all necessary measures will be taken to restore order in the face of the rioters".

According to the Belgian police, the protesters started to use electric scooters and construction equipment to block roads and "cause significant damage" in Brussels. Additionally, they reported vandalism and arson by protestors. The Belgian police repeatedly used tear gas and water cannons to break up the protesters.

== Reactions ==
The wave of protests have garnered attention from right-wing and far-right commentators, who claimed the protests and riots are the fault of immigrants, leftists, and malicious actors. Some have argued that the protests and riots have been used to justify 'xenophobic' policies, crackdowns, and the bolstering of militarized police forces.

US president Donald Trump and vice president JD Vance criticized the protests, along with several interior ministers of countries with ongoing protests. Trump blamed the unrest in France on immigration.

Italian Prime Minister Giorgia Meloni defended tougher penalties for rioting and said that nearly half of those stopped or arrested after the Milan riots were of immigrant background. 12 hours later, the Italian council of ministers approved a "security decree" which punishes "violent participation in a demonstration" with 2 to 5 years in prison and a fine up to 20K€.

Germany's Minister of the Interior, Alexander Dobrindt of the Christian Social Union (CSU), as well as Alice Weidel, leader of the Alternative for Germany (AfD), blamed the unrest in France, Italy and Germany on left-wing groups and people from migrant backgrounds. Speaking at the European Parliament in Strasbourg, Weidel also criticized what she labeled "open borders" and called for radical anti-migrant reforms of the European Union.

Hungary's Péter Magyar said the riots in France justified Hungary's tough migration stance.

Following the EU summit in Brussels on 15–16 October, at which he backed a conclusions draft describing migration as "a challenge for the cohesion of our societies", Polish Prime Minister Donald Tusk implied a link between the protests and immigration to Europe while discussing Poland, Italy and Denmark's campaign for a more restrictive EU migration policy, which he said left Spain and France "isolated". He argued Poland's border barrier would protect it from the "violence and social conflict ... we had recently seen in many European capitals", and that Poland "would not pay the price for the errors of other states". Some Polish media sources claimed that no reliable sources attributed the "violent acts" accompanying the protests to immigrants.

Demonstrators assembled on 17 October on Phillips Square in Montreal, Quebec, Canada to express solidarity with the French student protests and protest against low public funding and high tuition costs.

== See also ==
- Revolutions of 1848
- Revolutions of 1830
- Arab Spring
- Gen Z protests in Asia
