= Convergence Party =

The following is a list of political parties whose names (in English) could be referred to as Convergence Party.

- Convergence (Mexico), a political party in Mexico
- Democratic Convergence Party (Cape Verde)
- Democratic Convergence Party-Reflection Group in São Tomé and Príncipe
- Convergence and Union, a coalition of two political parties in Catalonia, Spain
- Democratic Convergence of Catalonia, a political party in Catalonia, Spain
- Convergence for Social Democracy, a political party in Equatorial Guinea
- Anti-Capitalist Convergence, a group of political organizations
- National Convergence, a political party in Venezuela
