= 2026 Italian unrest =

- Part of Gen Z protests, 2026 European unrest and the 2026 Iran war fuel crisis
- From top to bottom, left to right: Piazza Duomo in Milan during the unrest (17 October); police officers deployed in Turin during riots (16 October); blockade of the San Gregorio di Catania motorway toll booth during the protests (20 October); Bologna during the clashes (17 October); truckers’ protest in Sicily (18 October); Piazza Duomo in Milan during the unrest (17 October); empty supermarkets due to the truckers' blockade in Apulia (19 October); demonstrations in Rome (17 October); tractor protest in Apulia (20 October)
- Date: 18 September 2026 – present (2 months and 4 days)
- Location: Italy
- Caused by: High cost of living and rising fuel prices; Discontent within the education sector; Gaza war protests
- Goals: Increased public education funding; Lower military spending and cost of living; Higher wages and better working conditions; Improved public services
- Methods: Demonstrastions, riots, arson, vandalism, looting, traffic obstruction, strike actions, roadblocks
- Status: Ongoing

Parties
| Student movements; OSA; RSM; M1710; Italia in Piazza; Cambiare Rotta; Labour unions; CGIL; FP; FILT; FIOM; CISL; FIT; USB; COBAS; SISA; Political parties and movements; PRC; GC; PaP; RdC; FC; FGC; CARC; PCR; PC; Unaffiliated protesters; Pro-Palestine activists; South Italy truckers, fishermen and agricultural groups | Government of Italy; Polizia di Stato; DIGOS; Polizia Ferroviaria; Carabinieri; Guardia di Finanza; Italian Army; Comune governments; Municipal police; Counterprotesters; Forza Nuova; Lotta Studentesca; CasaPound; Blocco Studentesco; Student Action; Football ultras; Pescara ultras; Lecco ultras |

Casualties
- Injuries: About 314 (maximum estimate, as of October 25th 2026)
- Arrested: About 69 (as of October 25th 2026)
- Detained: About 642 (as of October 25th 2026)
- Charged: About 201 (as of October 25th 2026)

The 2026 Italian unrest is an ongoing series of protests, demonstrations, strikes, and clashes in Italy that began on 18 September 2026. The unrest has involved student movements, labor unions and other protesters expressing discontent over the rising costs of living and fuel prices, education policies and public fiscal spending of the Meloni government.

== Background ==
The unrest emerged amid concerns about the rising cost of living, higher fuel prices, and conditions within the education sector. Student movements criticized the policies of the government led by Prime Minister Giorgia Meloni, calling for increased investment in public education and opposing military spending.

On 16 October, student demonstrations associated with the slogan "No Meloni Day" took place in several Italian cities. The same slogan was used during the 2025 Italian general strikes and protests for Gaza by some groups of protesters.

On 10 October 2026, pro-Palestinian activists and student groups demonstrated in Bologna, holding signs reading "Basta complicità con il genocidio" ("Enough complicity with genocide"), caricatures of Israeli Prime Minister Benjamin Netanyahu and U.S. President Donald Trump, and chanting "Intifada fino alla Vittoria" ("Intifada until victory"), alongside slogans calling for increased education funding and opposing military recruitment.

=== Organisers ===
Italia in Piazza was among the main organisers of the 17 October protests, coordinating demonstrations through regional Telegram groups and promoting them on TikTok and Instagram. Following the unrest, the 17 October Movement emerged as a separate, self-described leaderless network, circulating protest guides, including one inspired by 2011 Egyptian revolution and the Arab Spring. On 24 October, police detained Youssef Siher, suspected of organising the movement. Other demonstrations involved student groups and school occupations, the transport blockade in Italy’s deep south, involving Fedralog in Calabria, the Sicilian Transport Committee (Comitato Trasporto Siciliano) in Sicilia and agricultural organizations including Granosalus and the Matera Agricultural Committee (Comitato Agricolo Materano) in Basilicata.

== Timeline ==
=== 18 September ===
On 18 September, Italian Apple workers went on strike for the entire day, with 1,600 employees in 17 Apple Stores reported to have participated in the strike following worsening work conditions in the stores.

=== 28 September ===
On 28 September, strikes regarding Italy's ports were announced by the Union Sindcale di Base. In Genoa, the strike occurred from 00:30 on 28 September to 00:29 on 29 September. Many other labor unions later called for continued strikes on 2 October.

=== 12-14 October ===
Beginning on 12 October, 21:01 to 13 October at 21:00, railroad services in Palermo and throughout Sicily were disrupted as part of a strike. On 14 October, the Italian General Confederation of Labour announced a general strike in Tuscany, spanning from 09:00 to 17:00.

=== 16 October ===
On 16 October, student demonstrations took place across Italy under the slogan “No Meloni Day”, a nationwide mobilization called on 12 October by the Opposizione Studentesca d’Alternativa (OSA). The protests focused on the condition of school buildings, education funding, military expenditure, immigration policies affecting schools, and solidarity with French students.

Demonstrations were reported in Rome, Milan, Turin, Genoa, Bologna, Florence, Venice, Padua, Treviso, Cagliari and other cities. The nationwide mobilization followed several days of school occupations and student-organized actions.

In Turin, demonstrators threw eggs at police and clashes were reported between some protesters and officers. In Rome, some demonstrators threw firecrackers near the Ministry of Education, while flags of the United States and Israel were burned during a march. In Pisa, students at the Scuola Normale Superiore disrupted an academic-year opening ceremony.

The demonstrations coincided with climate mobilizations involving Fridays for Future and with a school-sector strike. Police unions reported that officers had been injured during confrontations in Rome and Turin. Prime Minister Giorgia Meloni condemned the violence while the government defended the police response.

At the same time, a separate wave of protests by truck drivers and farmers spread across southern Italy in response to rising diesel prices and production costs. In Calabria, the transport stoppage organized by Fedralog began, with approximately 15 protest sites established near major roads and transport hubs, including the port of Gioia Tauro and the area around Lamezia Terme airport. In Sicily, the Comitato Trasporto Siciliano began a five-day stoppage of freight transport services. In Puglia, agricultural and transport protests had already been underway for several days. In the province of Foggia, farmers, olive growers and truck drivers continued their demonstrations. A convoy of approximately 500 lorries travelled along the State road SS379 between Brindisi and Bari, while farmers and agricultural workers participated in demonstrations in Cerignola and other towns. Olive growers also protested in Corato. The stoppages caused traffic disruption and contributed to fuel shortages at service stations in parts of southern Italy. The government called for the restoration of normal goods distribution and sought discussions with transport representatives.

Accusations of media censorship were directed at Italian mass media amid criticism of the limited coverage given by national television news programmes to the ongoing protests in southern Italy. Critics argued that the demonstrations had received disproportionately little attention in mainstream television news, raising concerns about media impartiality and the visibility of public dissent.

=== 17 October ===
A broken shopfront in Milan, Lombardy, due to the riots

On October 17, demonstrations organized by Italia in Piazza took place, addressing the cost of living and other social issues. Riots, looting and vandalism were reported during the protests in Milan, Turin and Bologna, as well as clashes between police and protesters.

In central Milan, a demonstration that had initially proceeded peacefully escalated after groups of masked protesters broke away from the march. Some threw stones and other objects at riot police, damaged shop windows and set fire to makeshift barricades. Police used tear gas to disperse demonstrators in the area around Piazza del Duomo and the Galleria Vittorio Emanuele II. Shops closed and the Duomo metro station was temporarily shut during the clashes.

In Bologna, police used water cannons to disperse demonstrators and arrested seven participants after a protest turned violent. Several people were also reported injured during incidents in Milan, with further arrests being made.

The unrest occurred alongside wider protests over rising living costs and deteriorating public services. The incidents intensified debate about the distinction between peaceful demonstrations and acts of violence.

Meanwhile, the protests by truck drivers and farmers continued in Southern Italy across Calabria, Puglia, Basilicata and Sicily. In Calabria, lorries remained stationed along the Statal route SS18 coastal road and at approximately 15 protest sites. Although the vehicles caused delays, reports indicated that the demonstrations did not consistently involve complete road closures. In Puglia, farmers, olive growers and transport workers maintained a protest site near the Poggio Imperiale motorway junction in the province of Foggia. Some participants discussed taking their demonstrations to Rome to draw the national government's attention to their demands. In Basilicata, agricultural groups, including the Comitato Agricolo Materano and the national association Granosalus, supported demonstrations concerning rising production costs, falling prices received by farmers and reductions in agricultural support payments. Tractors and lorries also remained mobilized near Scanzano Jonico. The agricultural protests still in southern Italy overlapped with the truckers' campaign against diesel prices, although the two movements had distinct demands. Agricultural organizations also announced further demonstrations for the following week, including planned actions in L'Aquila and Rome.

=== 18 October ===
On 18 October, further clashes took place in Milan, following demonstrations held the previous day against rising living costs and inadequate public services.

Without any demonstration or gathering having been planned, several hundred hooded youths, who had organized themselves spontaneously through private and secret social media groups, broke shop windows and set rubbish bins on fire near Piazza del Duomo. Police in riot gear responded with tear gas and water cannons. More than 60 people were taken to police stations for further checks. The majority of those arrested, detained, or reported to the authorities are very young—many are minors, and they include both foreign nationals and second-generation Italians of foreign origin. A police report stated that 28 people had been arrested following the clashes on Saturday, 17 October, in Milan, Bologna, Brescia, Bergamo and Turin. These figures refer to the previous day's incidents, rather than arrests made exclusively on Sunday.

Prime Minister Giorgia Meloni condemned the violence and announced a government meeting for Monday, 19 October, to discuss the situation and possible responses. The clashes increased pressure on the government to address public-order concerns while the protests' underlying economic and social grievances remained a subject of public debate.

At the same time, the transport stoppages in the far south of Italy, in Sicily and Calabria remained in effect as part of the five-day action scheduled to end on 20 October. The protests continued to affect the movement of goods, while shortages of fuel and concerns about deliveries remained significant issues in parts of southern Italy. Farmers' and agricultural associations' grievances in southern Italy continued to centre on diesel prices, rising production costs and the gap between the prices received by producers and the costs of farming. However, available reports do not establish a separate nationwide agricultural strike specifically organized for 18 October. The documented agricultural actions were part of ongoing regional mobilizations.

=== 19 October ===
On 19 October, the Italian government announced plans to send 500 military personnel to Milan following the weekend's unrest. Deputy Prime Minister Matteo Salvini said the deployment would be part of a wider security package. Fearing further violence, shops in Milan's luxury shopping district closed early or boarded up their windows. Police said 271 people had been detained during Sunday's unrest, including 23 minors, and that 32 people had been arrested. Prime Minister Giorgia Meloni condemned the violence, as the government considered further measures to address youth disorder.

==== Foundation of the 17 October Movement (Movimento 17 Ottobre) ====
On 19 October 2026, the 17 October Movement (Movimento 17 Ottobre) emerged publicly in Milan in the aftermath of the protests and clashes that had taken place over the preceding weekend. The newly formed, leaderless movement announced a campaign of permanent mobilization and struggle against the Italian government led by Prime Minister Giorgia Meloni, calling for continued demonstrations every Saturday in several Italian cities until the government's fall. Its announcement was circulated through Instagram, while a Telegram group was used to coordinate communication with supporters. The movement criticized the government and law enforcement, presenting itself as an expression of youth discontent and opposition to the political establishment.

=== 20 October ===
17 October Movement announced its next meeting to be on 24 October 2026 in Milan, Bologna, Turin, Rome, Florence, Padua, Bari, and Genoa. Within its digital chat groups, the movement also circulated and recommended the anarchist text "Recipes for Chaos" (2004) and the self-produced operational guide "Safer in the Streets" (also known as "Revolution: Instructions for Use").

In Calabria, truck drivers and agricultural workers kept up their protests on 20 October over high fuel prices and the rising cost of living. In Vibo Valentia, shops stayed shut and market stalls sat empty as deliveries were disrupted, while residents joined peaceful demonstrations at the Sant'Onofrio crossroads.

The truckers’ protests disrupted the distribution of goods in southern Italy. Some supermarket shelves and fuel pumps in Naples were empty, while shortages of certain food products were also reported in Sicily, Calabria and Puglia. Diesel prices were roughly one-third higher than before the Iran war. Transport Minister Matteo Salvini met with representatives of trucking associations and promised tax credits to offset fuel costs, as well as funding to modernize trucking fees and measures to address operating costs. The disruption also affected food deliveries. Delayed shipments had left perishable goods, including fruit, vegetables, milk and meat, stranded in trucks and warehouses. The protests also disrupted aviation fuel supplies at two regional airports in southern Italy.

=== 22 October ===
Arrival of military vehicles from the 186th Paratroopers Regiment "Folgore" in Milan (23 October 2026)

The neo-fascist party New Force confirmed on 22 October that on 24 October a counterprotest in Forlì was organized against the violence of the previous week. The counterprotest was officially authorized by local law enforcement.

=== 23 October ===
On October 23 2026, following the strengthening of security measures by the government and law enforcement, the 17 October Movement—via a statement released on its social media channels—decided to alter the previously established gathering points, march routes, and final assembly squares for demonstrations scheduled to take place the following day in eight Italian cities. The movement announced that it would disclose the specific meeting points in each city to participants only at the "last minute"—that is, 30 minutes before the originally planned assembly times—specifically designating 14:30 CET for the initial gathering squares and 15:30 CET for the final destination square. This action constituted a violation of the Constitution and the law—specifically Article 17 of the Italian Constitution, which establishes that citizens have the right to assemble peacefully and unarmed. For assemblies in public spaces (such as town squares or city streets), no authorization or permit is required; however, prior notice must be given to the authorities (specifically the Questore, the public security official in charge within a province). The authorities may prohibit an assembly only for proven reasons of public safety or security. Furthermore, it violated Article 18 of the Consolidated Act on Public Security Laws (TULPS), which specifies that "organizers of an assembly in a public space or a place open to the public must provide notice to the Questore at least three days in advance." This is not a request for authorization, but rather a formal notification intended to allow the police headquarters to implement necessary public order measures, such as closing off areas and managing traffic. Football "ultra" fan groups have also mobilized to "protect the streets" and prevent unrest; groups from Lecco (Calcio Lecco 1912)—under the slogan "Lecco is not to be touched"—as well as those from Pescara (Delfino Pescara 1936), Piacenza (Piacenza Calcio 1919), Milan (AC Milan and FC Inter), Carate Brianza (Folgore Caratese), Como (Como 1907), Verona (Hellas Verona), Vicenza (L.R. Vicenza), Rome (AS Roma and SS Lazio), Crema, and Bari have all made themselves available to stand guard over streets and public squares.

On the same day, in the afternoon, 500 military troops, from the 186th Paratroopers Regiment "Folgore", arrived in Milan, bringing drones and VTLM Lince vehicles for potential support operations on the following day. The soldiers do not possess judicial police powers; they cannot detain or arrest individuals, nor are they equipped with handcuffs or tasers. Their role is to guard and secure sensitive sites—such as railway stations, embassies and consulates, public offices, shopping malls and arcades, as well as public squares and monuments—in order to protect them and prevent civil unrest, while simultaneously freeing up police personnel who would otherwise be stationed at these locations. In exceptional and specific circumstances—namely, when a crime is witnessed in progress—they may carry out a "citizen's arrest" (an action permitted to any individual), provided that the detained person is immediately handed over to the judicial police, the competent authority.

At the same time, the blockade by truck drivers and farmers in southern Italy came to an end. The full restoration of pre-blockade conditions was expected to take several weeks.

=== 24 October ===
In the days leading up to the events and during the early hours of the day, all businesses and other establishments in the city centers where the demonstrations were scheduled to take place adopted extreme precautionary measures to prevent acts of vandalism; furthermore, the government confirmed that the protest by the 17 October Movement—following an arbitrary change to the locations of the gatherings and marches, made without any prior notification—was no longer authorized.

1,500 people participated in a right-wing counterprotest dubbed "Sblocchiamo tutto" (Unblock everything), which ended at 15:00 CET in Rome. A protest numbering around 200 highschoolers took place in Turin. At around 15:12 CET a protest numbering hundreads of individual started making its way from Piazza della Repubblica. Meanwhile, in Milan, anti muslim chants started to be chanted by unknown gathering of people that paraded the streets of the city.

By 15:30 CET, whilst in Bologna and Bari the 17 October Movement spots were announced (in the University district of the city in Bologna, and the central area of the city in Bari), Milan's own areas had yet to be announced by then, and no protest had taken place yet. 300 people gathered for the protests in Naples' Piazza Garibaldi by 15:40 CET, some dressed entirely in black.

Various clashes between the police and the protests were recorded in Turin with charges by the police and the protests throwing firecrackers, rocks and glass bottles at law enforcement. Some of the members in the protests were dressed in black and wore a hoodie, whilst some other burnt a photo of PM Giorgia Meloni. In Florence a spontaneous protest occurred. The protest, initially peaceful, erupted in clashes when it met a police contingent in Via Tornabuoni. Clashes occurred from around 17:40 to 21 in the areas of Via Tornabuoni and Ponte Santa Trinita, with protesters throwing bottles and rocks at police officers, who charged the group multiple times.

In Bologna the police charged at the protesters and chased them by pushing them towards Via Marconi, away from Piazza dei Martiri, with a recorded use of a hydrant; a part of the people participating in the protests responded by throwing firecrackers. In Bologna multiple clashes occurred between the police and the protesters, after a group of them separated from the main gathering and headed to via Marconi and Piazza dei Martiri, with rioters throwing bottles, building barricades and setting fire to dumpsters and bikes. Multiple stores were also damaged in the clashes, that went on from the late afternoon until late that evening. In Bologna in total 17 people were injured, including a carabiniere that suffered moderate injuries and a protestor that fell ill and had to be transported to the hospital in an ambulance.

At around 18 CET the various protests in Rome remained fully peaceful, although some of them, expecially the spontaneous ones, escalated later. A group of protesters occupied the Colosseum and then moved towards the Termini Station. At 19:00 CET protests in Rome blocked the entrance to the Termini station causing clashes broke out with the police. At Termini protesters threw bottles, stones, firecrackers and road signs to the police, which activated its hydrants.

By 18:55 CET around 5,000 people were counted at the spontaneous protest in Milan, with people tearing down a Lega manifesto and directing insults at its leader, Matteo Salvini. Protests also occurred in Pescara, where the ultras of Delfino Pescara 1936 formed a counterprotest in the city center. By 19:20 CET it had been reported that two protests in Milan joined together, forming a joint protest of 10,000 people which included pro-Palestinian groups and student protests. Protests, largely peaceful, also occurred in Naples, Bari, Padua and Lucca.

=== 30 October ===
A general strike is indicted by Unione Sindacale di Base (USB) and other trade unions against the rising of the cost of living and military spendings. The organisers claim that around a million people protested across multiple cities nationwide. In Livorno the first sit-ins begun at dawn in the port area, and grew to around 15.000 people at around 11:10 CET. In Bologna some students occupied high schools, while others joined a USB-organised demonstration in Piazza Maggiore. The protestors later moved towards the outskirts of Bologna and occupied the city's ring road. In Naples hundreds of people met in Piazza Mancini, the protestors later moved towards the city's train station and chanted slogans against Giorgia Meloni. Another group of around 20.000 people also occupied the port of Naples and burned photos of Giorgia Meloni and Minister of University and Research Anna Maria Bernini. In Trieste 4.500 workers and students held a protest at the city's port. Around 10.000 people protested in Genoa, and occupied city roads, where tires where burned, and the port. 4.000 people gathered at the USB protest in Pisa, where students also occupied the university. Around a thousand students protested peacefully in Trento and Bolzano. 5.000 people gathered at the anti-war and against the cost of living protest in Palermo. 150 students protested in Aosta. One of the largest protests was held in Milan, in which 100.000 people took part; the protesters blocked highways around the city. Protests were also held in Padua, Novara and Vicenza, in the latter clashes occurred between protesters and police, and three people reamined injured. Multiple southern cities saw protests too, including Bari, Barletta, Taranto, Lecce and Cosenza.

In Rome clashes occurred near Circo Massimo and the government buildings, rioters threw friecrackers and bottles, and set fire to dumpsters.

In Turin the first protest started at around 9:45 CET when a thousand students, teachers and school janitors gathered in front of Palazzo Nuovo. The protest, organised by trade unions and left-wing organisations, later moved towards via Rossini were it tried to force a police block. At around 11 the protest had grown to 50.000 people and moved in front of the city hall, where farmers threw manure in front of the building. Clashes later occurred in Piazza Castello between the police and members of the Askatasuna organisation. In the evening another protest occurred near the Savoy Gardens.

The Capybara Party was recorded as participants during the protests, with a person dressed up as a Capybara who appeared during a TG2 broadcast and the signs brought along by the party becoming viral online.

=== 7 November ===
On November 7, demonstrations organized by Italia in Piazza took place in 11 Italian cities—Turin, Milan, Rome, Bologna, Genoa, Florence, Lecce, Udine, Cremona, Brescia, and Ancona. As is often the case, the protests focused on the high cost of living, rising fuel and rent prices, cuts to education and healthcare, wars, rearmament policies, and military spending. No significant tensions were reported during the day. Upcoming demonstrations are scheduled for Saturday, November 14, Friday, November 20—coinciding with the national general strike called by the CGIL and Friday, December 4, 2026 for the second national general strike called by various organizations united under the Sindacati di Base.

=== 14 November ===
On November 14, demonstrations organized by the "Italia in Piazza" (Italy in the Square) movement took place in some Italian cities—including Turin, Milan, Parma, and Brescia—to address the high cost of living and other social issues; no incidents were reported. Further demonstrations are scheduled for Friday, November 20—coinciding with a national general strike called by the CGIL trade union. Additionally, local protests organized by the CGIL and the "Unione Sindacale di Base" (USB) are set for November 16, 17, and 18. On Friday, December 4, a second national general strike will take place, called by various organizations under the banner of "Sindacati di Base" (Grassroots Unions), followed on Saturday, December 5, by a national demonstration for the healthcare sector and an "Italia in Piazza" protest against the high cost of living. On Saturday, December 12, a national demonstration organized by the USB and "Italia in Piazza" will address the high cost of living and rearmament, while on Friday, December 18, a national strike in the education sector has been called by the union "La Voce dei Giusti" (The Voice of the Righteous).

=== 20 November ===
On 20 November, mobilisations, protests and strikes took place in more than 100 cities throughout Italy, as organised by the CGIL. About 1 million people attended the nationwide protests. Many protesters held demonstrations to adress the cost of living rise, stagnant wages as well as the government's failure to fund public services. CGIL leader Maurizio Laudini has said "Today is a very important day because young protesters are taking to the streets not just in Italy but across Europe". Protesters clashed with the police in Rome, Bologna and Turin.

== Response ==
=== Government security measures ===
Italy has rolled out a new "security decree" to crack down on violent protests. Under the plan, a new offence—"violent participation in a demonstration"—would carry up to five years in prison and a fine of as much as €20,000 (around $22,500). The penalties get tougher if protesters hide their faces or if anyone gets hurt. The decree also makes protesters foot the bill for any damage they cause. Parents would be held responsible for damage done by their underage children. On top of that, anyone over 14 would automatically be presumed to understand what they're doing unless proven otherwise—a call that used to be left to a judge. The government also promised more beds in detention centres and more judges for the juvenile justice system. Parliament now has 60 days to turn the decree into law.

==== Matteo Salvini ====
Deputy Prime Minister Matteo Salvini, leader of the right-wing League party, announced a 500-strong deployment of military forces on social media. "From words to action: another 500 more troops to defend Milan," he wrote. Salvini claimed that the rioters had deliberately set out to clash with police and rejected economic hardship as any kind of justification. "This is not social distress," he said, and instead called for tougher laws that would allow minors to be held preventively and arrests to be made based on video footage of looters.

=== Requests of reparations ===
General Roberto Vannacci, leader of the far-right neo-fascist National Future party argued for a zero tolerance policy on vandalism during the protests and proposed that the rioters were to pay for the damages inflicted on private and public property during the protests.

=== Propaganda and disinformation ===
On October 19, 2026, Monica Castro, a local city councillor for Calenzano representing the National Future party, posted a digitally altered image of a student demonstration on her social media accounts. The original photograph, taken during a student protest in Cagliari, showed demonstrators holding a banner that read "Soldi alla scuola, non alla guerra" ("Money for school, not for war"). In the version shared by Castro, the banner had been modified using artificial intelligence software to display a grammatically incorrect slogan: "Soldi alla scuola, Meloni ha casa" (using the verb "ha" [has] instead of the preposition "a" [to/at/go]). Castro captioned the post with the ironic comment, "Andateci. A scuola" ("Go there. To school"). Critics and media outlets pointed out that the image was a fabricated counterfeit intended to misrepresent the students as uneducated and discredit the motivations of the protest.

== Analysis ==
Donatella della Porta, a sociologist and political scientist, connected these protests to a lifetime of crises experienced by Generation Z; including austerity, climate change, and the COVID-19 pandemic. She notes that the protests against the Gaza genocide provided these youth with a vital opportunity for social interaction after years of isolation from the pandemic, forging a powerful social bond that has led to the coining of the term "Gaza Generation"; which in turn contributed to the 2026 Italian unrest and the wider protests in Europe.

== See also ==
- 2026 French student protests
