= Capybara Party =

Capybara Party Partito Capibara
- Abbreviation: PC
- Founder: No founder
- Founded: September 2022
- Preceded by: CNA (Accelerationist Nomadic Circle)
- Membership (March 2026): c. 70
- Ideology: Left-wing accelerationism; Gratuitism; Luxury communism
- Political position: Far-left

Website
- https://www.partitocapibara.it/it
- Mascot of the political movement

The Capybara Party (Italian: Partito Capibara) is an Italian political movement founded online in September 2022. (Note: The party was formerly called "Potere al Capibara!" (English: Power to the Capybara!"), a play on the name of the far-left Potere al Popolo party.) Characterized as a post-work and anti-capitalist movement, the group advocates for a radical restructuring of society through automated production and the redistribution of wealth, explicitly pulling inspiration from the concept of "fully automated accelerationist luxury communism." The political movement uses the capybara as its main symbol.

== History ==
=== Origins ===
The Partito Capibara developed out of the Italian accelerationist milieu surrounding the Circolo Nomade Accelerazionista (CNA), a political-cultural collective based in Bologna. A 2023 history of accelerationism published by Cicles Magazine dates the CNA's emergence to 2019 and describes it as one of the Italian collectives that helped disseminate left-accelerationist ideas, with the influence of Alex Williams' and Nick Srnicek's philosophy creeping in their ideology and work, such as in the 2022 "L'Era dell'abbondanza" (The era of abundance).

A post of the original Circolo Nomade Accelerazionista's 2022 mock election showing precursor group "Potere al Capibara!" alongside competing candidates, including the victor "Partito xenocomunista dei postlavoratori".

The Partito Capibara itself appears to have originated in September 2022. According to an account published in 2026 by I simboli della discordia, a website created by former head of the Termometro Politico newspaper and political science researcher Gabriele Maestri, members of the CNA organised an online mock election "game" during the 2022 Italian general election campaign. Beginning on 6 September, eight fictional lists competed in a tournament on Instagram, each with a symbol and basic programme. The competition was explicitly framed as an exercise in "hyperstition", a term associated with accelerationist thought referring broadly to ideas, narratives or fictional constructs that can help bring about the reality they describe One of these was Potere al capibara! (Power to the Capybara!), which subsequently developed into the Partito Capibara. The competition concluded on 8 October 2022 and Potere al Capibara! did not win. The winning list was the Partito xenocomunista dei postlavoratori (Post-worker's Xenocommunist Party), whose programme included a maximum twelve-hour working week, a universal basic income of €2,000 per month, a €24 hourly minimum wage, extensive automation, free public transport, abolition of domestic utility bills and a maximum wealth threshold.

=== Transformation ===
"Real" gatherings outside the internet began in 2022, under the slogan Raduniamo ciò che è sparso (Let us converge what is scattered). La Repubblica also reported that the political group was systematically drawing graffitis which stated "Luxury for all" in central Bologna back in 2022. By 2026, the project was presenting itself publicly as a political movement rather than merely an internet meme, and showed its willingness to participate in the next Italian general elections, expected for 2027. Its official website set a target of 120,000 signatures as a preliminary step toward the physical signature collection necessary for presenting a list at the 2027 elections, reaching over 10,000 signatures by August 2026.

In March 2026 the party was presented to the public for the first time in Bologna under the name "Partito Capibara". What followed were meetings in April 2026 in cities such as Padua, Bologna, Florence and Milan. Between 9 July and 12 July of 2026 the party organized the "Mark Fisher Party" initiative which would take place between the city of Rome and Latina and was aimed as an event of philosophical and political exchange and debate. On 24 June 2026 the party organized a real life rally in Padua, drawing the participation of hundreads of people. The party was recorded as one of the participant parties during the 2026 Italian unrest, with a person dressed up as a Capybara who appeared during a TG2 broadcast and the signs brought along by the party becoming viral online.

== Symbols ==
=== Capybara ===
Back in 2021 capybaras raided the city of Nordelta, roughly 30 kilometers from Buenos Aires, Argentina, occupying luxury residences and urban areas where their natural habitat once was. This event inspired those who later formed Partito Capibara, who decided to use it as a symbol in the 2022 hyperstitious Instagram elections, and later on as the symbol of their political movement and projected party.

=== Flotilla ===
The party was metaphorically described by Dibitonto as a "flotilla-party", aimed at "hijacking the enemy's ship", thus the italian parliament. The term "flotilla-party" and its use as a symbol also mirrors the intent of the party, which Dibitonto stated to be equivalent of that of the Global Sumud Flotilla as it does not believe to be the "boat that can stop Israel" and instead wants to use the journey itself as to awaken conscience about the ideals it portrays.

== Ideology ==
=== Roots ===
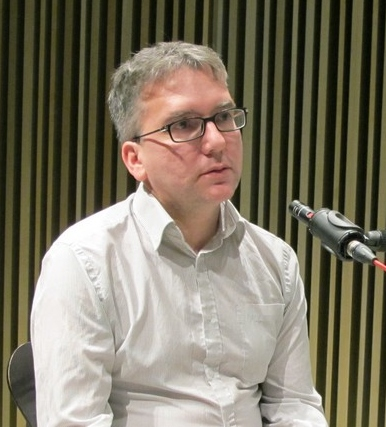
Mark Fisher, one of the main inspiration for the political movement's ideology, back in 2011

According to Davide Dibitonto, one of the principal promoters of the Partito Capibara and one of the co-founders of the CNA, the intellectual roots of the project predate the formation of the collective by several years. In an interview published in 2026, Dibitonto placed the origins of the broader political project approximately ten years earlier and identified the British accelerationist literature associated with Maya B. Kronic, Armen Avanessian, Nick Srnicek, Alex Williams and, above all, Mark Fisher, as important influences. In particular, he cited #Accelerate: The Accelerationist Reader (2014) and Inventing the Future (2015) as important reference points. The party also adopted the model through which left-wing accelerationism made its way into Italy, that is, according to Dibintonto, memes, with one of the examples of such phenomenon being the Facebook community Sinistralibro and groups such as Automatizzato Comunismo Memetico (Automated Memetic Communism). Despite using irony as a tool, the party is serious about its ideals and program.

=== Political placement ===
Davide Dibitonto defined the movement as on the opposite end of the political spectrum as Roberto Vannacci's National Future, stating that whilst Vannacci's party embodied the radical right, Partito Capibara embodied the radical left. According to a militant of the party interviewed by the newspaper Quotidiano Nazionale, Lorenzo Robin Frosini, Partito Capibara is also ideologically distant from the Five Star Movement due to its anti-systemic ideals which, according to the account, the Five Star Movement do not share. The party also expressed support for the recognition of Palestine and support pro-Palestinian organizations.

=== Secondary analysis ===
The newspaper Quotidiano Nazionale described the ideals of the party as akin to Thomas More's book, Utopia.

== Proposals ==
The ideological framework of Partito Capibara centers on a 24-hour, 4-day working week alongside a guaranteed net minimum wage of €15 per hour (€1,560 monthly). To decouple human survival from "endless labor", the movement proposes the unconditional free provision of six fundamental needs: housing, utilities, food, public transit, education, and healthcare. These initiatives are designed to be funded by a universal basic income of 500 per month scaling alongside economic automation, and a strict wealth tax, approximated by the party at 100%, levied on individual assets exceeding €6.66 million. As a practical example, without naming him directly, (Note: At the time of the statement, Giovanni Ferrero had €48,8 - €49 billion to his name, making him the individual who was likely indirectly mentioned in the example. However, the richest man in Italy at the time of the statement was actually Giancarlo Devasini, with a net worth of € 89.3 billion) the political movement stated that the richest man of Italy which at the time of the statement had €49 billions, under this wealth tax system would see a wealth tax of 99,9999% of his individual assets, and even then, according to the party, he'd remain a multimillionaire.

When questioned by Pagella Politica on the feasibility of their program, with the network stating it was "too good to be true", Davide Dibitonto replied by stating the program was "too good not to be true". A goal of the party is to become the biggest party in Italian politics by 2032.
