= Anti-Capitalist Convergence =

Anti-Capitalist Convergences (ACC) are organizations which sprang up in North America in the late 1990s and early 2000s as forms of coordinating activities by the growing social justice, anarchist, and environmentalist anti-capitalists. Many of the ACCs were set up in anticipation of or as a result of a major protest.

Generally, Anti-Capitalist Convergences were assembled as umbrella organisations, to coordinate different groups and struggles. However, many have become groups unto themselves. In the wake of the "Battle of Seattle" and a similar resurgence of anti-capitalist protest and organising, activists in cities such as Seattle; Washington, D.C.; and Chicago formed Convergences to carry out protests more effectively and to ensure that anti-capitalist organising would continue after major demonstrations had left the city. The Convergences were also billed as a counterweight to more mainstream coalitions and trade unions who radicals claimed dominated protests.

By far the most successful of the Anti-Capitalist Convergences has been the one, based in Montreal, best known by its French acronym: CLAC (Convergence des Luttes Anti-Capitalistes). Originally formed to coordinate protests at the Quebec City Summit of the Americas in April, 2001, it continued to operate afterwards, and provided the engine for the Take the Capital! protests the following year. It has also proven strong within its own community, launched anti-gentrification campaigns, and worked to help non-status immigrants.

As quickly as many ACCs sprung up, most of them have fallen apart. Montreal; Seattle; Colorado; Chicago; New York City; and Washington, D.C., have all seen their ACCs collapse. However, there are now ACCs active overseas in the Philippines and Japan and efforts are under way to revive an anti-capitalist umbrella group in Montreal.

== See also ==
- Convergence of struggles
