= Alfred Leclerc =

- Born: 10 December 1843
- Occupation: Architect
- Awards: Chevalier of the Legion of Honour (1892)

Charles Alfred Leclerc (10 December 1843 – 9 April 1915) was a French architect.

First grand prix de Rome in 1868, he was the chief architect of the Palace of Versailles from 1881 to 1887.

== Biography ==
After studying at the École des Beaux-Arts, Alfred Leclerc competed for the Prix de Rome in 1868. Its subject is a Calvary including a Scala Santa and a Stations of the Cross, a program considered "particularly anachronistic by some". He won the first grand prize, a reward that allowed him to be admitted as a resident at the Villa Medici from 1869 to 1872. During this stay, he carried out numerous works and surveys of ancient sites in Rome, in particular the plans and elevations (still frequently reproduced) of the Baths of Titus built on the ruins of the Domus aurea.

His submissions were nevertheless discussed by architectural professionals, who underlined his "boldness" and "dubious taste". In 1870, Le Moniteur des architectes perfidiously pointed out that waiting a few more years to send Alfred Leclerc to Rome "would have been better for his work, his talent and for the public".

Back in France, Alfred Leclerc, well established in official circles, made a name for himself in the construction of many public buildings. In 1878, thanks to his support, he won the contract for the development of the Capitole de Toulouse: the contract was directly entrusted to him by Paris to close fifty years of procrastination in Toulouse and two competitions (1840 and 1844) to which the municipality had never followed up. Between 1879 and 1883, he was sent to build his most important building — nowadays, his most often cited work — the town hall of Limoges, the Hôtel de Ville, a vast building in the neo-Renaissance style, with a campanile and façade decorated with mosaic medallions representing famous Limousins.

An illustration of the prolific and official architect of the early Third Republic, Leclerc came to be a respected architect. In 1881, he was appointed chief architect of the Palace of Versailles. Charles Gosselin, chief curator from 1882, did not create any obstacle for him insofar as he lost interest in Versailles, which he considered to be an exile. Leclerc only stayed in place for six years, enough to carry out serious work. Pierre de Nolhac cites in particular his important work on the Neptune Basin — its lead pipes and the repairs of vases and shells. Moreover, Nolhac spoke of the restoration of the basin (the construction site was not completed until 1889, after Leclerc's departure).

Leclerc was then appointed architect of the Parc de Saint-Cloud, which burned down in 1870 and, in the end, was totally deconstructed and destroyed under his tenure in 1892.

He died in 1915, aged 72.

== Distinctions ==
- Chevalier de la Légion d'honneur (awarded 4 January 1892)

== Bibliography ==
- Leclerc, Alfred (1899). Le bassin de Neptune à Versailles. p. 48.
