= Hôtel de Ville, Limoges =

Hôtel de Ville
- The main frontage of the Hôtel de Ville in May 2026

General information
- Type: City hall
- Architectural style: Renaissance Revival; Louis XIII style
- Location: Limoges, France
- Coordinates: 45.8265°N 1.2604°E
- Construction started: 1879
- Opened: 14 July 1883; 143 years ago

Height
- Height: 43 m (141 ft) (before the campanile collapsed)

Design and construction
- Architect: Alfred Leclerc

Monument historique
- Official name: Hôtel de ville et Fontaine
- Type: Inscrit
- Designated: 1975
- Reference no.: PA00100361

The Hôtel de Ville (French pronunciation: [otɛl də vil], "City Hall") in Limoges is a municipal building in Haute-Vienne department, France, which stands on Place Jacques Chirac. The hall's architecture and style is inspired by the building with the same name in Paris. Completed in 1883 by architect Alfred Leclerc, the building was designated a monument historique the French government in 1975. On 17 October 2026, the building was severely damaged by arson during the nationwide civil arrest of the 17 October 2026 riots, and the arsonist is suspected to be a suspect linked to a far-left movement.

== History ==
=== Background ===
By the Middle Ages, the city was managed by consuls based in an ancient town hall on the Rue Fontgrouleu (now Rue du Consulat), dated as early as 1487.

Following the outbreak of the French Revolution, the old building was permanently abandoned and a new town hall established. The site the council selected for the new building was a former convent on the Place Saint-Gérald, built over an ancient Roman forum. This town hall was a simple two-storey building with a central bell tower, completed in 1811. On 4 April 1871, inspired by the establishment of the Paris Commune, a crowd of revolutionary guardsmen stormed both the town hall and the prefecture, and demanded the establishment of a similar commune in Limoges. In the ensuing melee, shots were fired and Colonel Auguste Billett of the French Army was mortally wounded; the Army eventually regained control.

=== Current building ===
After a local resident, Alfred Fournier, died and left his entire estate to the city in July 1875, the council decided to demolish the old town hall and erect a new building on the same site. Winner of the Grand Prix de Rome and former chief architect of the Château de Versailles, Charles-Alfred Leclerc, was commissioned for the project. Construction commenced in 1879 and the building officially opened on 14 July 1883.

In May 1940, during the Second World War, Mayor of Limoges Léon Betoulle, welcomed the prime minister of Belgium, Hubert Pierlot, and other members of the Belgian government in exile to the town hall. Following the death of the former president of France, Jacques Chirac, in September 2019, the address of the town hall was changed to the Place Jacques Chirac in 2022.

=== 2026 arson attack ===
The Hôtel de Ville in Limoges collapsing in flames

During the 17 October riots, the town hall was attacked by rioters, who stormed the building and threw firebombs inside. According to Mayor Guillaume Guérin, after entering the building perpetrators threatened to kill officials and security guards. The bell tower and roof were consumed by flames and collapsed into the building. Firefighters reported that they were able to save four-fifths of the building, but partial collapse of the structure remained possible. Guérin said he would resign unless the French government paid for the reconstruction. Prime Minister Sébastien Lecornu responded that the state would pay for the reconstruction and the continuation of local services in Limoges.

On 20 October, specialised RAID forces arrested 34-year-old activist and suspect Hodei Ciarra Docampo in the nearby town of Val d'Issoire. He had been known for a history of violence.

Fire at the Hôtel de Ville (17 October 2026)

The day after the fire (18 October 2026)

== Architecture ==
Inspired by the Hôtel de Ville, Paris, Leclerc designed the building in the Neo-Renaissance and Louis XIII styles, with a symmetrical château-style main frontage of 11 bays facing onto the Place Jacques Chirac. The central section featured a series of tall carriage arches on the ground floor, fenestrated by tall casement windows with balustrades on the first floor. At roof level, there was a parapet, which was decorated with four medallions, and a central clock tower with an ornate belfry, which stood at 43 metres (141 ft) high before the 2026 fire. The end sections of three bays each were fenestrated in a similar style and surmounted by separate mansard roofs. The medallions on the parapet were created by Giandomenico Facchina and depicted the painter Léonard Limosin, the former chancellor Henri François d'Aguesseau, the statesman Pierre Victurnien Vergniaud, and the military leader Jean-Baptiste Jourdan. The two pediments on either side of the clock were surmounted by statues, sculpted by Tony Noël, representing the industries of goldsmithing and enamelling. A stone fountain, designed and sculpted by Charles Genuys, was installed in front of the town hall in 1893.

Leclerc incorporated the Neo-Renaissance influence into the interior of the building, with a pink-marble floored reception hall anchored by a sweeping double-flight grand staircase. Murals by Henri-Paul Motte, including Passé et Présent: union du Limousin à la France par Henri IV (exhibited at the 1884 Paris Salon) and L'Atelier de Léonard Limosin (1885), as well as paintings by Abel Trinocq, Jean-Joseph Weerts, and Urbain Bourgeois were hung throughout the building.

Pediment

City coat of arms

Entrance

Allegory of goldsmithing

Allegory of enamelling

Bell tower
