= Italia in Piazza =

Student movement in Italy

Italy in the Square Italia in Piazza
- Logo of the movement
- Leader: Leaderless
- Founded: September/October 2026
- Membership: 4,073 members
- Ideology: Apolitical apartitism

Italia in Piazza is a Generation Z and Generation Alpha student grassroots movement created in late 2026. The group organized protests during the 2026 Italian unrest and were amongst the parties in the 17 October riots. The movement split sometime after the 17 October riots, the split group forming the 17 October Movement. The movement is leaderless and rejects classical party-systems.

== History ==
=== Origins ===
The movement was founded when various people commented under a TikTok video which analyzed European political issues of the time and described activism across Europe. The users came to a common agreement that a similar movement was needed in Italy, leading to the creation of a WhatsApp group 3–4 days after such discussions.

=== Activity ===
On 4 October 2026 the official Instagram page of the movement had been created calling for the organization of peaceful protests across the nation. By 7 October they had participated on some of the national-level protests. On 10 October 2026 the Milanese branch of the movement was created.

Il Sole 24 Ore defined the group as one of the main organizers of the protests between 16 October and 17 October. Some time after the 17 October riots, a part of the movement split away, creating the 17 October Movement. During the 17 October riots fragmentation during the Italia in Piazza protest had already been recorded, with "very young" individuals "taking over" the situation which "degenerated", according to Sky TG24.

On 19 October 2026, it had been reported by Open that during the 17 October riots, sixteen members were arrested, nine of which were minors; In the following days the authorities called to the police stations up to 72 individuals, 44 of them minors, most of them with no criminal history, and a significant chunk of them were second-generation immigrants.

Despite describing Italia in Piazza's actions and past protests as peaceful and "less worrisome" then the 17 October Movement, RAI News described the messages and slogans spread by the group comparable in violent rhetoric as the latter as the 24 October's protest date approached. The party stated it was planning a nation-wide boycotting campaign which would aim at delaying or temporarily stopping the payment of electric bills. After a Telegram poll the movement decided to no longer participate in the protests on 24 October 2026, stating that they believed there would be new violent episodes and that if any member still decided to participate, they'd be doing so individually and wouldn't represent the group.

== Structure ==
On 24 October Il Fatto Quotidiano released an article claimed that the group had a total of 19 Telegram chats by then, a total of 6 admins and a single founder. The network originated as a WhatsApp group before moving to Telegram on 8 October. By 19 October, its national Telegram group had 4,073 members, while researcher Lorenzo Alvisi estimated approximately 9,000 users across 40 groups and pages. According to Alvisi, Telegram coordinated activities, while TikTok drove the movement. A protest guide inspired by the 2011 Egyptian revolution and the Arab Spring also circulated on Telegram, although its authorship and official status remained unclear.

== Ideology ==
Il Post described the member of the movement's Telegram group as mostly pacifist and opposed to violence, although, the newspaper noted, that there were some violent elements within the movement which composed the minority.

=== Stated goals ===
The movement states it calls for national unity on dialogue. The movement claims it is openly inclusive to LGBTQ+ individuals and people from any religious and ethnic background. The movement also stated its opposition in the classical party-system, and favors "empowering" individual citizens through various grassroots initiatives.

== Demographics ==
The average age of the group, according to VDNews, was of 21–22 years old as of 20 October 2026.

== Analysis ==
Researcher Lorenzo Alvisi commented that the decentralized online grassroots organization used by Italia in Piazza was the first of its kind in Italy.
