= 17 October Movement =

Spontaneous political movement in Italy

17 October Movement Movimento 17 Ottobre
- Logo of the movement
- Leader: Leaderless
- Ideology: Anarchism, Anti-fascism
- Website: https://www.instagram.com/movimento17ottobre/ (Official Instagram page) (Note: The group proclaimed its existence, program and channels through its Instagram page, functioning as its main official channel)

The 17 October Movement (Italian: Movimento 17 ottobre, abbreviated as M1710) is a spontaneous anarchist youth political movement, composed of members of Generation Z and Generation Alpha, that emerged in Milan in October 2026. The movement was formed in the aftermath of violent clashes between student protesters and law enforcement on 17 October 2026, and split from Italia in Piazza.

Operating without a formal leadership structure or official spokespeople, the collective advocates for permanent mobilization through grassroots assembly and direct action. The inherent violent nature of the group is debated amongst sources with contrasting opinions. Anonymous members which were interviewed stated that they did not condemn violent actions which took place during the 2026 Italian unrest.

== Background ==
The 17 October Movement emerged in October 2026 within the context of nationwide civil unrest in Italy driven by protests against public service degradation and the rising cost of living amongst various other causes. Following the riots, a distinct political faction detached itself from Italia in Piazza to form the movement, establishing its presence online via social media platforms.

== History ==
=== Foundation ===
On 19 October 2026 the group announced their creation on their Instagram account where they also offered to assist people who had problems with the law enforcement at the protest, inviting people to join a Telegram group. The movement also declared that they'd be meeting every Saturday up until the Meloni government would have fallen. The movement then announced its next meeting to be on 24 October 2026 in Milan, Bologna, Turin, Rome, Florence, Padua, Bari, and Genoa. The movement also distributed copies of the 2004 book "Recipes for Chaos" and its own book "Safer in the Streets."

=== Activities ===
On 20 October 2026 it had already been reported that elements within the Telegram group of the site started to suggest moving to Signal as to avoid mediatic attention and to achieve better privacy standards. On that date the movement had roughly 3,000 members on Telegram.

On 23 October 2026, following security reinforcements by the government and law enforcement, the movement decided to withdraw its previously planned locations and stated that it would communicate three gatherings in each city they operated in at the "last moment", specifically at 14:30 CET, 30 minutes before they had planned their gathering in their original places. On the same day a 29-year-old member from Genoa was subjected to a personal and home search, seizing his computer and cell phone. On that date the movement had reached almost 7,000 members on Telegram.

On 24 October 2026, a 30-year-old Italo-Moroccan journalist, pro-Palestinian activist and research trainee at the ISPI Observatory on the Middle East and North Africa from Brescia, was identified by authorities as the founder of the movement and brought to a police station after being caught whilst at a friend's house. A guide titled “Revolution, Instructions for Use” circulated in the movement's Telegram chats. Inspired by the 2011 Egyptian revolution and the Arab Spring, it advised on clothing, tear gas protection and tactics for confronting police. Sky TG24 reported that its authorship and official status were unclear. The movement also cited leaderless protests in Egypt, Tunisia, Hong Kong, Sudan, Algeria, Lebanon and Chile as models. On the evening of 24 October, Siher was detained on orders from Milan prosecutors on suspicion of incitement to commit crimes with terrorist intent and organising violence at demonstrations. His wife was placed under investigation for the same suspected offences.

== Ideology ==
Based on media coverage, sources are divided regarding the movement's association with violence. Il Fatto Quotidiano and Il Risveglio described the group in its early stages as factionalized between a reformist wing and a maximalist wing, characterizing the latter as prone to violence and influenced by the political models of Karl Marx and the French Revolution. Conversely, Corriere della Sera reported that the movement was divided between debating students and automated accounts, noting that the student faction reportedly rejected proposals for violent action whenever they were introduced. In an interview by TgCom24, an anonymous member of the movement described the attacks on shops in central Milan as a consequence of the "irrational anger" stemming from the material conditions of certain individuals. The member did not condemn the actions and stated that future targets chosen by the movement and the public would be approached more "rationally."

Bertolt Brecht was cited various instances within the channels of the movement, specifically his quote "He who fights risks losing, he who doesn't fight has already lost" embraced by some members, despite its role as a possible ideological influence being unknown.

=== Manifesto ===
The manifesto of the 17 October Movement was published on its Instagram page on 19 October 2026 and is divided into nine points. These consist of distrust in the Meloni government due to its alleged authoritarian tendencies, distrust in opposition political parties and syndicates (which the group characterizes as part of the institutional system it opposes and accuses of instrumentalizing protests) as well as decentralization, anti-fascism, and the transformation of public square protests into areas for debating ideas so that participants can take their future into their own hands.

== Reaction ==
=== Popular reaction ===
According to Il Giornale, the creation of the group led to the public reacting by spreading fake news, developing extreme caution and terror; especially amongst merchants. The newspaper added that whilst some of these messages were tied to terrorized group of people, some fake news were studied to specifically increase the popular tension.
