= Convergence of struggles =

French concept of social movements

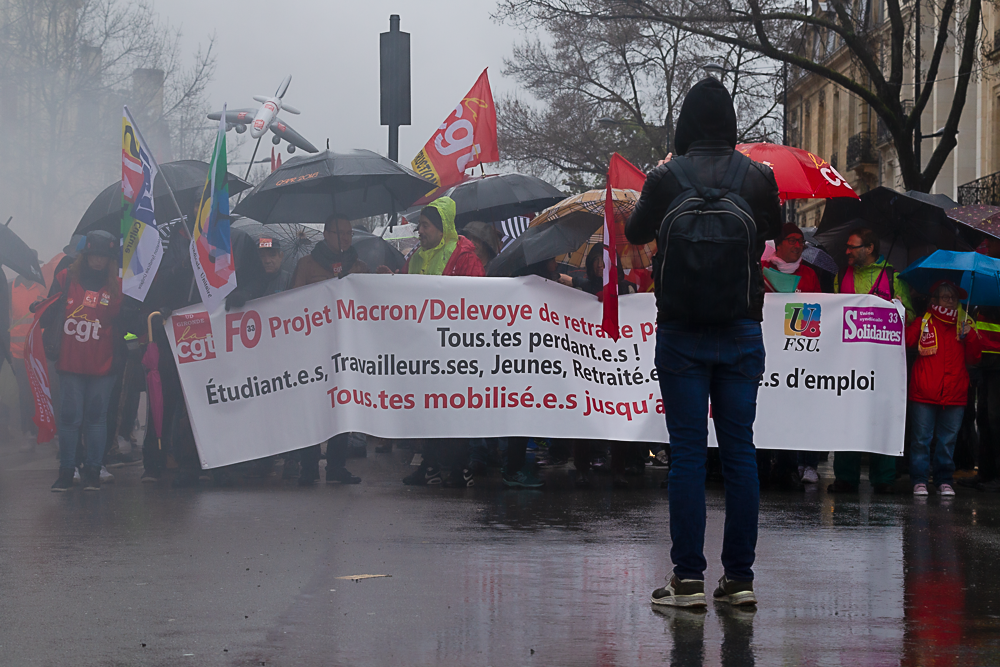
Protestors in France carrying a banner calling for a general mobilisation.

The convergence of struggles (French: Convergence de luttes) is a concept that emerged in the trade unionism and social movements of France to denote the confluence of different groups with different demands in a common movement. It aims to bring together different struggles in a common social movement.

== Definition and characteristics ==
Political scientist Jérôme Fourquet, director of the Opinion Department at the French Institute of Public Opinion (IFOP), presents the convergence of struggles in these terms: "It is necessary for broad segments of the population to recognize themselves in the struggle waged by another segment." According to the then French Minister of Higher Education, Frédérique Vidal, "it is a slogan and an old dream for some."

For the French political columnist Thomas Legrand, it is an "old dream of revolutionary essence that arises in every period of social tensions"; however, "we should speak rather of coexistences of struggles that have advanced scattered demands, but that have never achieved, at least in the 20th century, a total overthrow of power."
