= History of France =

The first written records for the history of France appeared in the Iron Age. What is now France made up the bulk of the region known to the Romans as Gaul. Greek writers noted the presence of three main ethno-linguistic groups in the area: the Gauls, Aquitani and Belgae. Over the first millennium BC the Greeks, Romans and Carthaginians established colonies on the Mediterranean coast and offshore islands. The Roman Republic annexed southern Gaul in the late 2nd century BC, and legions under Julius Caesar conquered the rest of Gaul in the Gallic Wars of 58–51 BC. A Gallo-Roman culture emerged, and Gaul was increasingly integrated into the Roman Empire. In the later stages of the empire, Gaul was subject to barbarian raids and migration. The Frankish king Clovis I united most of Gaul in the late 5th century. Frankish power reached its fullest extent under Charlemagne. The medieval Kingdom of France emerged from the western part of Charlemagne's Carolingian Empire, known as West Francia, and achieved increasing prominence under the rule of the House of Capet, founded in 987. The monarchy initially wielded only limited authority, but Philip II of France brought the Angevin Empire to an end by defeating a coalition of his rivals at the Battle of Bouvines in 1214. Following this victory, France became the most prosperous and powerful kingdom in Europe.

A succession crisis in 1328 led to the Hundred Years' War between the House of Valois and the House of Plantagenet. The war began in 1337 following Philip VI's attempt to seize the Duchy of Aquitaine from its hereditary holder Edward III of England, the Plantagenet claimant to the French throne. A notable figure of the war was Joan of Arc, a French peasant girl who led forces against the English, establishing herself as a national heroine. The war ended with a Valois victory in 1453, strengthening French nationalism and increasing the power and reach of the French monarchy. During the Ancien Régime over the next centuries, France transformed into a centralized absolute monarchy through the Renaissance and Reformation. At the height of the French Wars of Religion, France became embroiled in another succession crisis, as the last Valois king, Henry III, fought against factions of the House of Bourbon and House of Guise. Henry, the Bourbon King of Navarre, won and established the Bourbon dynasty. A burgeoning worldwide colonial empire was established in the 16th century.

By the mid-17th century, France had emerged as the dominant hegemonic power in Europe, building Europe's strongest army, engaging in a series of wars, and undergoing a period of artistic and scientific development. In the late 18th century the monarchy and associated institutions were overthrown in the French Revolution. The Revolutionary Tribunal executed political opponents by guillotine, instituting the Reign of Terror (1793–94). The country was governed as a Republic, until Napoleon's French Empire was declared in 1804. Following his defeat in the Napoleonic Wars, France went through regime changes, being ruled as a monarchy, then Second Republic, then Second Empire, until a more lasting French Third Republic was established in 1870.

During World War I, France played a decisive role in defeating the Central Powers as part of the Triple Entente, while participating in the majority of the war's major battles fought on the Western Front. France during World War II was one of the Allied Powers but was conquered by Nazi Germany in 1940. The Third Republic was dismantled, and most of the country was controlled directly by Germany, while the south was controlled until 1942 by the collaborationist Vichy government. Following liberation in 1944, the Fourth Republic was established. France slowly recovered and enjoyed a baby boom that reversed its low fertility rate. Long wars in Indochina and Algeria drained French resources and ended in political defeat. In the wake of the 1958 Algerian crisis, Charles de Gaulle set up the French Fifth Republic. Into the 1960s most of the French colonial empire became independent, while smaller parts were incorporated into the French state as overseas departments and collectivities. Since World War II France has been a permanent member in the UN Security Council and NATO. It played a central role in the unification process after 1945 that led to the European Union. It remains a strong economic, cultural, military and political factor in the 21st century.

== Prehistory ==
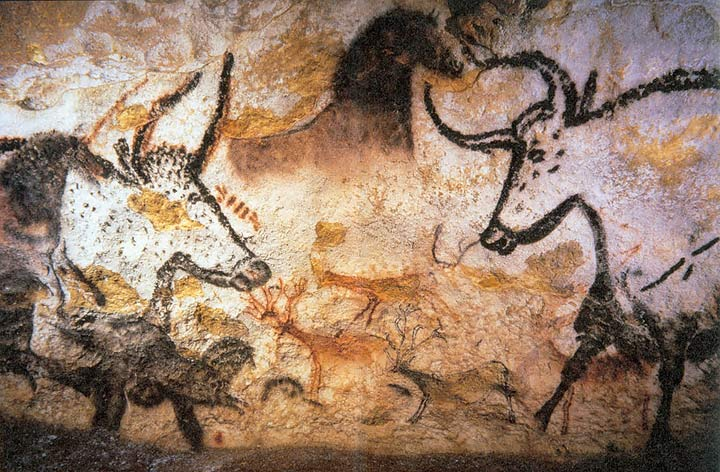
Cave painting in Lascaux, 15,000 BC

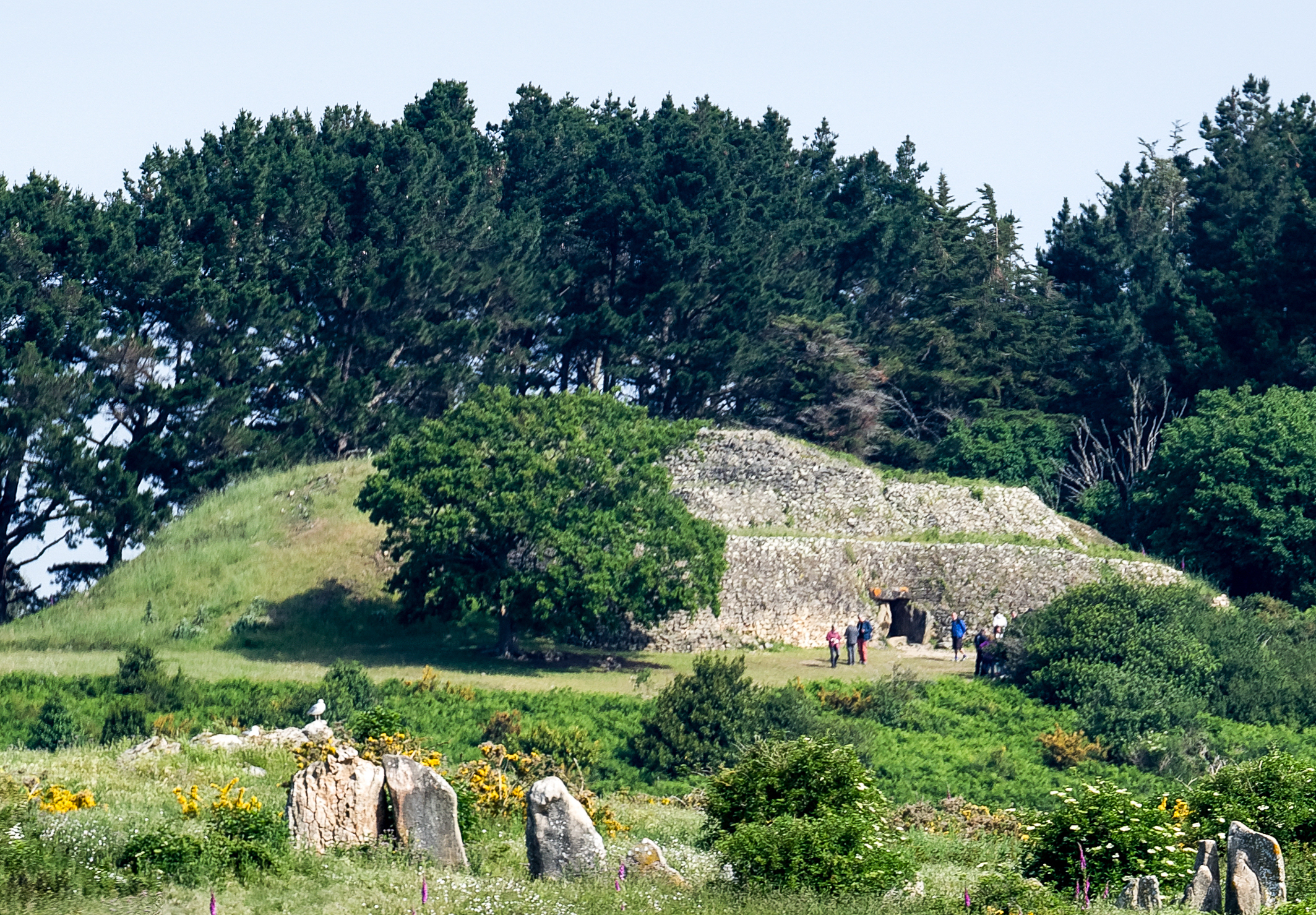
Gavrinis megalithic tomb, Brittany, 4200-4000 BC

Stone tools discovered at Chilhac and Lézignan-la-Cèbe indicate that pre-human ancestors may have been present in France at least 1.6 million years ago. Neanderthals were present in Europe from about 400,000 BC but died out about 40,000 years ago, possibly out-competed by modern humans during a period of cold weather. The earliest evidence of modern humans in France was found at the Mandrin Cave and has been dated to between 56,800 and 51,700 years ago.

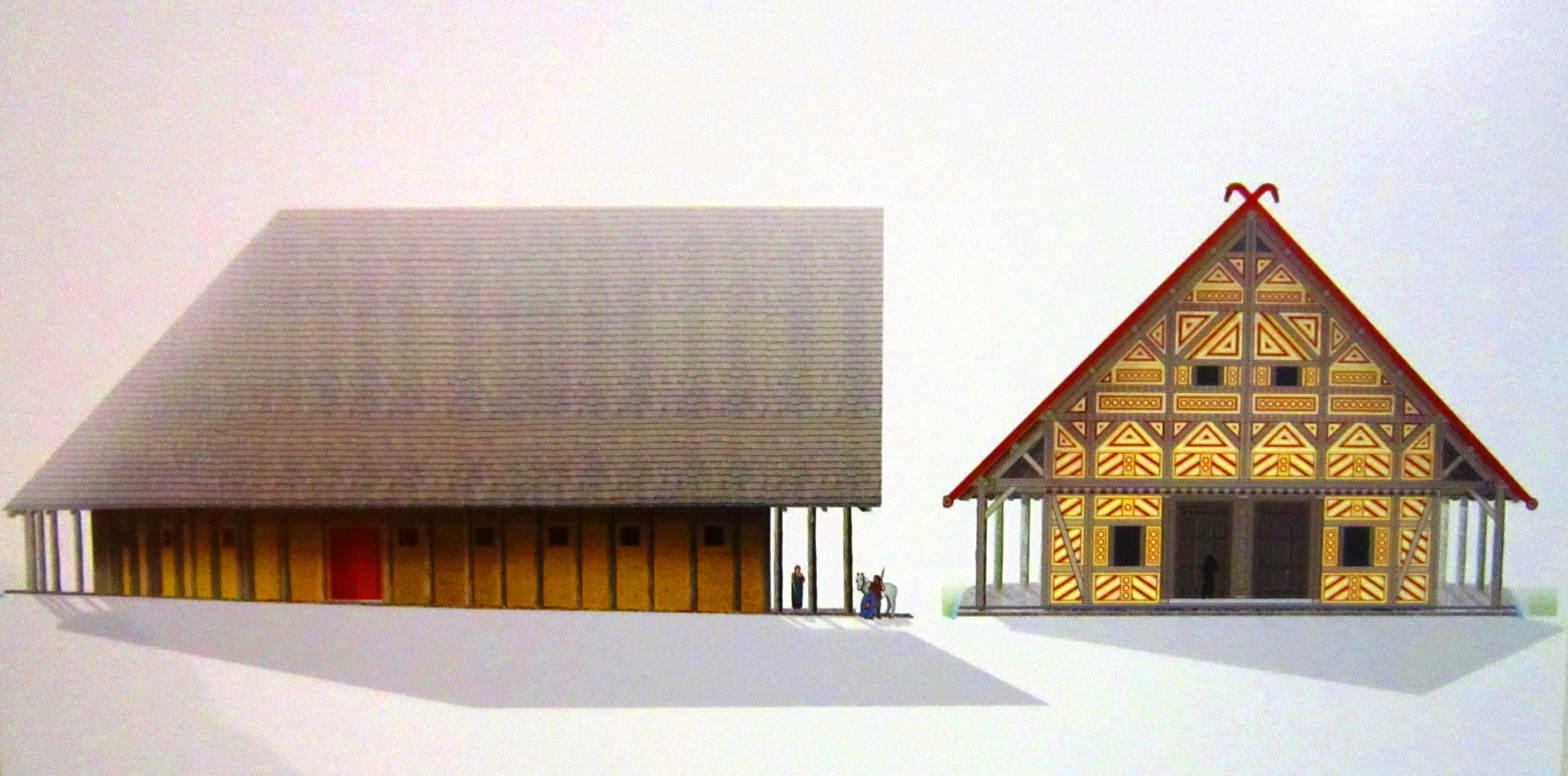
Vix palace, Hallstatt culture, central France, 6th century BC

In the Chalcolithic and early Bronze Age the territory was largely dominated by the Bell Beaker culture, followed by the Armorican Tumulus culture, Rhône culture, Tumulus culture, Urnfield culture and Atlantic Bronze Age culture, among others. The Hallstatt culture and La Tène culture developed during the Iron Age, during which the first written records for the history of France appear.

== Ancient history ==
=== Greek colonies ===
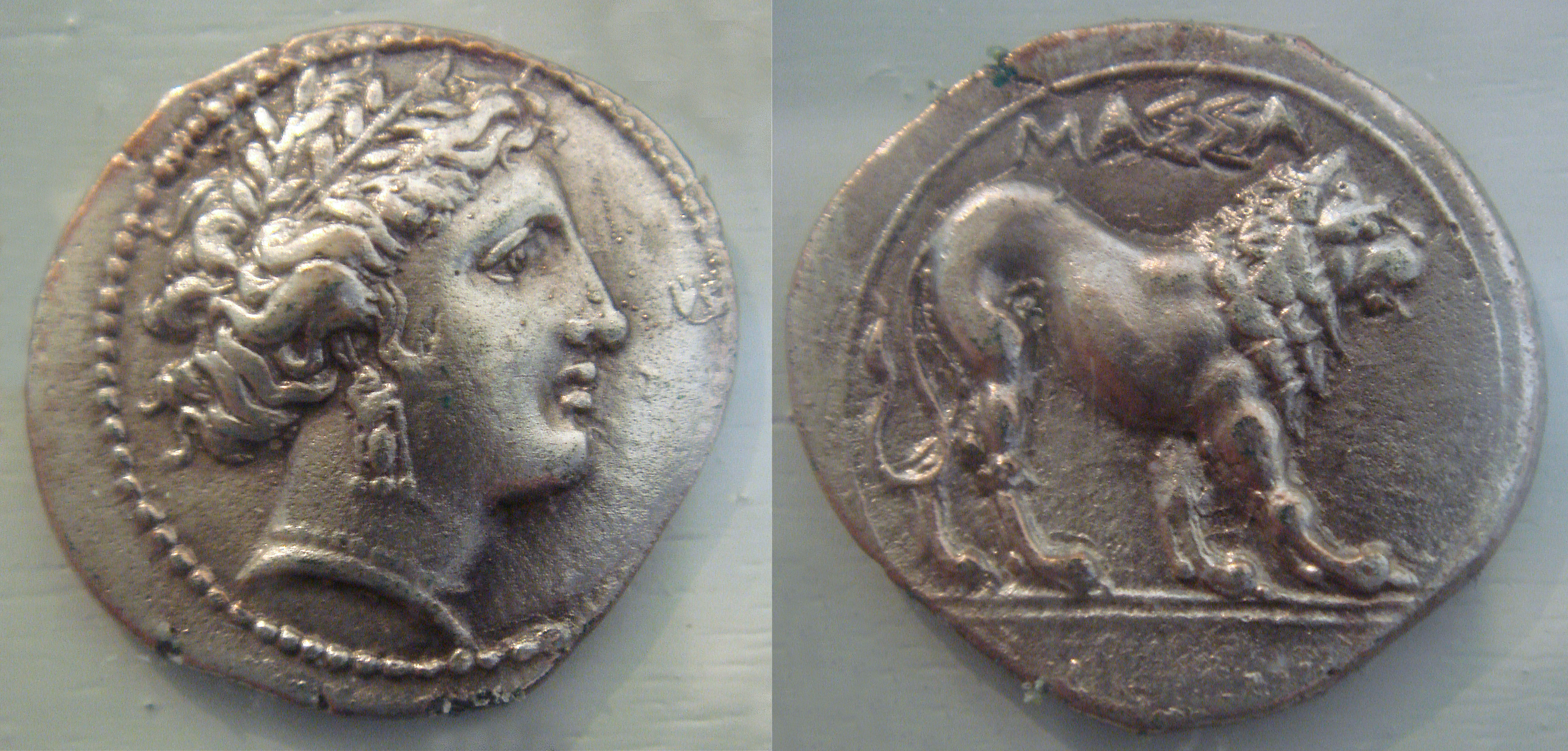
Massalia (modern Marseille) Greek silver coin, 5th–1st century BC

In 800 BC, Ionian Greeks founded the colony of Massalia (present-day Marseille) on the shores of the Mediterranean Sea, making it one of the oldest cities in France. At the same time, some Celtic tribes arrived in the eastern parts (Germania Superior) of the region and spread to the rest of France between the 5th and 3rd century BC.

=== Gaul ===
Covering large parts of modern-day France, Belgium, northwest Germany and northern Italy, Gaul was inhabited by many Celtic and Belgae tribes of whom the Romans referred as Gauls and who spoke the Gaulish language roughly between the Oise and the Garonne, according to Julius Caesar. On the lower Garonne the people spoke Aquitanian, a Pre-Indo-European language related to (or a direct ancestor of) Basque whereas a Belgian language was spoken north of Lutecia but north of the Loire according to other authors like Strabo. The Celts founded cities such as Lutetia Parisiorum (Paris) and Burdigala (Bordeaux) while the Aquitanians founded Tolosa (Toulouse).

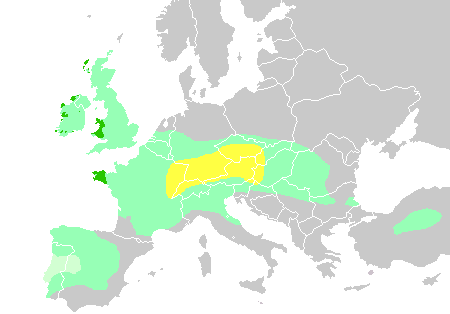
Celtic expansion in Europe, 6th–3rd century BC

Long before any Roman settlements, Greek navigators settled in what would become Provence. The Phoceans founded important cities such as Massalia (Marseille) and Nikaia (Nice), bringing them into conflict with the neighboring Celts and Ligurians. The Celts often fought with Aquitanians and Germans, and a Gaulish war band led by Brennus invaded Rome following the Battle of the Allia.

However, the tribal society of the Gauls did not change fast enough for the centralized Roman state. The Gaulish tribal confederacies were defeated by the Romans in battles such as Sentinum and Telamon during the 3rd century BC. In the early 3rd century BC, some Belgae (Germani cisrhenani) conquered the surrounding territories of the Somme in northern Gaul after battles supposedly against the Armoricani (Gauls) near Ribemont-sur-Ancre and Gournay-sur-Aronde, where sanctuaries were found.

When Carthaginian commander Hannibal fought the Romans, he recruited several Gaulish mercenaries who fought on his side at Cannae. It was this Gaulish participation that caused Provence to be annexed in 122 BC by the Roman Republic. As the Consul of Gaul, Julius Caesar conquered all of Gaul. Despite Gaulish opposition led by Vercingetorix, the Gauls succumbed to the Roman onslaught. The Gauls had some success at first at Gergovia but were ultimately defeated at Alesia in 52 BC. The Romans founded cities such as Lugdunum (Lyon), Narbonensis (Narbonne) and allowed in a correspondence between Lucius Munatius Plancus and Cicero to formalize the existence of Cularo (Grenoble).

=== Roman Gaul ===
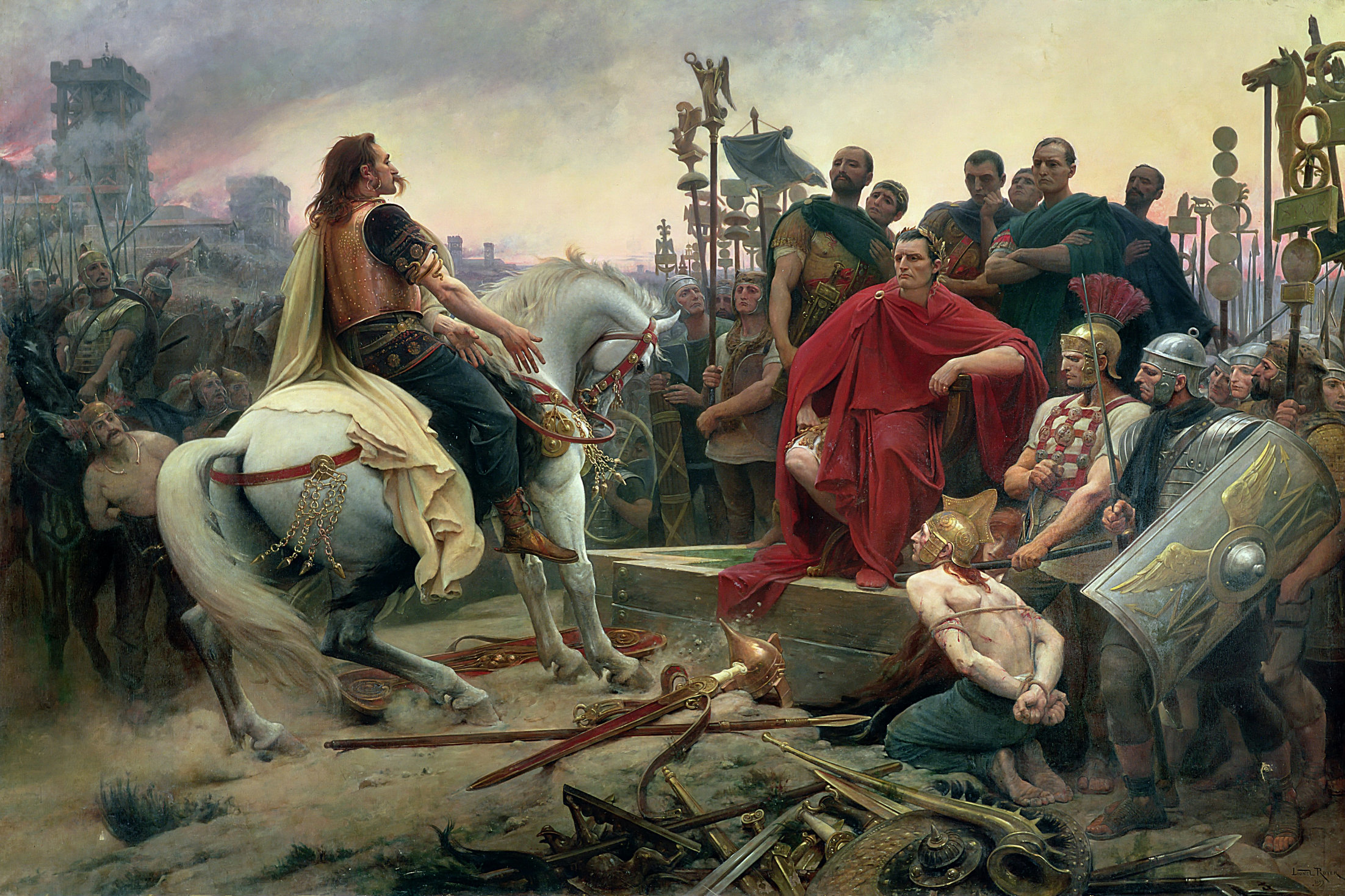
Vercingetorix throws down his arms at the feet of Julius Caesar after the Battle of Alesia. Painting by Lionel-Noël Royer, 1899.

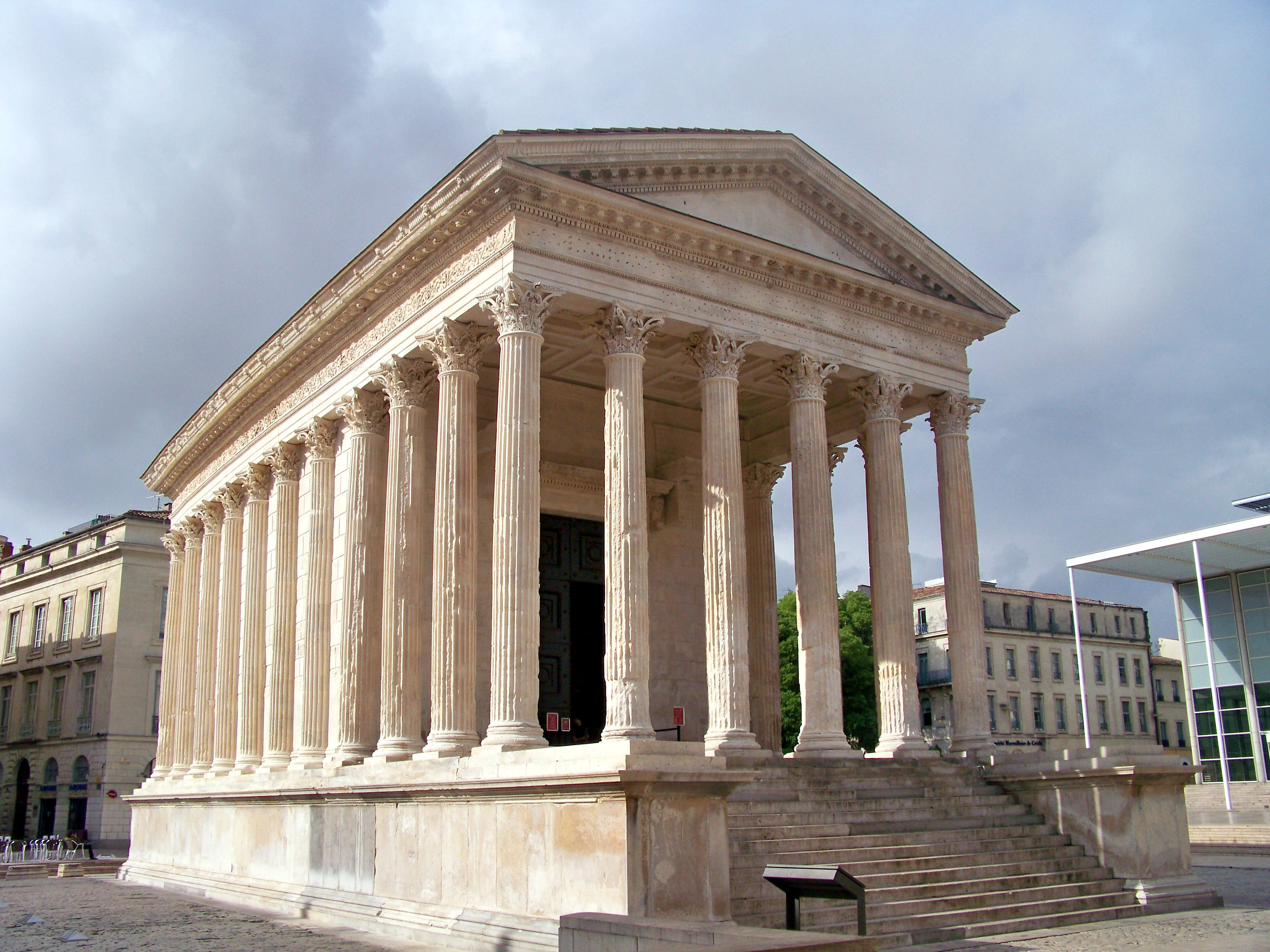
Roman Temple at Nîmes

Gaul was divided into several different provinces. The Romans displaced populations to prevent local identities from becoming a threat to Roman control. Thus, many Celts were displaced in Aquitania or were enslaved and removed from Gaul. There was a strong cultural evolution in Gaul under the Roman Empire, the most obvious one being the replacement of the Gaulish language by Vulgar Latin. It has been argued the similarities between Gaulish and Latin favoured the transition. Gaul remained under Roman control for centuries, and Celtic culture was then gradually replaced by Gallo-Roman culture.

The Gauls became better integrated with the empire with the passage of time. For instance, generals Marcus Antonius Primus and Gnaeus Julius Agricola were both born in Gaul, as were emperors Claudius and Caracalla. Emperor Antoninus Pius also came from a Gaulish family. In the decade following Valerian's capture by the Persians in 260, Postumus established a short-lived Gallic Empire, which included the Iberian Peninsula and Britannia. Germanic tribes, the Franks and the Alamanni, entered Gaul at this time. The Gallic Empire ended with Emperor Aurelian's victory at Châlons in 274.

A migration of Celts occurred in the 4th century in Armorica. They were led by the legendary king Conan Meriadoc and came from Britain. They spoke the now extinct British language, which evolved into the Breton, Cornish, and Welsh languages. In 418 the Aquitanian province was given to the Goths in exchange for their support against the Vandals. Those same Goths had sacked Rome in 410 and established a capital in Toulouse.

The Roman Empire had difficulty integrating all the barbarian newcomers—with whom foederati treaties were concluded—within the empire, and generals as Flavius Aëtius had to use these tribes against each other in order to maintain some Roman control. He first used the Huns against the Burgundians, and these mercenaries destroyed Worms, killed king Gunther, and pushed the Burgundians westward. The Burgundians were resettled by Aëtius near Lugdunum in 443. The Huns, united by Attila, became a greater threat, and Aëtius used the Visigoths against the Huns. The conflict climaxed in 451 at the Battle of Châlons, in which the Romans and Goths defeated Attila.

The Roman Empire was on the verge of collapsing. Aquitania was definitely abandoned to the Visigoths, who would soon conquer a significant part of southern Gaul as well as most of the Iberian Peninsula. The Burgundians claimed their own kingdom, and northern Gaul was practically abandoned to the Franks. Aside from the Germanic peoples, the Vascones entered Wasconia from the Pyrenees, and the Bretons formed three kingdoms in Armorica: Domnonia, Cornouaille and Broërec.

== Frankish kingdoms (486–987) ==
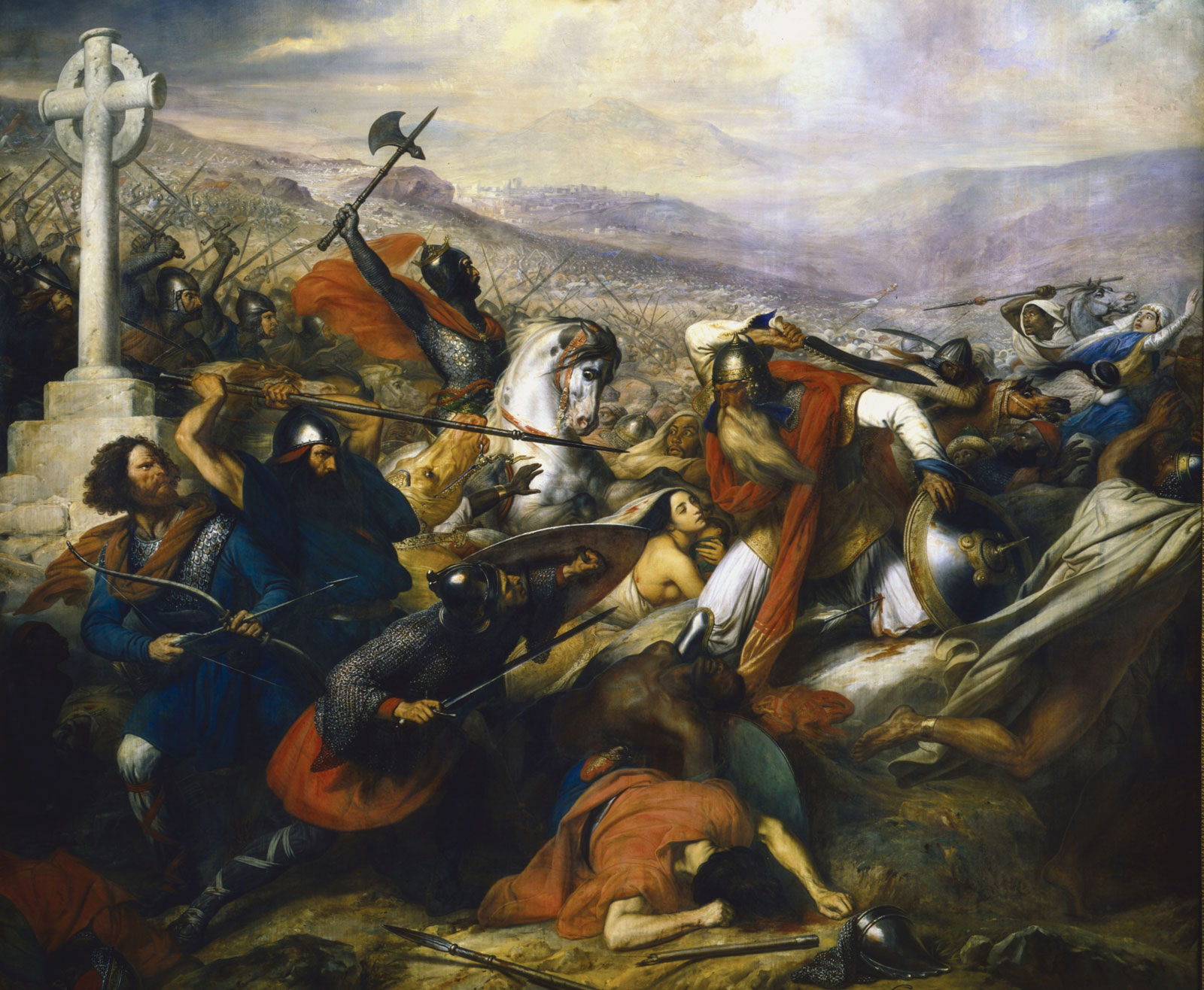
Victory over the Umayyads at the Battle of Tours (732) marked the furthest Muslim advance and enabled Frankish domination of Europe for the next century.

In 486 Clovis I, leader of the Salian Franks, defeated Syagrius at Soissons and subsequently united most of northern and central Gaul under his rule. Clovis then recorded a succession of victories against other Germanic tribes such as the Alamanni at Tolbiac. In 496 Clovis started a war against the Goths in Aquitanië, which was mainly aimed for gathering loot. It took the Gothic king Alaric II two years to push back the Franks. In 507 a second war started. This time, Clovis defeated Alaric at Vouillé and annexed Aquitaine, and thus Toulouse, into his Frankish kingdom. After his victory the pagan Clovis adopted Catholicism. This gave him greater legitimacy and power over his Christian subjects and granted him clerical support against the Arian Visigoths.

The Goths retired to Toledo in what would become Spain. Clovis made Paris his capital and established the Merovingian dynasty but his kingdom did not survive his death in 511. Under Frankish inheritance traditions, all sons inherit part of the land, so four kingdoms emerged: centered on Paris, Orléans, Soissons, and Rheims. Over time, the borders and numbers of Frankish kingdoms were fluid and changed frequently. Also during this time, the mayors of the palace, originally the chief advisors to the kings, became the real power in the Frankish lands; the Merovingian kings were reduced to little more than figureheads.

By this time Muslims had conquered Hispania, and Septimania became part of the Al-Andalus, which threatened the Frankish kingdoms. Duke Odo the Great defeated a major invading force at Toulouse in 721 but failed to repel a raiding party in 732. The mayor of the palace, Charles Martel, defeated that raiding party at the Battle of Tours and earned respect and power within the Frankish Kingdom. The assumption of the crown in 751 by Pepin the Short (son of Charles Martel) established the Carolingian dynasty as the kings of the Franks.

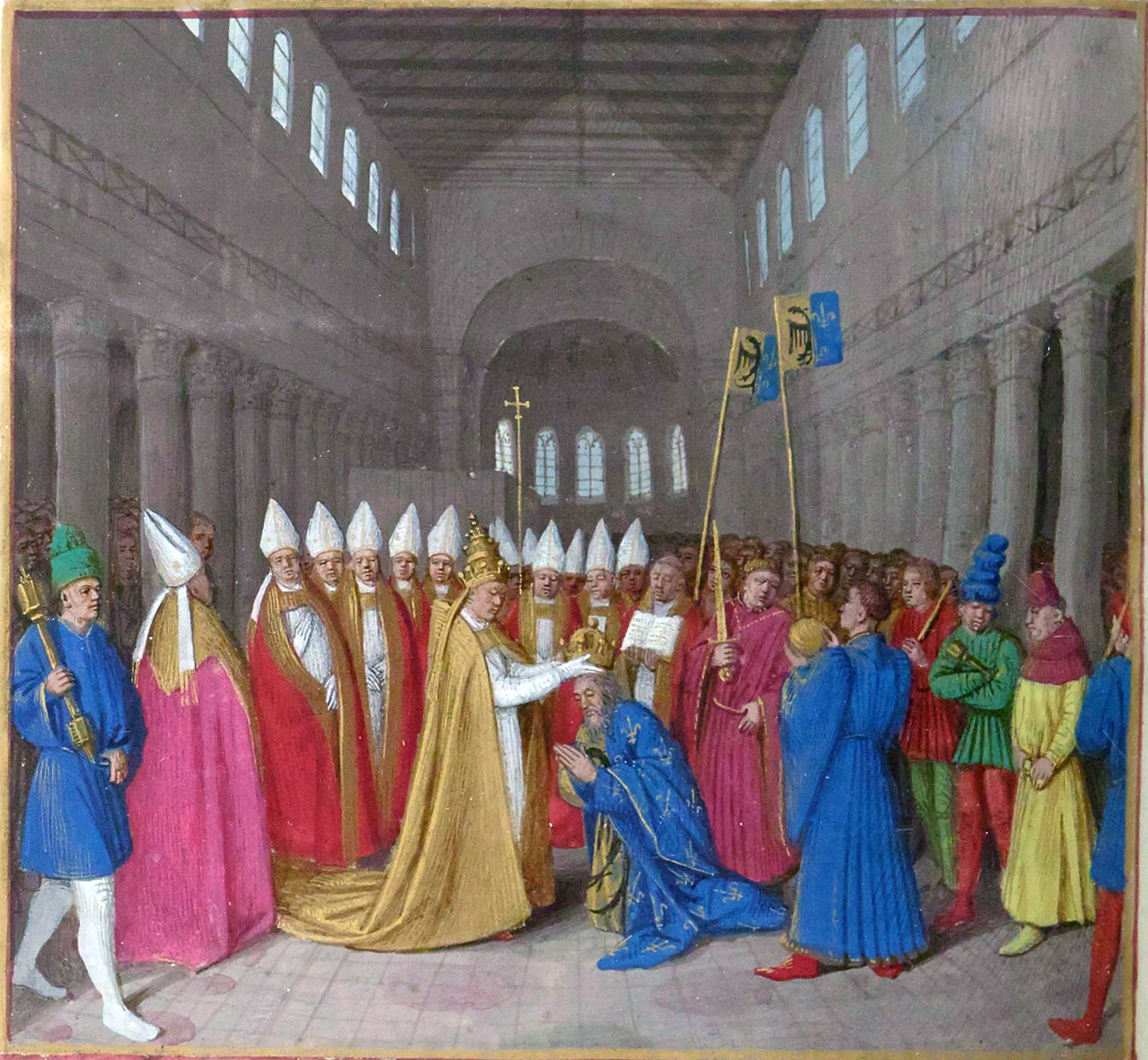
The coronation of Charlemagne (painting by Jean Fouquet)

Carolingian power reached its fullest extent under Pepin's son Charlemagne. In 771 Charlemagne reunited the Frankish domains after a further period of division, subsequently conquering the Lombards under Desiderius in what is now northern Italy (774), incorporating Bavaria (788) into his realm, defeating the Avars of the Danubian plain (796), advancing the frontier with Al-Andalus as far south as Barcelona (801), and subjugating Lower Saxony after a prolonged campaign (804).

In recognition of his successes and his political support for the papacy, Charlemagne was crowned Emperor of the Romans by Pope Leo III in 800. Charlemagne's son Louis the Pious kept the empire united; however, this Carolingian Empire would not survive Louis' death. Two of his sons—Charles the Bald and Louis the German—swore allegiance to each other against their brother Lothair I in the Oaths of Strasbourg, and the empire was divided among Louis's three sons (Treaty of Verdun, 843). After a last brief reunification (884–887), the imperial title ceased to be held in the western realm, which was to form the basis of the future French kingdom. The eastern realm, which would become Germany, elected the Saxon dynasty of Henry the Fowler.

Under the Carolingians, the kingdom was ravaged by Viking raiders. In this struggle, some important figures such as Count Odo of Paris and his brother Robert rose to fame and became kings. This emerging dynasty, whose members were called the Robertians, was the predecessor of the Capetian dynasty. Led by Rollo, some Vikings had settled in Normandy and were granted the land, first as counts and then as dukes, by King Charles the Simple in order to protect the land from other raiders. The people that emerged from the interactions between the Viking aristocracy and the already mixed Franks and Gallo-Romans became known as the Normans.

== State building into the Kingdom of France (987–1453) ==
=== Strong princes ===
France was a very decentralised state during the Middle Ages. The authority of the king was more religious than administrative. The 11th century in France marked the apogee of princely power at the expense of the king when states like Normandy, Flanders or Languedoc enjoyed a local authority comparable to kingdoms in all but name. The Capetians, as they were descended from the Robertians, were formerly powerful princes who had successfully unseated the weak Carolingian kings. The Capetians in a way held a dual status of king and prince; as king they held the Crown of Charlemagne and as Count of Paris they held their personal fiefdom, best known as Île-de-France.

Some of the king's vassals would grow sufficiently powerful that they would become some of the strongest rulers of western Europe. The Normans, the Plantagenets, the Lusignans, the Hautevilles, the Ramnulfids, and the House of Toulouse successfully carved lands outside France for themselves. The most important of these conquests for French history was the Norman Conquest by William the Conqueror.

An important part of the French aristocracy also involved itself in the Crusades, and French knights founded and ruled the Crusader states. The French were also active in the Iberian reconquista to rechristianize Muslim Spain and Portugal. The Iberian reconquista made use of French knights and settlers to repopulate former Muslim settlements that were sacked by conquering Spanish or Portuguese Christians.

=== Rise of the monarchy ===
The monarchy overcame the powerful barons over ensuing centuries and established absolute sovereignty over France in the 16th century. Hugh Capet in 987 became "King of the Franks" (Rex Francorum). He was recorded to be recognised king by the Gauls, Bretons, Danes, Aquitanians, Goths, Spanish and Gascons.

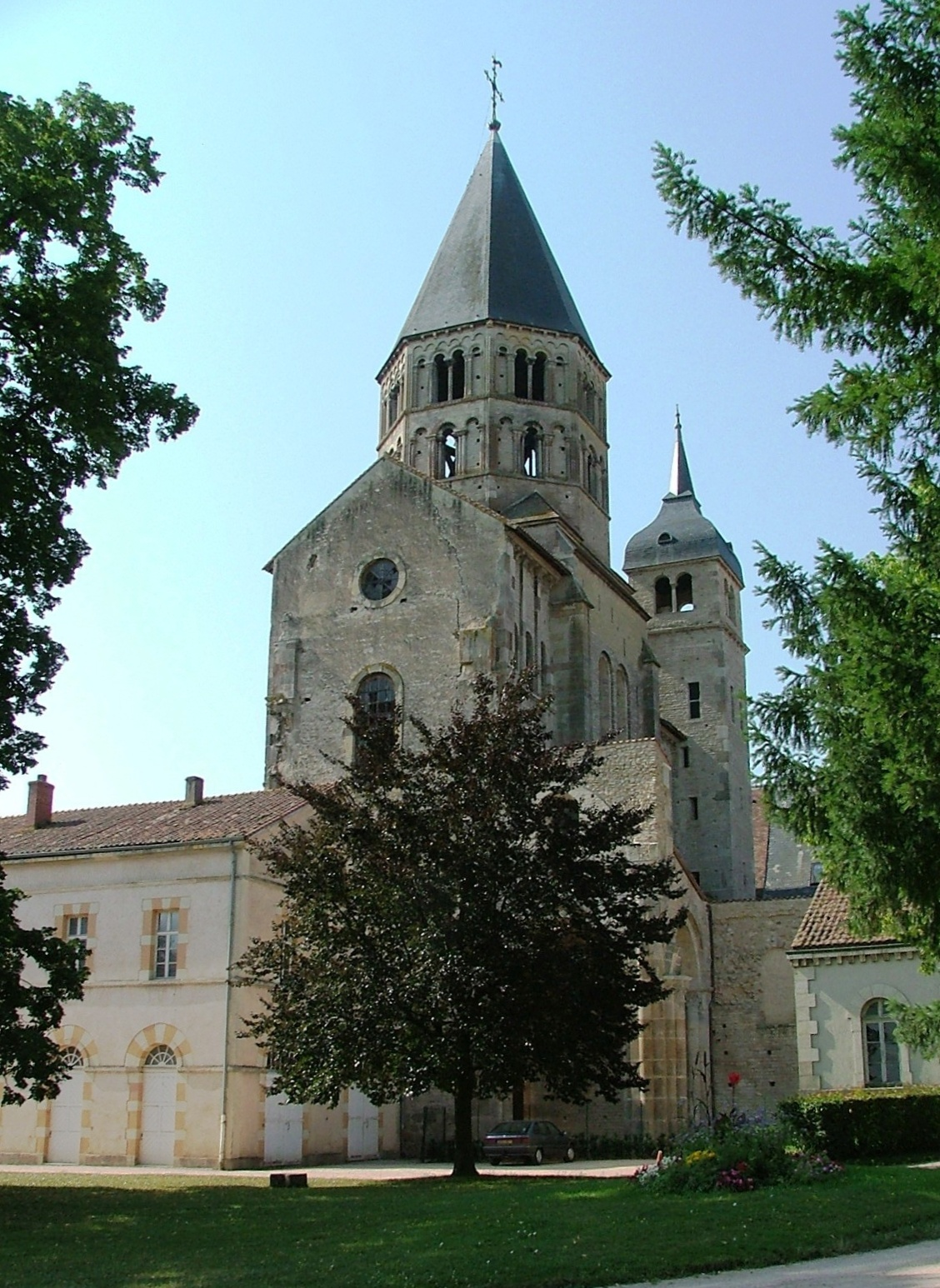
A view of the remains of the Abbey of Cluny, a Benedictine monastery that was the centre of monastic life revival in the Middle Ages and marked an important step in the cultural rebirth following the Dark Ages

Capet's son Robert the Pious was crowned king before Capet's demise. Capet decided so in order to have his succession secured. Robert met Emperor Henry II in 1023 on the borderline. They agreed to end all claims over each other's realm, setting a new stage of Capetian and Ottonian relationships. The reign of Robert was involved the Peace and Truce of God (beginning in 989) and the Cluniac Reforms.

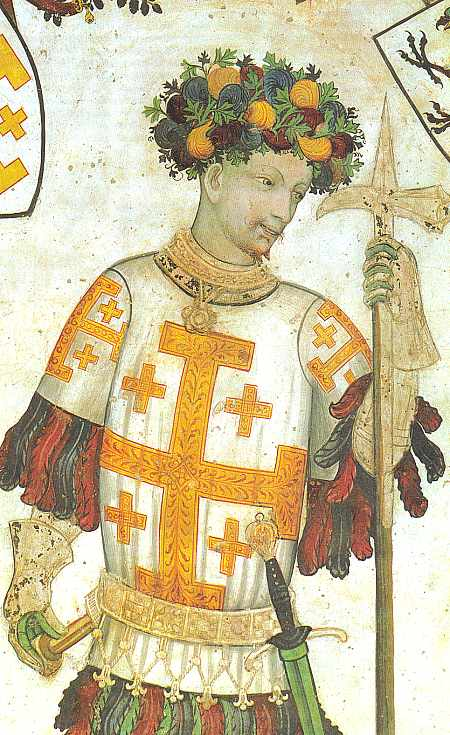
Godefroy de Bouillon, a French knight, leader of the First Crusade and founder of the Kingdom of Jerusalem

Under King Philip I, the kingdom enjoyed a modest recovery during his extraordinarily long reign (1060–1108). His reign also saw the launch of the First Crusade to regain the Holy Land. It is from Louis VI (reigned 1108–37) onward that royal authority became more accepted. Louis was more a soldier and warmongering king than a scholar. The way the king raised money from his vassals made him quite unpopular; he was described as greedy and ambitious. His regular attacks on his vassals, although damaging the royal image, reinforced the royal power. From 1127 onward Louis had the assistance of a skilled religious statesman, Abbot Suger. Louis VI successfully defeated, both military and politically, many of the robber barons. When Louis VI died in 1137, much progress had been made towards strengthening Capetian authority.

Thanks to Abbot Suger's political advice, King Louis VII (junior king 1131–37, senior king 1137–80) enjoyed greater moral authority over France than his predecessors. Powerful vassals paid homage to the French king. Abbot Suger arranged the 1137 marriage between Louis VII and Eleanor of Aquitaine in Bordeaux, which made Louis VII Duke of Aquitaine and gave him considerable power. The marriage was ultimately annulled and Eleanor soon married the Duke of Normandy — Henry Fitzempress, who would become King of England two years later.

=== Late Capetians (1165–1328) ===
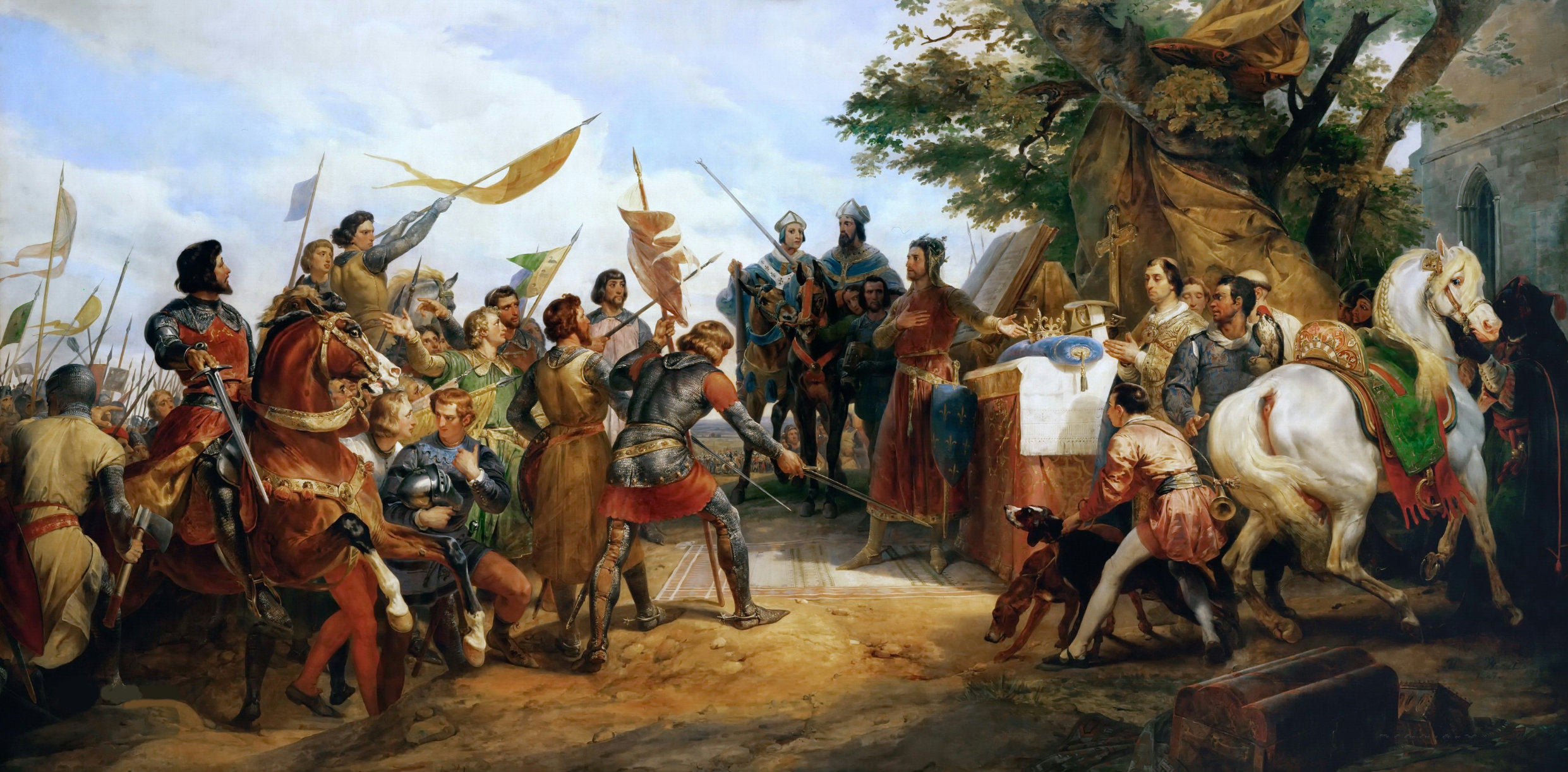
Philip II victorious at Bouvines, thus annexing Normandy and Anjou into his royal domains. This battle involved a complex set of alliances from three important states, the Kingdoms of France and England and the Holy Roman Empire.

The late direct Capetian kings were considerably more powerful and influential than the earliest ones. This period also saw the rise of a complex system of international alliances and conflicts opposing, through dynasties, kings of France and England and the Holy Roman Emperor. The reign of Philip II Augustus (junior king 1179–80, senior king 1180–1223) saw the French royal domain and influence greatly expanded. He paved the way for more powerful monarchs like Saint Louis and Philip the Fair. Philip II spent an important part of his reign fighting the so-called Angevin Empire.

During the first part of his reign Philip II allied himself with the Duke of Aquitaine and son of Henry II and Eleanor of Aquitaine — Richard Lionheart — and together they launched a decisive attack on Henry's home of Chinon and removed him from power. Richard replaced his father as King of England afterward. The two kings then went crusading during the Third Crusade; however, their alliance and friendship broke down during the crusade. John Lackland, Richard's successor, refused to come to the French court for a trial against the Lusignans and, as Louis VI had done often to his rebellious vassals, Philip II confiscated John's possessions in France. John's defeat was swift and his attempts to reconquer his French possession at the decisive Battle of Bouvines (1214) resulted in complete failure. Philip II had annexed Normandy and Anjou, plus capturing the Counts of Boulogne and Flanders, although Aquitaine and Gascony remained loyal to the Plantagenet King.

Prince Louis (the future Louis VIII, reigned 1223–26) was involved in the subsequent English civil war as French and English (or rather Anglo-Norman) aristocracies were once one and were now split between allegiances. While the French kings were struggling against the Plantagenets, the Church called for the Albigensian Crusade. Southern France was then largely absorbed in the royal domains.

France became a truly centralised kingdom under Louis IX (reigned 1226–70). The kingdom was vulnerable: war was still going on in the County of Toulouse, and the royal army was occupied fighting resistance in Languedoc. Count Raymond VII of Toulouse finally signed the Treaty of Paris in 1229, in which he retained much of his lands for life, but his daughter, married to Count Alfonso of Poitou, produced him no heir and so the County of Toulouse went to the King of France. King Henry III of England had not yet recognized the Capetian overlordship over Aquitaine and still hoped to recover Normandy and Anjou and reform the Angevin Empire. He landed in 1230 at Saint-Malo with a massive force. This evolved into the Saintonge War (1242). Ultimately, Henry III was defeated and had to recognise Louis IX's overlordship, although the King of France did not seize Aquitaine. Louis IX was now the most important landowner of France. There were some opposition to his rule in Normandy, yet it proved remarkably easy to rule, especially compared to the County of Toulouse which had been brutally conquered. The Conseil du Roi, which would evolve into the Parlement, was founded in these times. After his conflict with King Henry III of England, Louis established a cordial relation with the Plantagenet King.

The Kingdom was involved in two crusades under Louis: the Seventh Crusade and the Eighth Crusade. Both proved to be complete failures for the French King. Philip III became king when Saint Louis died in 1270 during the Eighth Crusade. Philip III was called "the Bold" on the basis of his abilities in combat and on horseback, and not because of his character or ruling abilities. Philip III took part in another crusading disaster: the Aragonese Crusade, which cost him his life in 1285. More administrative reforms were made by Philip IV, also called Philip the Fair (reigned 1285–1314). This king was responsible for the end of the Knights Templar, signed the Auld Alliance, and established the Parlement of Paris. Philip IV was so powerful that he could name popes and emperors, unlike the early Capetians. The papacy was moved to Avignon and all the contemporary popes were French, such as Philip IV's puppet Bertrand de Goth, Pope Clement V.

=== Early Valois Kings and the Hundred Years' War (1328–1453) ===
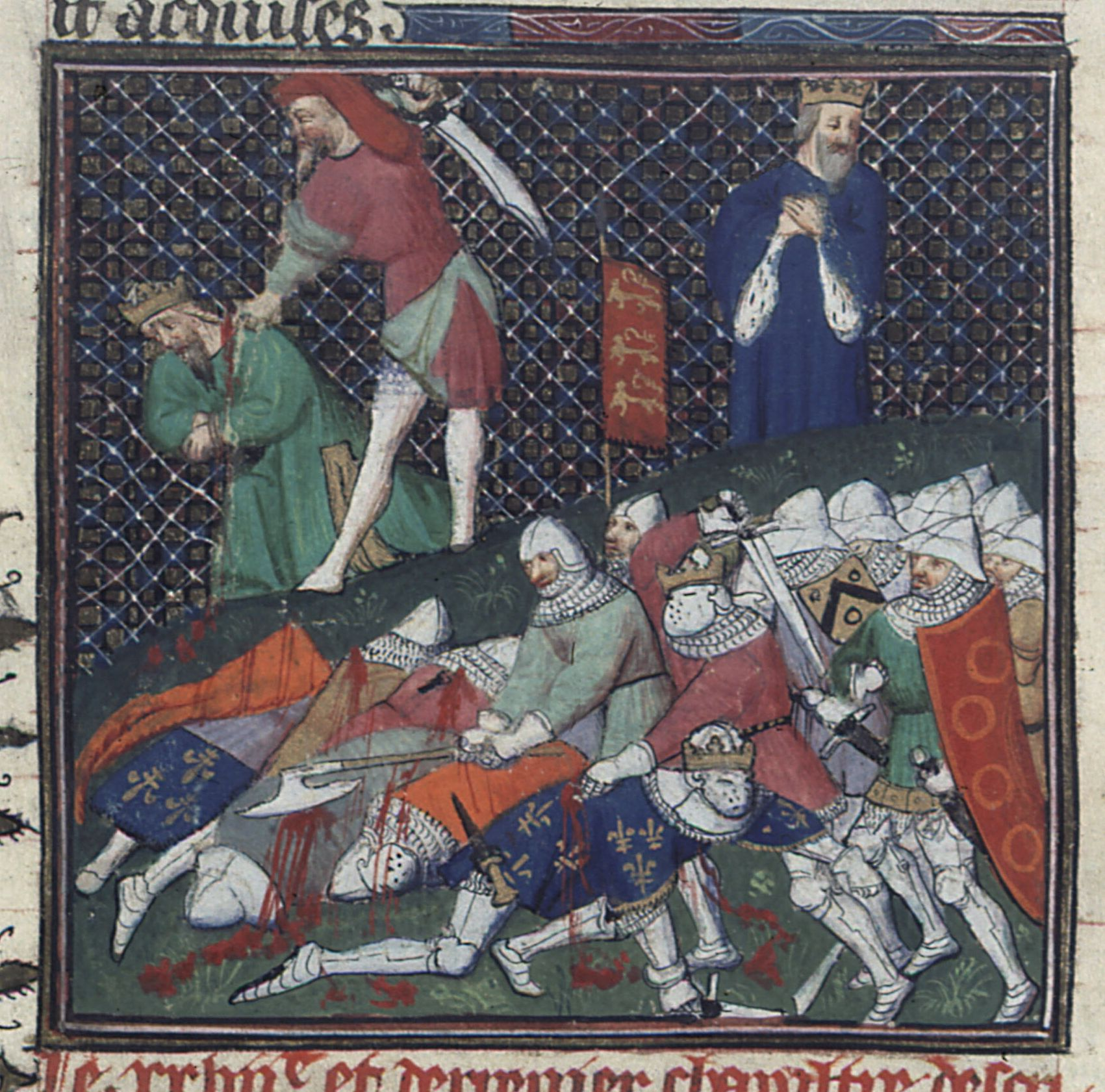
The capture of the French king John II at Poitiers in 1356

The tensions between the Houses of Plantagenet and Capet climaxed during the so-called Hundred Years' War (actually several distinct wars over the period 1337 to 1453) when the Plantagenets claimed the throne of France from the Valois. This was also the time of the Black Death in France, as well as several devastating civil wars. In 1420, by the Treaty of Troyes Henry V was made heir to Charles VI. Henry V failed to outlive Charles so it was Henry VI of England and France who consolidated the Dual-Monarchy of England and France.

It has been argued that the difficult conditions the French population suffered during the Hundred Years' War awakened French nationalism, a nationalism represented by Joan of Arc (1412–1431). Although this is debatable, the Hundred Years' War is remembered more as a Franco-English war than as a succession of feudal struggles. During this war, France evolved politically and militarily.

Although a Franco-Scottish army was successful at the Battle of Baugé (1421), the humiliating defeats of Poitiers (1356) and Agincourt (1415) forced the French nobility to realise they could not stand just as armoured knights without an organised army. Charles VII (reigned 1422–1461) established the first French standing army, the compagnies d'ordonnance, and defeated the Plantagenets once at Patay (1429) and again, using cannons, at Formigny (1450). The Battle of Castillon (1453) was the last engagement of this war; Calais and the Channel Islands remained ruled by the Plantagenets.

== Early Modern France (1453–1789) ==
France in the late 15th century: a mosaic of feudal territories

=== Ancien Regime ===
France's population was 13 million people in 1484 and 20 million in 1700. It had the second largest population in Europe around 1700. France's lead slowly faded after 1700, as other countries grew faster.

Political power was widely dispersed. The law courts ("Parlements") were powerful. However, the king had only about 10,000 officials in royal service – very few indeed for such a large country, and with very slow internal communications over an inadequate road system. Travel was usually faster by ocean ship or river boat. The different estates of the realm — the clergy, the nobility, and commoners — occasionally met together in the "Estates General", but in practice the Estates General had no power, for it could petition the king but could not pass laws.

The Catholic Church controlled about 40% of the wealth. The king (not the pope) nominated bishops, but typically had to negotiate with noble families that had close ties to local monasteries and church establishments. The nobility came second in terms of wealth, but there was no unity. Each noble had his own lands, his own network of regional connections, and his own military force.

The cities had a quasi-independent status, and were largely controlled by the leading merchants and guilds. Peasants made up the vast majority of the population, who in many cases had well-established rights that the authorities had to respect. In the 17th century peasants had ties to the market economy, provided much of the capital investment necessary for agricultural growth, and frequently moved from village to village (or town). Although most peasants in France spoke local dialects, an official language emerged in Paris and the French language became the preferred language of Europe's aristocracy and the lingua franca of diplomacy and international relations. Holy Roman Emperor Charles V quipped, "I speak Spanish to God, Italian to women, French to men, and German to my horse."

=== Consolidation (15th and 16th centuries) ===
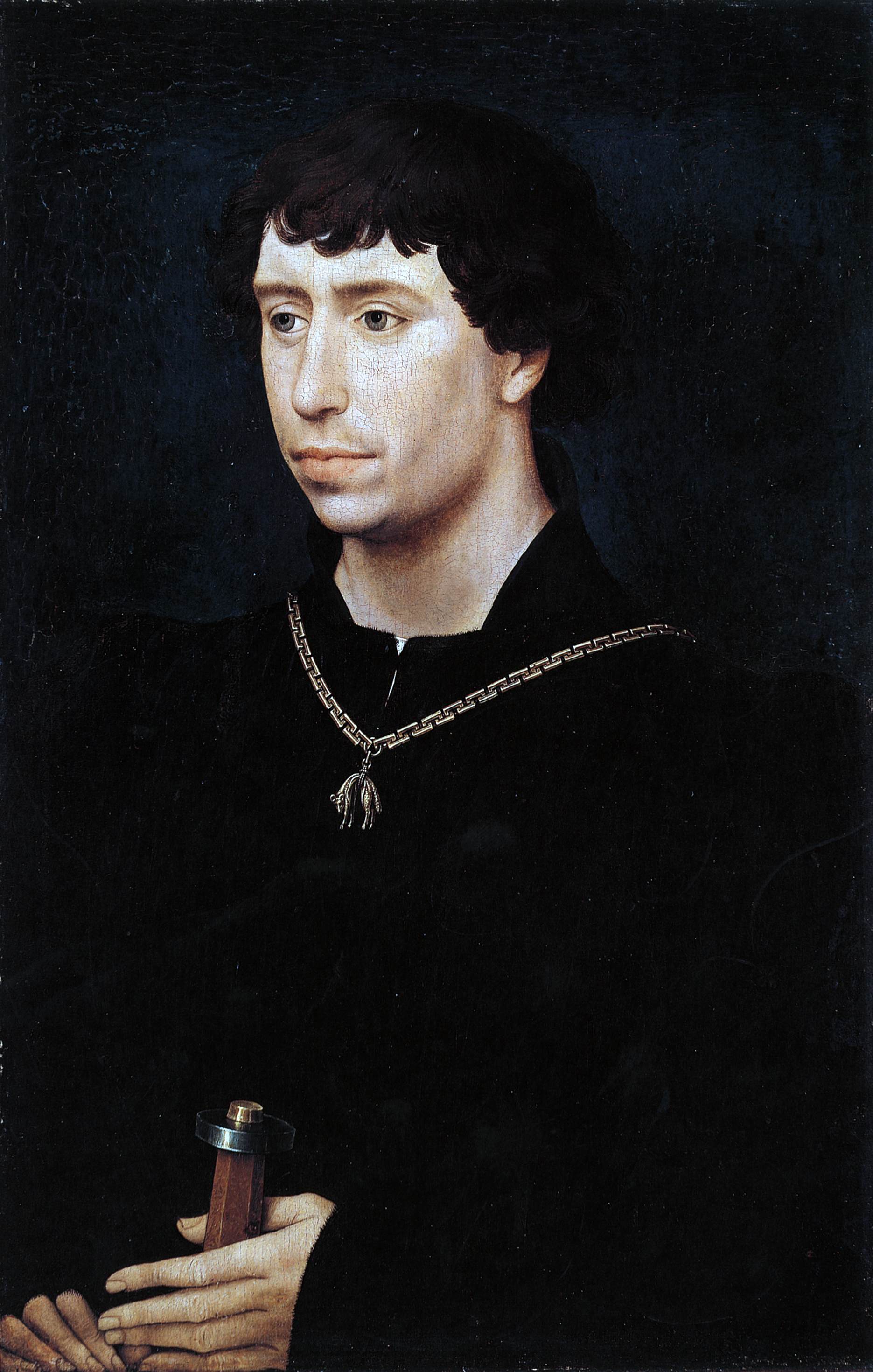
Charles the Bold, the last Valois Duke of Burgundy. His death at the Battle of Nancy (1477) marked the division of his lands between the kings of France and Habsburg dynasty.

With the death in 1477 of Charles the Bold, France and the Habsburgs began a long process of dividing his rich Burgundian lands, leading to numerous wars. In 1532, Brittany was incorporated into the Kingdom of France.

France engaged in the long Italian Wars (1494–1559), which marked the beginning of early modern France. Francis I faced powerful foes, and he was captured at Pavia. The French monarchy then sought for allies and found one in the Ottoman Empire. The Ottoman Admiral Barbarossa captured Nice in 1543 and handed it down to Francis I.

During the 16th century, the Spanish and Austrian Habsburgs were the dominant power in Europe. The many domains of Charles V encircled France. The Spanish Tercio was used with great success against French knights. Finally, on 7 January 1558, the Duke of Guise seized Calais from the English.

Economic historians call the era from about 1475 to 1630 the "beautiful 16th century" because of the return of peace, prosperity and optimism across the nation, and the steady growth of population. In 1559, Henry II of France signed (with the approval of Ferdinand I, Holy Roman Emperor) two treaties (Peace of Cateau-Cambrésis): one with Elizabeth I of England and one with Philip II of Spain. This ended long-lasting conflicts between France, England and Spain.

=== Protestant Huguenots and wars of religion (1562–1629) ===
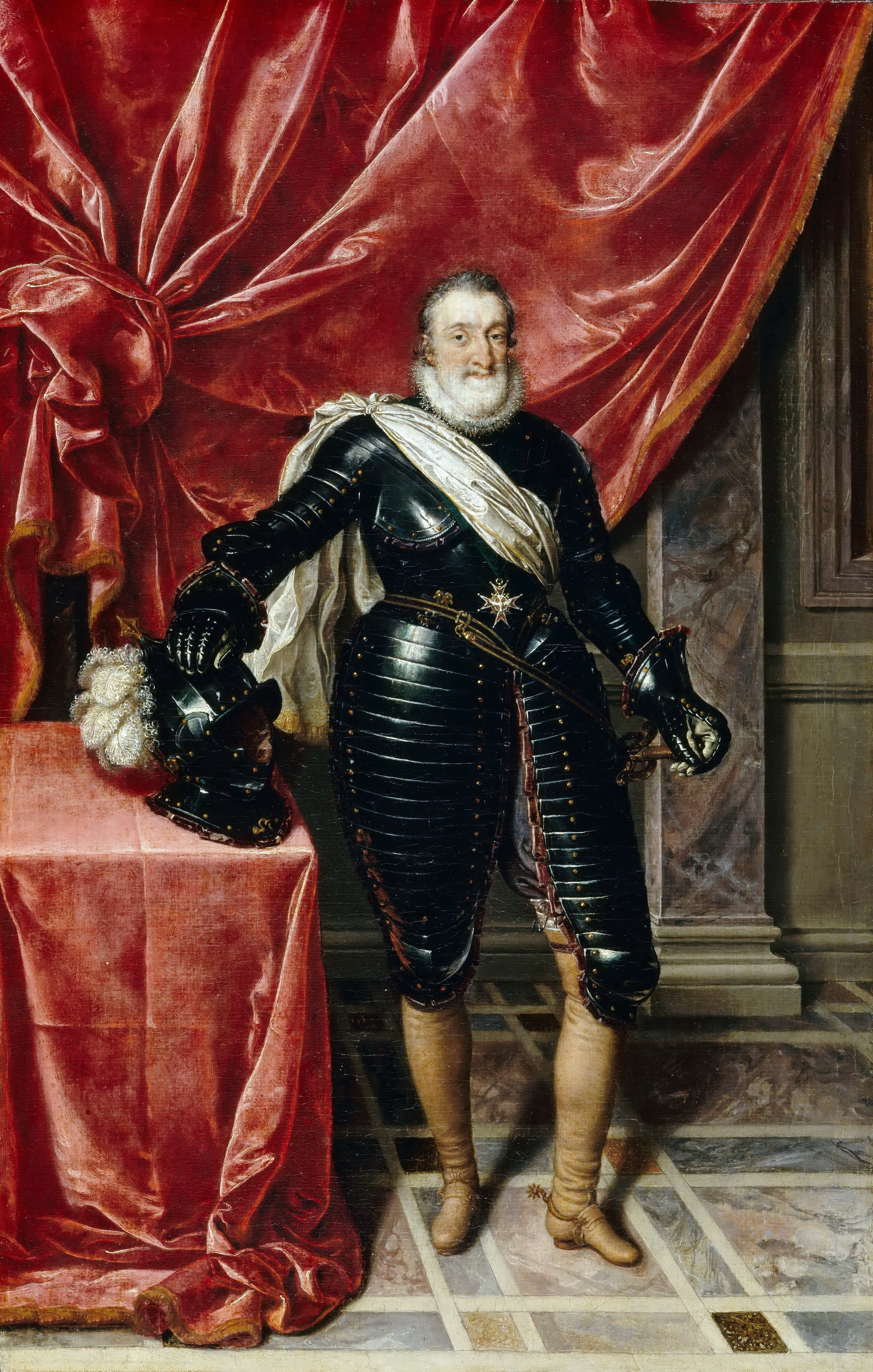
Henry IV of France was the first French Bourbon king.

The Protestant Reformation, inspired in France mainly by John Calvin, began to challenge the legitimacy and rituals of the Catholic Church. French King Henry II severely persecuted Protestants under the Edict of Chateaubriand (1551). Renewed Catholic reaction — headed by the powerful Francis, Duke of Guise — led to a massacre of Huguenots at Vassy in 1562, starting the first of the French Wars of Religion, during which English, German, and Spanish forces intervened on the side of rival Protestant ("Huguenot") and Catholic forces.

King Henry II died in 1559 in a jousting tournament; he was succeeded in turn by his three sons, each of whom assumed the throne as minors or were weak, ineffectual rulers. Into the power vacuum entered Henry's widow, Catherine de' Medici, who became a central figure in the early years of the Wars of Religion. She is often blamed for the St. Bartholomew's Day massacre of 1572, when thousands of Huguenots were murdered in Paris and the provinces of France.

The Wars of Religion culminated in the War of the Three Henrys (1584–89), at the height of which bodyguards of the King Henry III assassinated Henry de Guise, leader of the Spanish-backed Catholic league, in December 1588. In revenge, a priest assassinated Henry III in 1589. This led to the ascension of the Huguenot Henry IV; in order to bring peace to a country beset by religious and succession wars, he converted to Catholicism. He issued the Edict of Nantes in 1598, which guaranteed religious liberties to the Protestants, thereby effectively ending the civil war. Henry IV was assassinated in 1610 by a fanatical Catholic.

When in 1620 the Huguenots proclaimed a constitution for the 'Republic of the Reformed Churches of France', the chief minister Cardinal Richelieu invoked the entire powers of the state to stop it. Religious conflicts therefore resumed under Louis XIII when Richelieu forced Protestants to disarm their army and fortresses. This conflict ended in the Siege of La Rochelle (1627–28), in which Protestants and their English supporters were defeated. The following Peace of Alais (1629) confirmed religious freedom yet dismantled the Protestant military defences.

In the face of persecution, Huguenots dispersed widely throughout Europe and America.

=== Thirty Years' War (1618–1648) ===
The religious conflicts that plagued France also ravaged the Habsburg-led Holy Roman Empire. The Thirty Years' War eroded the power of the Catholic Habsburgs. Although Cardinal Richelieu, the powerful chief minister of France, had mauled the Protestants, he joined this war on their side in 1636 because it was in the national interest. Imperial Habsburg forces invaded France, ravaged Champagne, and nearly threatened Paris.

Richelieu died in 1642 and was succeeded by Cardinal Mazarin, while Louis XIII died one year later and was succeeded by Louis XIV. France was served by some very efficient commanders such as Louis II de Bourbon, Prince de Condé and Henri de la Tour d'Auvergne, Vicomte de Turenne. The French forces won a decisive victory at Rocroi (1643), and the Spanish army was decimated; the Tercio was broken. The Truce of Ulm (1647) and the Peace of Westphalia (1648) brought an end to the war.

France was hit by civil unrest known as The Fronde which in turn evolved into the Franco-Spanish War in 1653. Louis II de Bourbon joined the Spanish army this time, but suffered a severe defeat at Dunkirk (1658) by Henry de la Tour d'Auvergne. The terms for the peace inflicted upon the Spanish kingdoms in the Treaty of the Pyrenees (1659) were harsh, as France annexed Northern Catalonia.

=== Colonies (16th and 17th centuries) ===
During the 16th century, the king began to claim North American territories and established several colonies. Jacques Cartier was one of the great explorers who ventured deep into American territories during the 16th century.

The early 17th century saw the first successful French settlements in the New World with the voyages of Samuel de Champlain in 1608. The largest settlement was New France. In 1699, French territorial claims in North America expanded still further, with the foundation of Louisiana.

The French presence in Africa began in Senegal in 1626, although formal colonies and trading posts were not established until 1659 with the founding of Saint-Louis. The first French settlement of Madagascar began in 1642 with the establishment of Fort Dauphin.

=== Louis XIV (1643–1715) ===
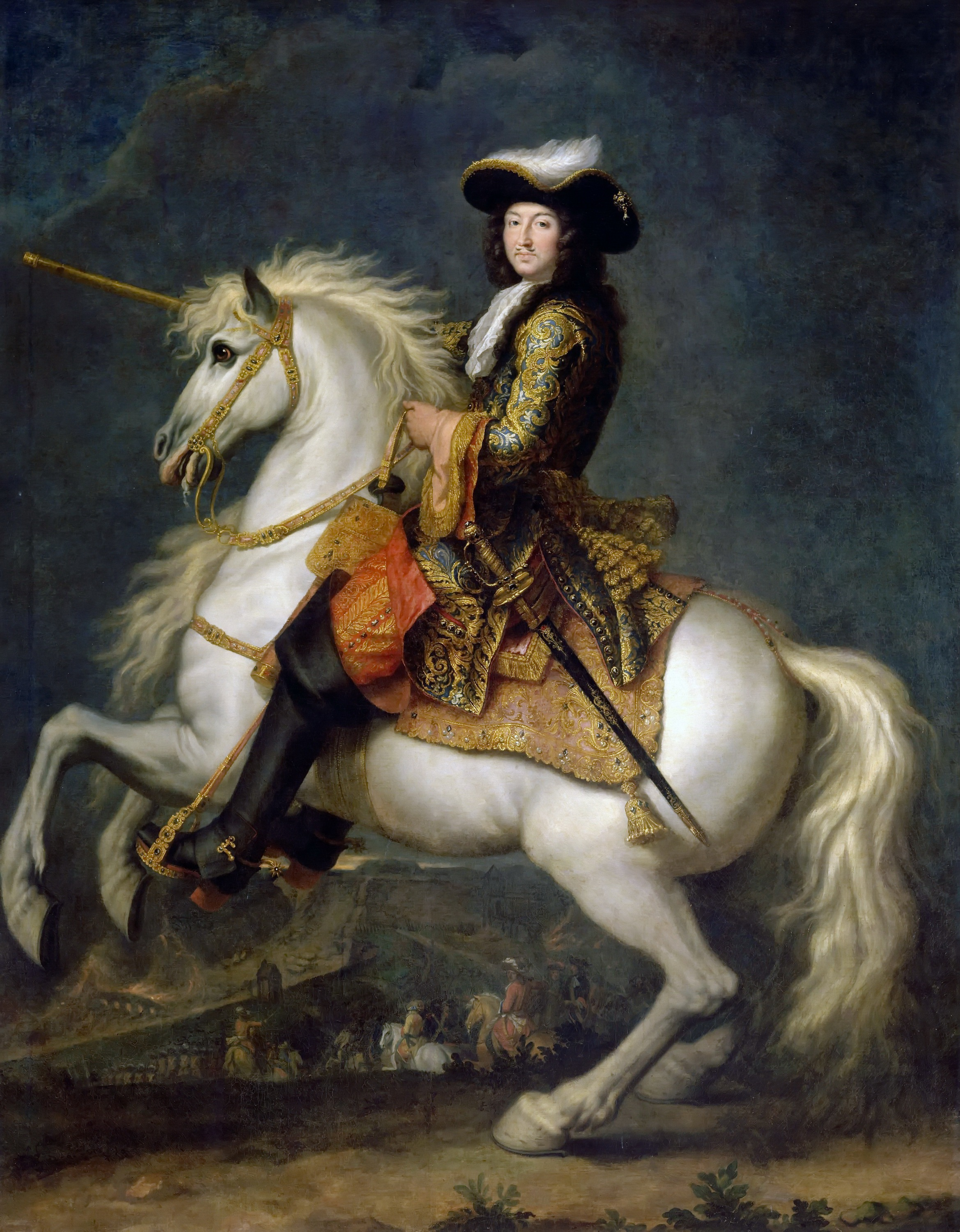
Louis XIV, the "Sun King"

Louis XIV, known as the "Sun King", reigned over France from 1643 until 1715. Louis continued his predecessors' work of creating a centralized state governed from Paris, sought to eliminate remnants of feudalism in France, and subjugated and weakened the aristocracy. By these means he consolidated a system of absolute monarchical rule in France that endured until the French Revolution. However, Louis XIV's long reign saw France involved in many wars that drained its treasury.

The French-dominated League of the Rhine fought against the Ottoman Turks at the Battle of Saint Gotthard in 1664. France fought the War of Devolution against Spain in 1667. France's defeat of Spain and invasion of the Spanish Netherlands alarmed England and Sweden. With the Dutch Republic they formed the Triple Alliance to check Louis XIV's expansion. Louis II de Bourbon had captured Franche-Comté, but in face of an indefensible position, Louis XIV agreed to the peace of Aachen. War broke out again between France and the Dutch Republic in the Franco-Dutch War (1672–78). France attacked the Dutch Republic and was joined by England in this conflict. Through targeted inundations of polders by breaking dykes, the French invasion of the Dutch Republic was brought to a halt. The Dutch Admiral Michiel de Ruyter inflicted a few strategic defeats on the Anglo-French naval alliance and forced England to retire from the war in 1674. Because the Netherlands could not resist indefinitely, it agreed to peace in the Treaties of Nijmegen, according to which France would annex France-Comté and acquire further concessions in the Spanish Netherlands. In May 1682, the royal court moved to the lavish Palace of Versailles, which Louis XIV had greatly expanded. Over time, Louis XIV compelled many members of the nobility, especially the noble elite, to inhabit Versailles. He controlled the nobility with an elaborate system of pensions and privileges, and replaced their power with himself.

Peace did not last, and war between France and Spain again resumed. The War of the Reunions broke out (1683–84), and again Spain, with its ally the Holy Roman Empire, was defeated. Meanwhile, in October 1685 Louis signed the Edict of Fontainebleau ordering the destruction of all Protestant churches and schools in France. Its immediate consequence was a large Protestant exodus from France. Over two million people died in two famines in 1693 and 1710.

France would soon be involved in another war, the War of the Grand Alliance. This time the theatre was not only in Europe but also in North America. Although the war was long and difficult (it was also called the Nine Years' War), its results were inconclusive. The Treaty of Ryswick in 1697 confirmed French sovereignty over Alsace, yet rejected its claims to Luxembourg. Louis also had to evacuate Catalonia and the Palatinate. This peace was considered a truce by all sides, thus war was to start again.

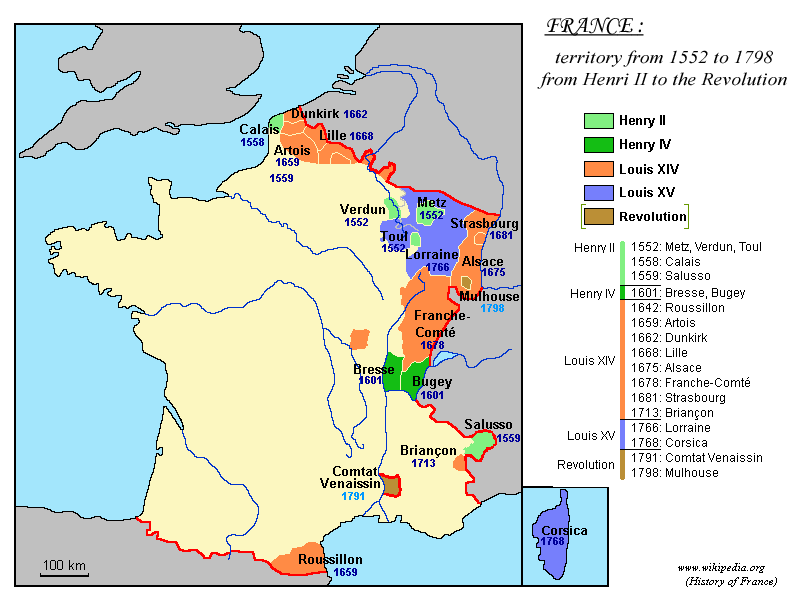
The expansion of France, 1552 to 1798

In 1701, the War of the Spanish Succession began. The Bourbon Philip of Anjou was designated heir to the throne of Spain as Philip V. The Habsburg Emperor Leopold opposed a Bourbon succession, because the power that such a succession would bring to the Bourbon rulers of France would disturb the delicate balance of power in Europe. Therefore, he claimed the Spanish thrones for himself. England and the Dutch Republic joined Leopold against Louis XIV and Philip of Anjou. They inflicted a few resounding defeats on the French army; the Battle of Blenheim in 1704 was the first major land battle lost by France since its victory at Rocroi in 1643. Yet, the extremely bloody battles of Ramillies (1706) and Malplaquet (1709) proved to be Pyrrhic victories for the allies, as they had lost too many men to continue the war. Led by Villars, French forces recovered much of the lost ground in battles such as Denain (1712). Finally, a compromise was achieved with the Treaty of Utrecht in 1713. Philip of Anjou was confirmed as Philip V, king of Spain; Emperor Leopold did not get the throne, but Philip V was barred from inheriting France.

Louis XIV wanted to be remembered as a patron of the arts, and invited Jean-Baptiste Lully to establish the French opera.

The wars were so expensive, and so inconclusive, that although France gained some territory to the east, its enemies gained more strength than it did. Vauban, France's leading military strategist, warned the King in 1689 that a hostile "Alliance" was too powerful at sea. He recommended the best way for France to fight back was to license French merchants ships to privateer and seize enemy merchant ships, while avoiding its navies. Vauban was pessimistic about France's so-called friends and allies and recommended against expensive land wars, or hopeless naval wars.

=== Major changes in France, Europe, and North America (1718–1783) ===
Louis XIV died in 1715 and was succeeded by his five-year-old great-grandson who reigned as Louis XV until his death in 1774. In 1718, France was once again at war, as Philip II of Orléans' regency joined the War of the Quadruple Alliance against Spain. In 1733 another war broke in central Europe, this time about the Polish succession, and France joined the war against the Austrian Empire. Peace was settled in the Treaty of Vienna (1738), according to which France would annex, through inheritance, the Duchy of Lorraine.

Two years later, in 1740, war broke out over the Austrian succession, and France seized the opportunity to join the conflict. The war played out in North America and India as well as Europe, and inconclusive terms were agreed to in the Treaty of Aix-la-Chapelle (1748). Prussia was then becoming a new threat, as it had gained substantial territory from Austria. This led to the Diplomatic Revolution of 1756, in which the alliances seen during the previous war were mostly inverted. France was now allied to Austria and Russia, while Britain was now allied to Prussia.

In the North American theatre, France was allied with various Native American peoples during the Seven Years' War and, despite a temporary success at the battles of the Great Meadows and Monongahela, French forces were defeated at the disastrous Battle of the Plains of Abraham in Quebec. In 1762, Russia, France, and Austria were on the verge of crushing Prussia, when the Anglo-Prussian Alliance was saved by the Miracle of the House of Brandenburg. At sea, naval defeats against British fleets at Lagos and Quiberon Bay in 1759 and a crippling blockade forced France to keep its ships in port. Finally peace was concluded in the Treaty of Paris (1763), and France lost its North American empire.

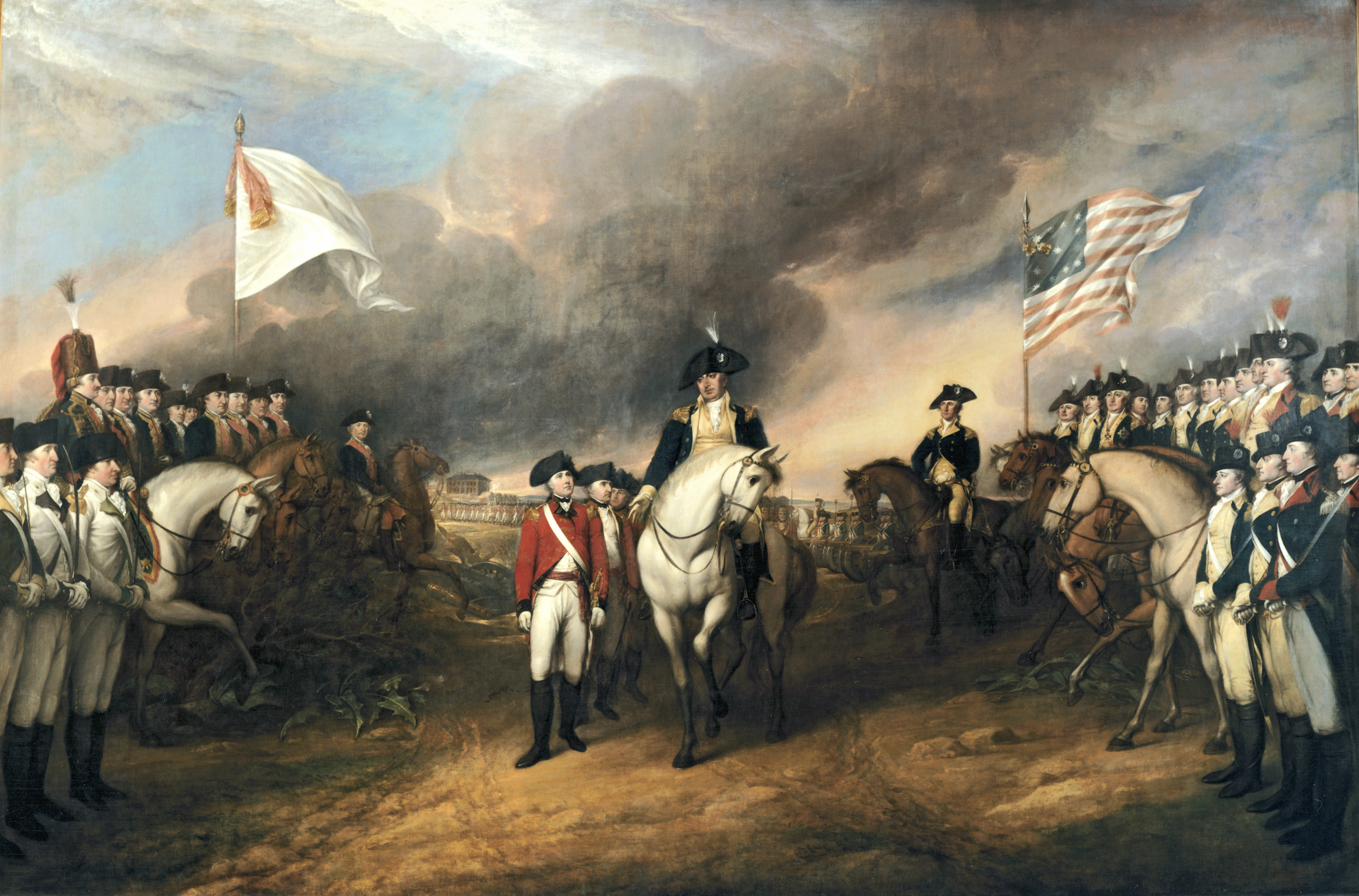
Lord Cornwallis surrenders at Yorktown to American and French allies.

Britain's success in the Seven Years' War had allowed them to eclipse France as the leading colonial power. France sought revenge for this defeat, and under Choiseul France started to rebuild. In 1766, the French Kingdom annexed Lorraine and the following year bought Corsica from Genoa. Having lost its colonial empire, France saw a good opportunity for revenge against Britain in signing an alliance with the Americans in 1778, and sending an army and navy that turned the American Revolution into a world war. Admiral de Grasse defeated a British fleet at Chesapeake Bay while Jean-Baptiste Donatien de Vimeur, comte de Rochambeau and Gilbert du Motier, Marquis de Lafayette joined American forces in defeating the British at Yorktown. The war was concluded by the Treaty of Paris (1783); the United States became independent. The British Royal Navy scored a major victory over France in 1782 at the Battle of the Saintes and France finished the war with huge debts and the minor gain of the island of Tobago.

=== French Enlightenment ===
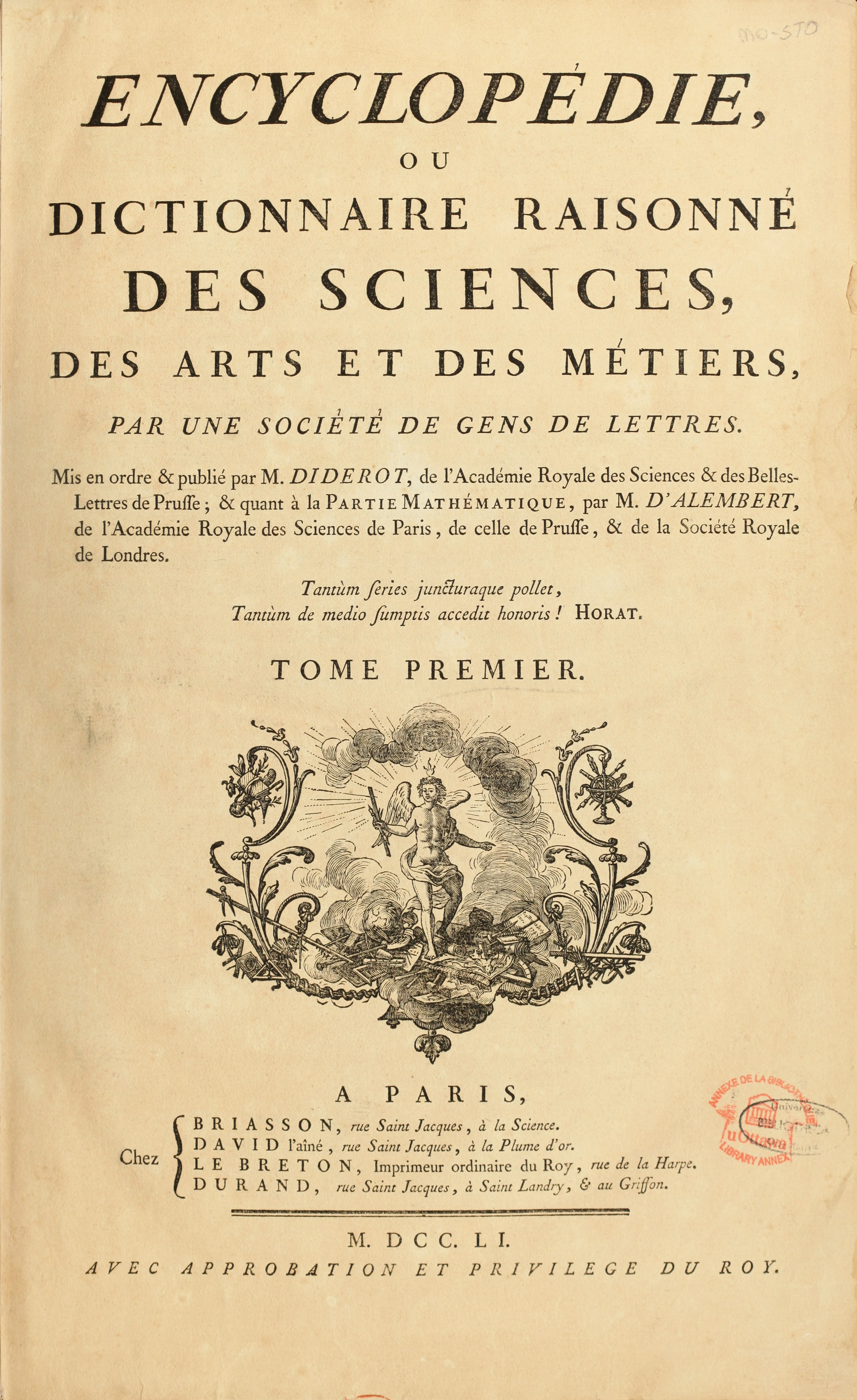
Cover of the Encyclopédie

The "Philosophes" were 18th-century French intellectuals who dominated the French Enlightenment and were influential across Europe. The philosopher Denis Diderot was editor-in-chief of the famous Enlightenment accomplishment, the 72,000-article Encyclopédie (1751–72). It sparked a revolution in learning throughout the enlightened world.

In the early part of the 18th century the movement was dominated by Voltaire and Montesquieu. Around 1750 the Philosophes reached their most influential period, as Montesquieu published Spirit of Laws (1748) and Jean-Jacques Rousseau published Discourse on the Moral Effects of the Arts and Sciences (1750). The leader of the French Enlightenment and a writer of enormous influence across Europe, was Voltaire.

Astronomy, chemistry, mathematics and technology flourished. French chemists such as Antoine Lavoisier worked to replace the archaic units of weights and measures by a coherent scientific system. Lavoisier also formulated the law of Conservation of mass and discovered oxygen and hydrogen.

== Revolutionary France (1789–1799) ==
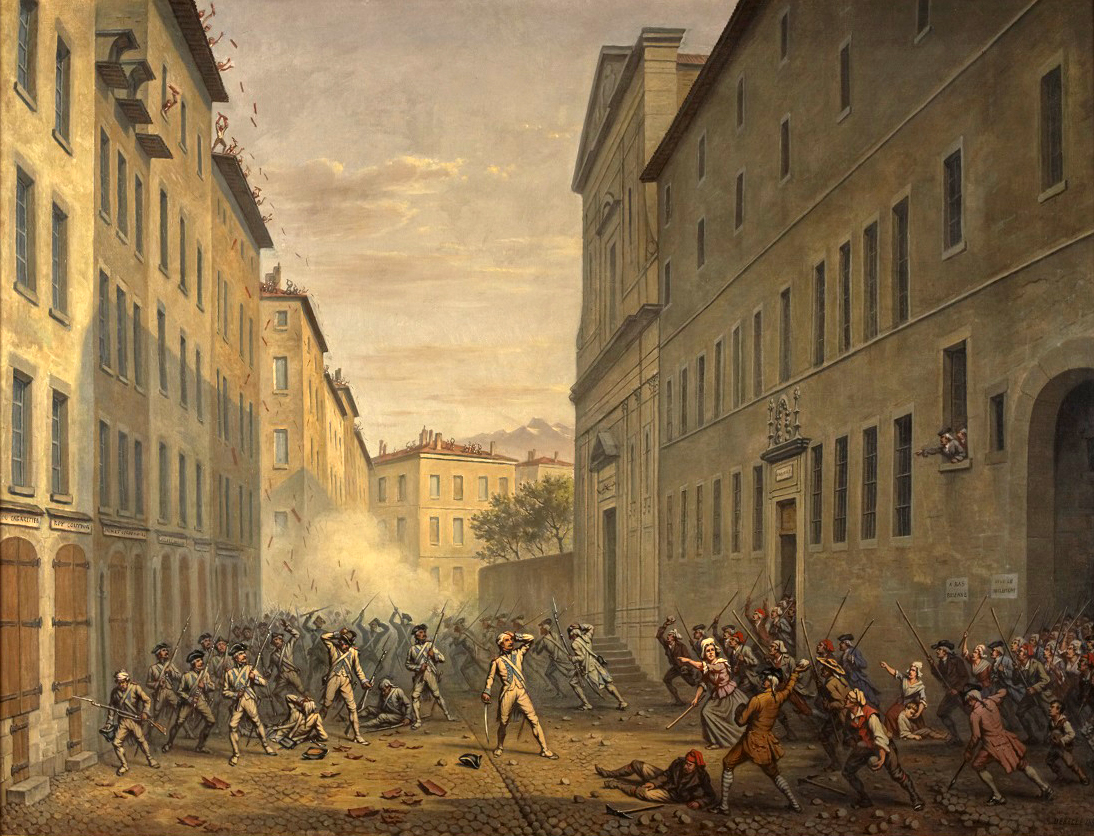
Day of the Tiles in 1788 at Grenoble was the first riot. (Musée de la Révolution française).

The French Revolution was a period of political and societal change in France that began with the Estates General of 1789, and ended with the coup of 18 Brumaire in November 1799 and the formation of the French Consulate. Many of its ideas are considered fundamental principles of liberal democracy, while its values and institutions remain central to modern French political discourse.

Its causes are generally agreed to be a combination of social, political and economic factors, which the Ancien Régime proved unable to manage. A financial crisis and widespread social distress led in May 1789 to the convocation of the Estates General, which was converted into a National Assembly in June. The Storming of the Bastille on 14 July led to a series of radical measures by the Assembly, among them the abolition of feudalism, state control over the Catholic Church in France, and a declaration of rights.

The next three years were dominated by the struggle for political control, exacerbated by economic depression. Military defeats following the outbreak of the French Revolutionary Wars in April 1792 resulted in the insurrection of 10 August 1792. The monarchy was abolished and replaced by the French First Republic in September, while Louis XVI was executed in January 1793.

After another revolt in June 1793, the constitution was suspended and effective political power passed from the National Convention to the Committee of Public Safety. About 16,000 people were executed in a Reign of Terror, which ended in July 1794. Weakened by external threats and internal opposition, the Republic was replaced in 1795 by the Directory. Four years later in 1799, the Consulate seized power in a military coup led by Napoleon Bonaparte. This is generally seen as marking the end of the Revolutionary period.

== Napoleonic France (1799–1815) ==
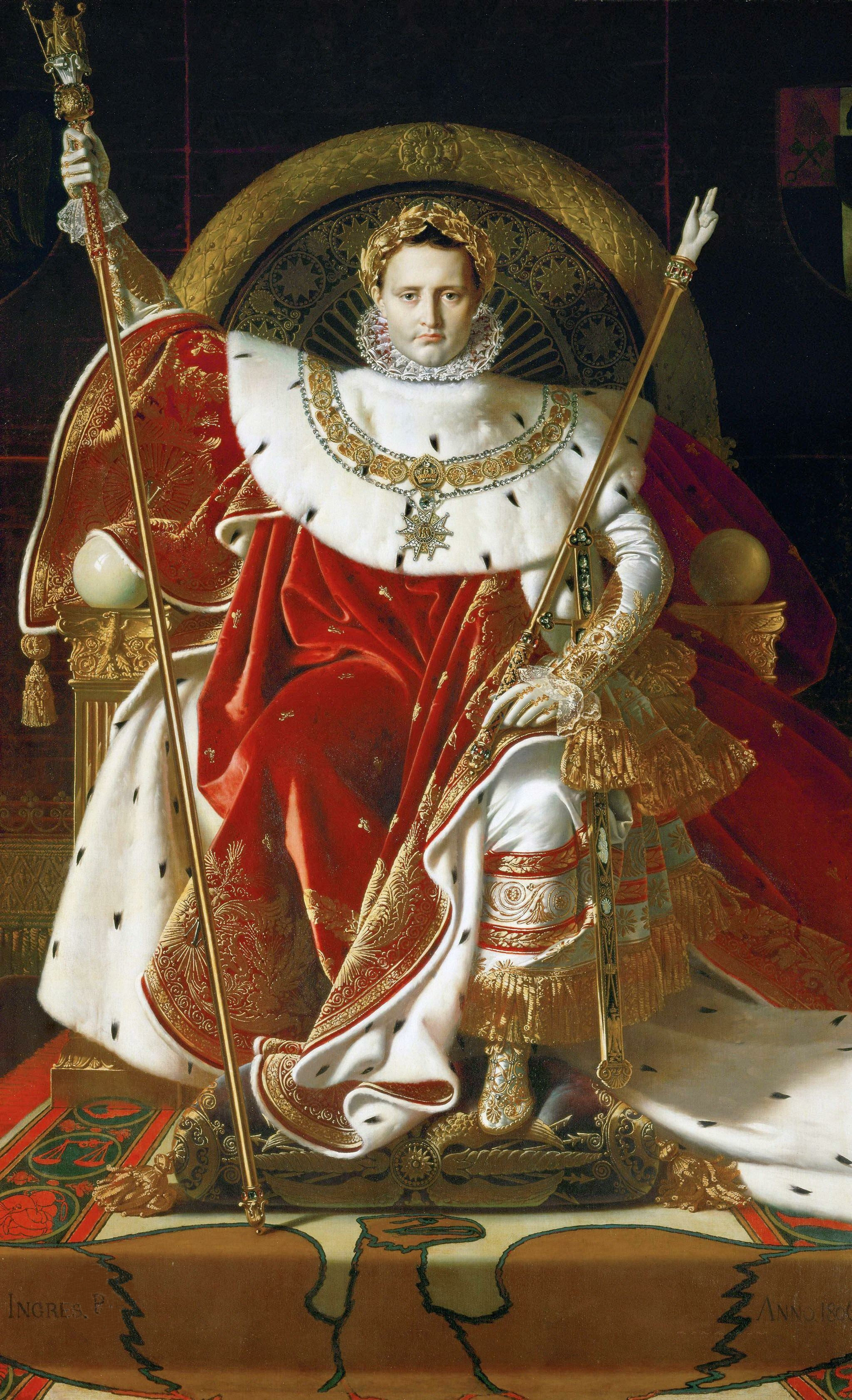
Napoleon I on His Imperial Throne, by Jean Auguste Dominique Ingres

During the War of the First Coalition (1792–1797), the Directory had replaced the National Convention. Five directors then ruled France. As Great Britain was still at war with France, a plan was made to take Egypt from the Ottoman Empire, a British ally. This was Napoleon's idea and the Directory agreed to the plan in order to send the popular general away from the mainland. Napoleon defeated the Ottoman forces during the Battle of the Pyramids (1798). Scientists and linguists thoroughly explored Egypt. Weeks later, the British fleet under Admiral Horatio Nelson unexpectedly destroyed the French fleet at the Battle of the Nile. Napoleon planned to move into Syria, but was defeated at the Siege of Acre. He returned to France without his army, which surrendered.

The Directory was threatened by the Second Coalition (1798–1802). Royalists and their allies still dreamed of restoring the monarchy to power, while the Prussian and Austrian crowns did not accept their territorial losses during the previous war. In 1799, the Russian army expelled the French from Italy in battles such as Cassano, while the Austrian army defeated the French in Switzerland at Stockach and Zurich. Napoleon then seized power through a coup and established the Consulate in 1799. The Austrian army was defeated at the Battle of Marengo and the Battle of Hohenlinden in 1800.

While at sea, the French had some success at Boulogne, but Nelson's Royal Navy destroyed an anchored Danish and Norwegian fleet at the Battle of Copenhagen (1801), because the Scandinavian kingdoms opposed the British blockade of France. The Second Coalition was beaten and peace was settled in two distinct treaties: the Treaty of Lunéville and the Treaty of Amiens. A brief interlude of peace ensued in 1802–03, during which Napoleon sold French Louisiana to the United States, because it was indefensible.

In 1801, Napoleon concluded a "Concordat" with Pope Pius VII that opened peaceful relations between church and state in France. The policies of the Revolution were reversed, except the Church did not get its lands back. Bishops and clergy were to receive state salaries, and the government would pay for the building and maintenance of churches. Napoleon reorganized higher learning by dividing the Institut National into four (later five) academies.

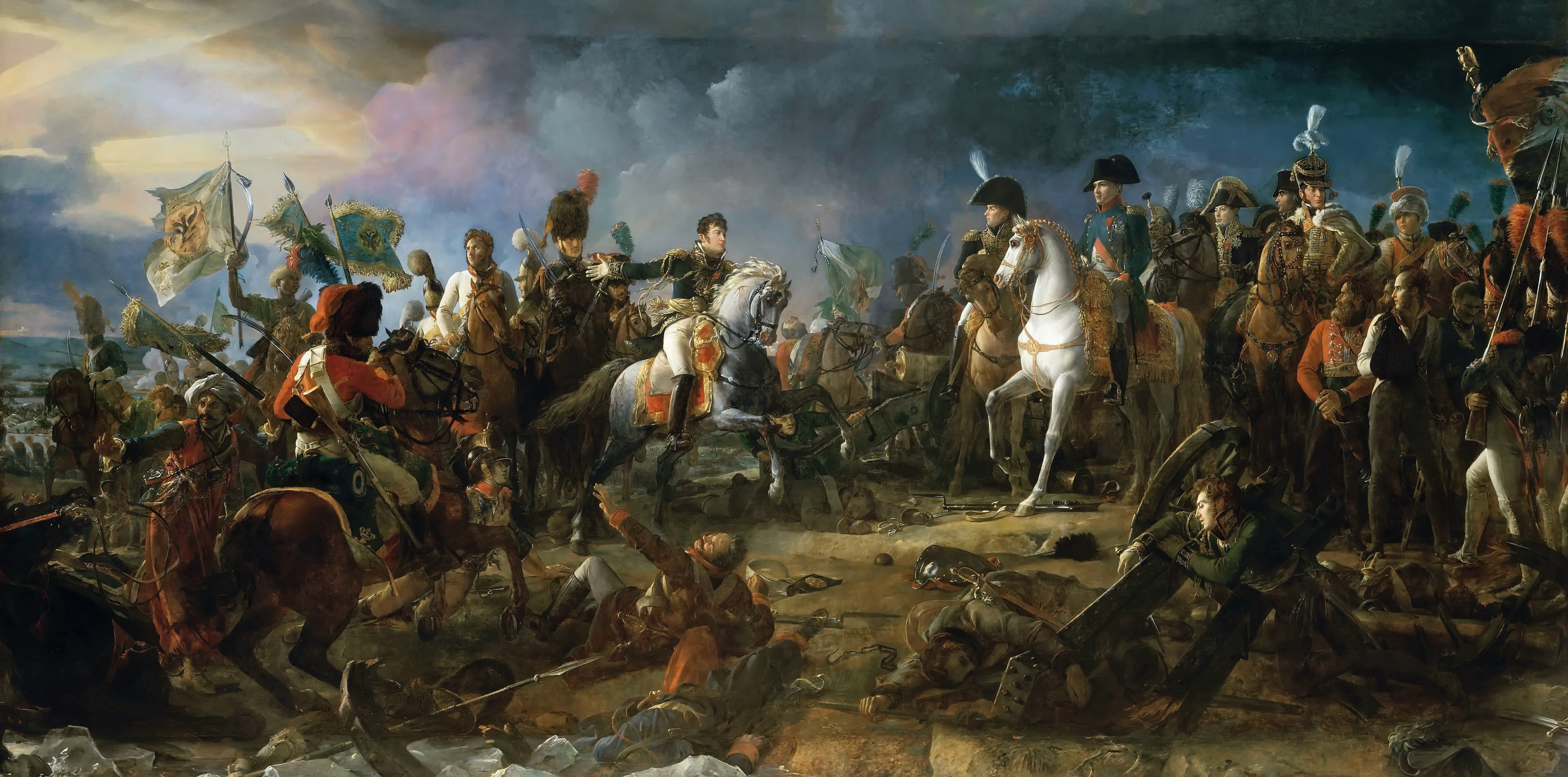
Napoléon at the Battle of Austerlitz, by François Gérard

In 1804, Napoleon was titled Emperor by the senate, thus founding the First French Empire. Napoleon's rule was constitutional, and although autocratic, it was much more advanced than traditional European monarchies of the time. The proclamation of the French Empire was met by the Third Coalition. The French army was renamed La Grande Armée in 1805 and Napoleon used propaganda and nationalism to control the French population. The French army achieved a resounding victory at Ulm, where an entire Austrian army was captured.

A Franco-Spanish fleet was defeated at Trafalgar, making plans to invade Britain impossible. Despite this defeat, Napoleon inflicted on the Austrian and Russian Empires one of their greatest defeats at Austerlitz on December 2, 1805, destroying the Third Coalition. Peace was settled in the Treaty of Pressburg; the Austrian Empire lost the title of Holy Roman Emperor and the Confederation of the Rhine was created by Napoleon over former Austrian territories.

=== Coalitions formed against Napoleon ===
Prussia joined Britain and Russia, thus forming the Fourth Coalition. Although the Coalition was joined by other allies, the French Empire was also not alone since it now had a complex network of allies and subject states. The largely outnumbered French army crushed the Prussian army at Jena-Auerstedt in 1806; Napoleon captured Berlin and went as far as Eastern Prussia. There the Russian Empire was defeated at the Battle of Friedland (14 June 1807). Peace was dictated in the Treaties of Tilsit, in which Russia had to join the Continental System, and Prussia handed half of its territories to France. The Duchy of Warsaw was formed over these territorial losses, and Polish troops entered the Grande Armée in significant numbers.

In order to ruin the British economy, Napoleon set up the Continental System in 1807, and tried to prevent merchants across Europe from trading with Britain. The large amount of smuggling frustrated Napoleon, and did more harm to his economy than to his enemies'.

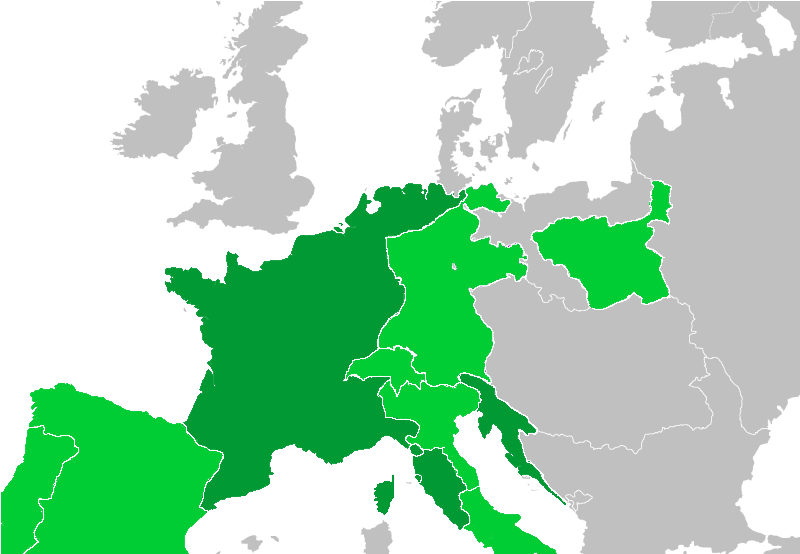
The height of the First Empire

Freed from his obligation in the east, Napoleon then went back to the west, as the French Empire was still at war with Britain. Only two countries remained neutral in the war: Sweden and Portugal, and Napoleon then looked toward the latter. In the Treaty of Fontainebleau (1807), a Franco-Spanish alliance against Portugal was sealed as Spain eyed Portuguese territories. French armies entered Spain in order to attack Portugal, but then seized Spanish fortresses and took over the kingdom by surprise. Joseph Bonaparte, Napoleon's brother, was made King of Spain after Charles IV abdicated.

This occupation of the Iberian peninsula fueled local nationalism, and soon the Spanish and Portuguese fought the French using guerilla tactics, defeating the French forces at the Battle of Bailén (June and July 1808). Britain sent a short-lived ground support force to Portugal, and French forces evacuated Portugal as defined in the Convention of Sintra following the Allied victory at Vimeiro (21 August 1808). France only controlled Catalonia and Navarre and could have been definitely expelled from the Iberian peninsula had the Spanish armies attacked again, but the Spanish did not.

Another French attack was launched on Spain, led by Napoleon himself, and was described as "an avalanche of fire and steel". However, the French Empire was no longer regarded as invincible by European powers. In 1808, Austria formed the Fifth Coalition in order to break down the French Empire. The Austrian Empire defeated the French at Aspern-Essling, yet was beaten at Wagram while the Polish allies defeated the Austrian Empire at Raszyn (April 1809). Although not as decisive as the previous Austrian defeats, the peace treaty in October 1809 stripped Austria of a large amount of territory, reducing it even more.

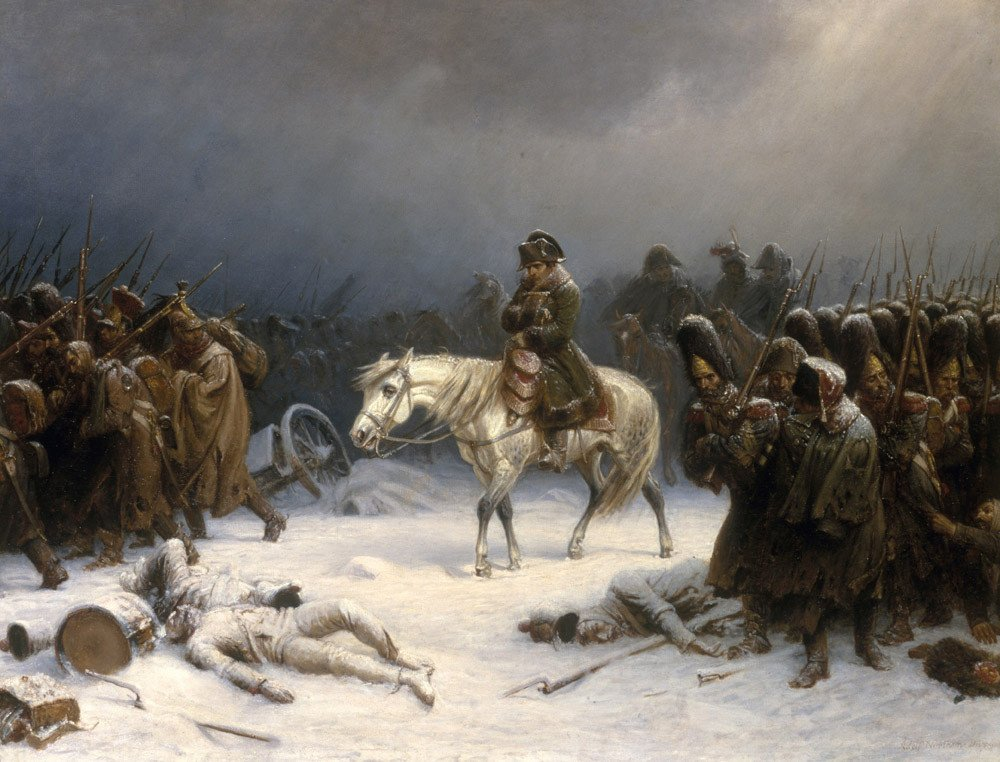
Napoleon Bonaparte retreating from Moscow, by Adolf Northern

In 1812, war broke out with Russia, engaging Napoleon in the disastrous French invasion of Russia (1812). Napoleon assembled the largest army Europe had ever seen, including troops from all subject states, to invade Russia, which had just left the continental system and was gathering an army on the Polish frontier. Following an exhausting march and the bloody but inconclusive Battle of Borodino, near Moscow, the Grande Armée entered and captured Moscow, only to find it burning as part of the Russian scorched earth tactics. Although there still were battles, the Napoleonic army left Russia in late 1812 annihilated, most of all by the Russian winter, exhaustion, and scorched earth warfare. On the Spanish front the French troops were defeated at Vitoria (June 1813) and then at the Battle of the Pyrenees (July–August 1813). Since the Spanish guerrillas seemed to be uncontrollable, the French troops eventually evacuated Spain.

Since France had been defeated on these two fronts, states that had been conquered and controlled by Napoleon saw a good opportunity to strike back. The Sixth Coalition was formed under British leadership. The German states of the Confederation of the Rhine switched sides, finally opposing Napoleon. Napoleon was largely defeated in the Battle of the Nations outside Leipzig in October 1813, his forces heavily outnumbered by the Allied coalition armies and was overwhelmed by much larger armies during the Six Days Campaign (February 1814), although, the Six Days Campaign is often considered a tactical masterpiece because the allies suffered much higher casualties. Napoleon abdicated on 6 April 1814, and was exiled to Elba.

The Congress of Vienna reversed the political changes that had occurred during the wars. Napoleon suddenly returned, seized control of France, raised an army, and marched on his enemies in the Hundred Days. It ended with his final defeat at the Battle of Waterloo in 1815, and his exile to St. Helena, a remote island in the South Atlantic Ocean.

The monarchy was subsequently restored and Louis XVIII, younger brother of Louis XVI, became king, and the exiles returned. However many of the Revolutionary and Napoleonic reforms were kept in place.

=== Napoleon's impact on France ===
Napoleon centralized power in Paris, with all the provinces governed by all-powerful prefects whom he selected. They were more powerful than royal intendants of the ancien régime and had a long-term impact in unifying the nation, minimizing regional differences, and shifting all decisions to Paris.

Religion had been a major issue during the Revolution, and Napoleon resolved most of the outstanding problems, moving the clergy and large numbers of devout Catholics from hostility to the government to support for him. The Catholic system was reestablished by the Concordat of 1801 (signed with Pope Pius VII), so that church life returned to normal; the church lands were not restored but the Jesuits were allowed back in and the bitter fights between the government and Church ended. Protestants, Jews and atheists were tolerated.

The French taxation system had collapsed in the 1780s. In the 1790s the government seized and sold church lands and lands of exiled aristocrats. Napoleon instituted a modern, efficient tax system that guaranteed a steady flow of revenues and made long-term financing possible.

Napoleon kept the system of conscription that had been created in the 1790s, so that every young man served in the army, which could be rapidly expanded even as it was based on a core of careerists and talented officers. Before the Revolution the aristocracy formed the officer corps. Now promotion was by merit and achievement—every private carried a marshal's baton, it was said.

The modern era of French education began in the 1790s. The Revolution in the 1790s abolished the traditional universities. Napoleon sought to replace them with new institutions, the École Polytechnique, focused on technology. The elementary schools received little attention.

==== Napoleonic Code ====
Of permanent importance was the Napoleonic Code created by eminent jurists under Napoleon's supervision. Praised for its clarity, it spread rapidly throughout Europe and the world in general, and marked the end of feudalism and the liberation of serfs where it took effect. The Code recognized the principles of civil liberty, equality before the law, and the secular character of the state. It discarded the old right of primogeniture (where only the eldest son inherited) and required that inheritances be divided equally among all the children. The court system was standardized; all judges were appointed by the national government in Paris.

== 1815–1914 ==
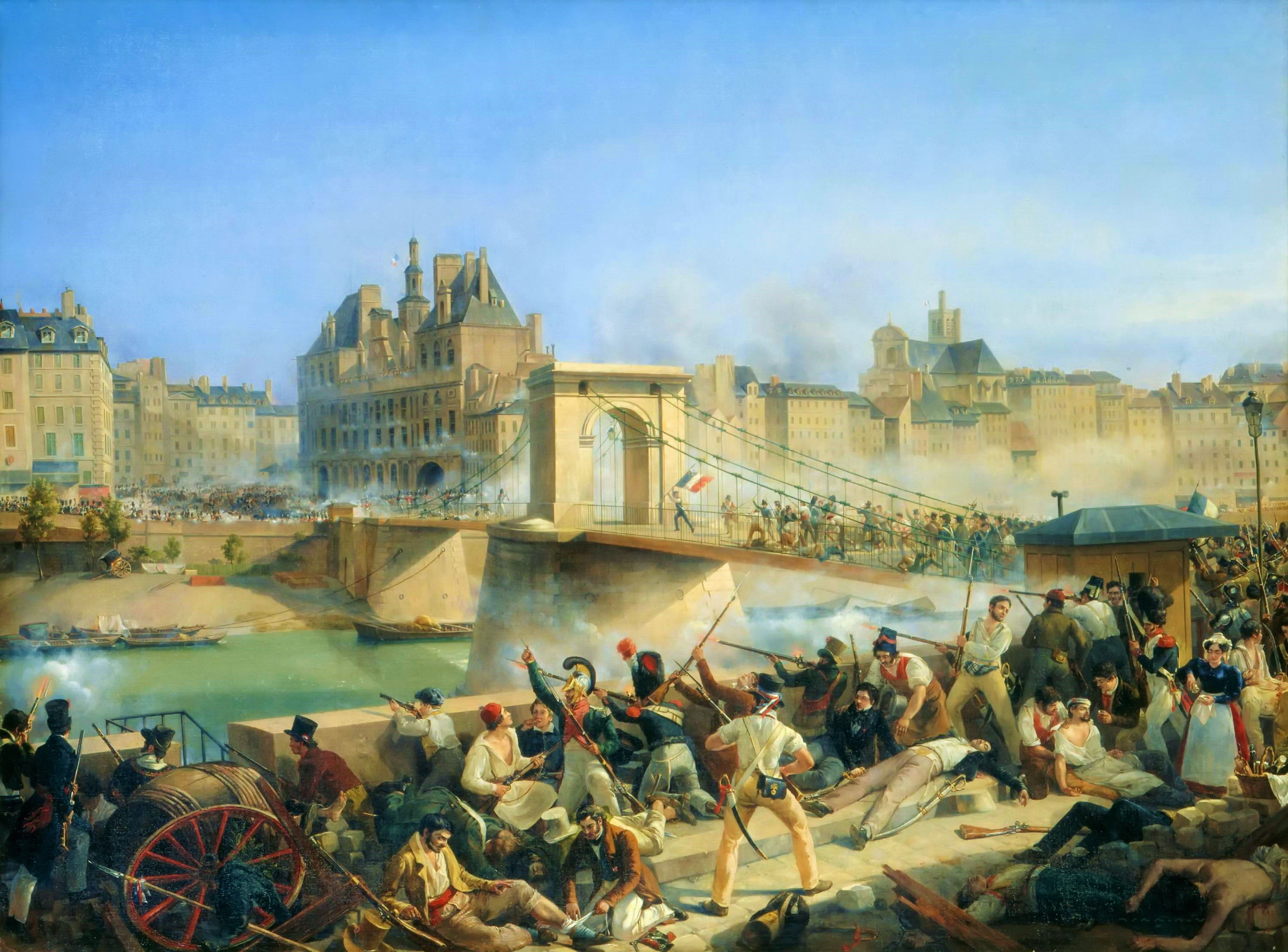
The taking of the Hôtel de Ville – the seat of Paris's government – during the July Revolution of 1830

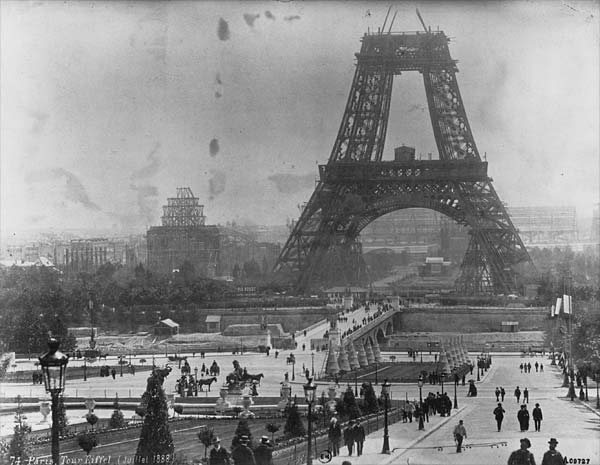
The Eiffel Tower under construction in July 1888

The century after the fall of Napoleon I was politically unstable:

Every [French] head of state from 1814 to 1873 spent part of his life in exile. Every regime was the target of assassination attempts of a frequency that put Spanish and Russian politics in the shade. Even in peaceful times governments changed every few months. In less peaceful times, political deaths, imprisonments and deportations are literally incalculable.

The period from 1789 to 1914, dubbed the "Long nineteenth century" by the historian Eric Hobsbawm, extends from the French Revolution's aftermath to the brink of World War I. Throughout this period, France underwent significant transformations that reshaped its geography, demographics, language, and economic landscape, marking a period of profound change and development. The French Revolution and Napoleonic eras fundamentally altered French society, promoting centralization, administrative uniformity across departments, and a standardized legal code. Education also centralized, emphasizing technical training and meritocracy, despite growing conservatism among the aristocracy and the church. Wealth concentration saw the richest 10 percent owning most of the nation's wealth. The 19th century saw France expanding to nearly its modern territorial limits through annexations and overseas imperialism, notably in Algeria, Indochina, and Africa. Despite territorial gains, France faced challenges, including a slow population growth, compared to its European neighbors, and a late industrialization that saw a shift from rural to urban living and the rise of an industrial workforce.

The period was also marked by significant linguistic and educational reforms, which sought to unify the country through language and secular education, contributing to a stronger national identity. Economically, France struggled to match the industrial growth rates of other advanced nations, maintaining a more traditional economy longer than its counterparts. Politically, the century was characterized by the end of the ancien régime, the rise and fall of the First and Second Empires, the tumultuous establishment of the Third Republic, and the radical experiment of the Paris Commune, reflecting the ongoing struggle between revolutionary ideals and conservative restoration.

Significant social and political reforms marked Napoleon III's era, introducing measures like public assistance and regulations to improve working and living conditions for the lower classes. The Second Empire (1852–1870) sought modernization through infrastructure projects like the railway system, yet Napoleon III's foreign policy ventures often ended in failure, notably the catastrophic Franco-Prussian War which led to his capture and deposition. The Third Republic embarked on modernizing France, with educational reforms and attempts to create a unified national identity. Foreign policy focused on isolation of Germany and forming alliances, leading to the Triple Entente. Domestically, issues like the Dreyfus affair highlighted the nation's divisions, while laws aimed at reducing the Catholic Church's influence sparked further controversy.

Cultural and artistic movements, from Romanticism to Modernism, mirrored these societal changes, contributing to France's rich cultural legacy. The Belle Époque emerged as a period of cultural flourishing and peace, overshadowed by the growing threats of war and internal discord. The long 19th century set the foundations for modern France, navigating through revolutions, wars, and social upheavals to emerge as a unified nation-state near the front of the global stage, by the early 20th century.

== Colonial empire ==
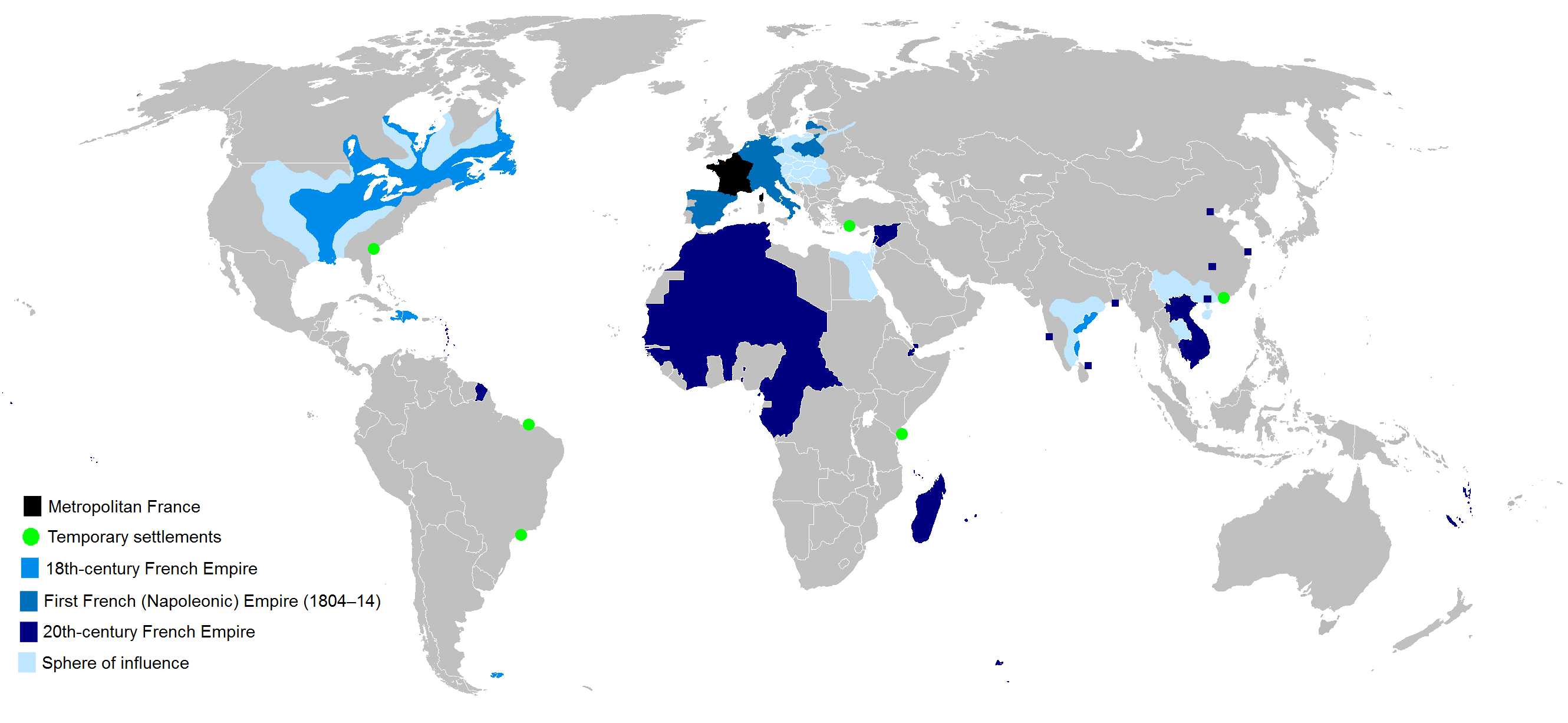
French empire, 17th-20th centuries. Dark blue = Second Empire 1830–1960.

The second colonial empire constituted the overseas colonies, protectorates and mandate territories that came under French rule from the 16th century onward. A distinction is generally made between the "first colonial empire", that existed until 1814, by which time most of it had been lost, and the "second colonial empire", which began with the conquest of Algiers in 1830. The second colonial empire came to an end after the loss in later wars of Vietnam (1954) and Algeria (1962), and relatively peaceful decolonizations elsewhere after 1960.

France lost wars to Britain that stripped away nearly all of its colonies by 1765. France rebuilt a new empire mostly after 1850, concentrating chiefly in Africa as well as Indochina and the South Pacific. Republicans, at first hostile to empire, only became supportive when Germany after 1880 started to build their own colonial empire. As it developed, the new empire took on roles of trade with France, especially supplying raw materials and purchasing manufactured items as well as lending prestige to the motherland and spreading French civilization and language and the Catholic religion. It also provided manpower in the World Wars.

It became a moral mission to lift the world up to French standards by bringing Christianity and French culture. In 1884, the leading proponent of colonialism, Jules Ferry, declared; "The higher races have a right over the lower races, they have a duty to civilize the inferior races." Full citizenship rights – assimilation – were offered. In reality the French settlers were given full rights and the natives given very limited rights. Apart from Algeria few settlers permanently settled in its colonies. Even in Algeria, the "Pied-Noir" (French settlers) always remained a small minority.

At its apex, it was one of the largest empires in history. Including metropolitan France, the total amount of land under French sovereignty reached 11,500,000 km^{2} (4,400,000 sq mi) in 1920, with a population of 110 million people in 1939. In World War II, the Free French used the overseas colonies as bases from which they fought to liberate France. "In an effort to restore its world-power status after the humiliation of defeat and occupation, France was eager to maintain its overseas empire at the end of the Second World War." Only two days after the defeat of Nazi Germany, France suppressed Algerian calls for independence, who were celebrating VE day, ending in a massacre, which killed at least 30,000 Muslims. However, gradually anti-colonial movements successfully challenged European authority. The French Constitution of 27 October 1946 (Fourth Republic), established the French Union which endured until 1958. Newer remnants of the colonial empire were integrated into France as overseas departments and territories within the French Republic. These now total about 1% of the pre-1939 colonial area, with 2.7 million people living in them in 2013. By the 1970s, the last "vestiges of empire held little interest for the French. ... Except for the traumatic decolonization of Algeria, however, what is remarkable is how few long-lasting effects on France the giving up of empire entailed."

== 1914–1945 ==
=== Population trends ===
The population held steady from 40.7 million in 1911, to 41.5 million in 1936. The sense that the population was too small, especially in regard to the rapid growth of more powerful Germany, was a common theme in the early twentieth century. Natalist policies were proposed in the 1930s, and implemented in the 1940s.

France experienced a baby boom after 1945; it reversed a long-term record of low birth rates. In addition, there was steady immigration, especially from former French colonies in North Africa. The population grew from 41 million in 1946, to 50 million in 1966, and 60 million by 1990. The farming population declined sharply, from 35% of the workforce in 1945 to under 5% by 2000. By 2004, France had the second highest birthrate in Europe.

=== World War I ===
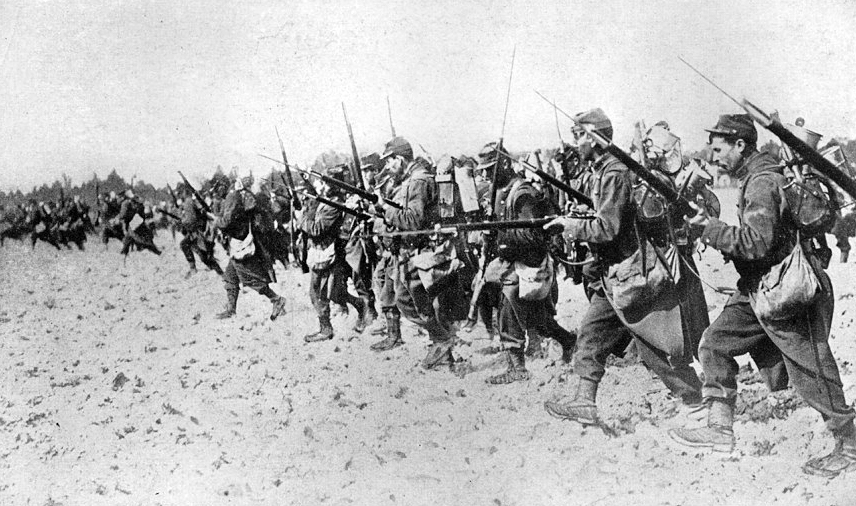
A French bayonet charge in 1913

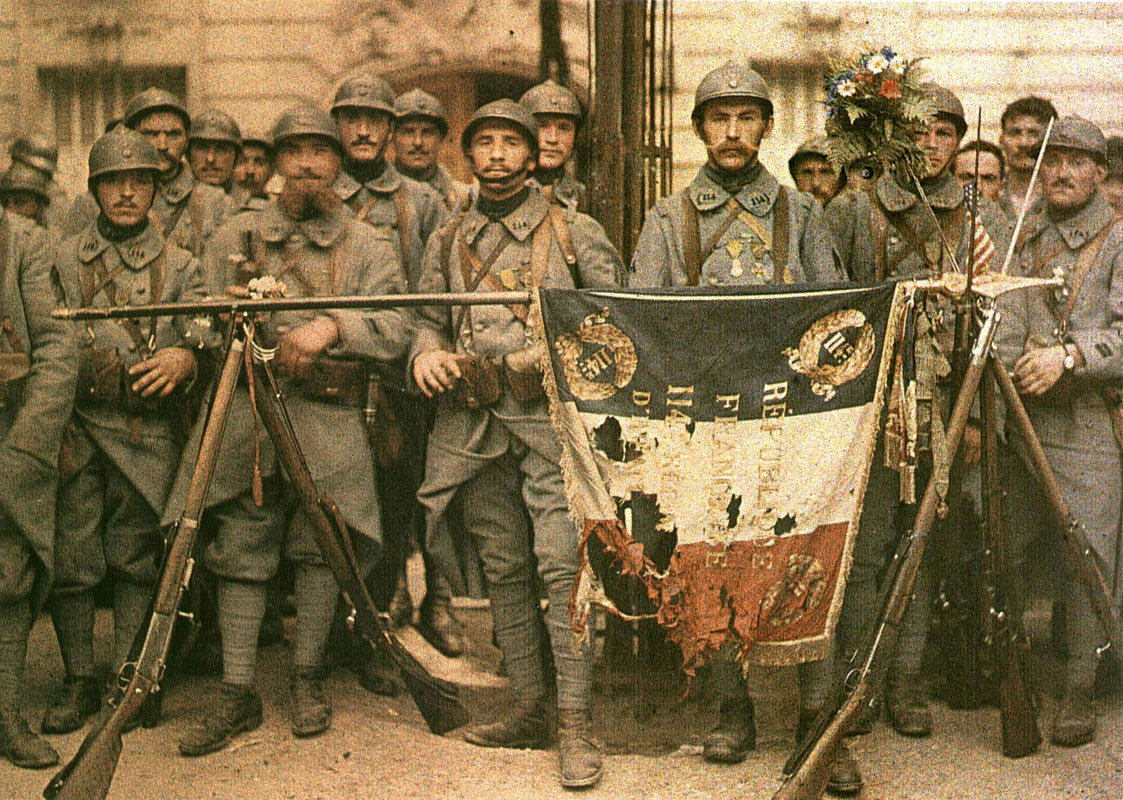
The 114th infantry in Paris, 14 July 1917

Preoccupied with internal problems, France paid little attention to foreign policy in the 1911–14 period, although it did extend military service to three years from two over strong Socialist objections in 1913. The rapidly escalating Balkan crisis of 1914 caught France unaware, and it played only a small role in the coming of World War I. The Serbian crisis triggered a complex set of military alliances between European states, causing most of the continent, including France, to be drawn into war within a few short weeks. Austria-Hungary declared war on Serbia in late July, triggering Russian mobilization. On 1 August both Germany and France ordered mobilization. Germany was much better prepared militarily than any of the other countries involved, including France. The German Empire, as an ally of Austria, declared war on Russia. France was allied with Russia and so was ready to commit to war against the German Empire. On 3 August Germany declared war on France, and sent its armies through neutral Belgium. Britain entered the war on 4 August, and started sending in troops on 7 August. Italy, although tied to Germany, remained neutral and then joined the Allies in 1915.

Germany's "Schlieffen Plan" was to quickly defeat the French. They captured Brussels, Belgium by 20 August and soon had captured a large portion of northern France. The original plan was to continue southwest and attack Paris from the west. By early September they were within 65 kilometres (40 mi) of Paris, and the French government had relocated to Bordeaux. The Allies finally stopped the advance northeast of Paris at the Marne River (5–12 September 1914).

The war now became a stalemate – the famous "Western Front" was fought largely in France and was characterized by very little movement despite extremely large and violent battles, often with new and more destructive military technology. On the Western Front, the small improvised trenches of the first few months rapidly grew deeper and more complex, gradually becoming vast areas of interlocking defensive works. The land war quickly became dominated by the muddy, bloody stalemate of Trench warfare, a form of war in which both opposing armies had static lines of defense. The war of movement quickly turned into a war of position. Neither side advanced much, but both sides suffered hundreds of thousands of casualties. German and Allied armies produced essentially a matched pair of trench lines from the Swiss border in the south to the North Sea coast of Belgium. Meanwhile, large swaths of northeastern France came under the brutal control of German occupiers.

Trench warfare prevailed on the Western Front from September 1914 until March 1918. Famous battles in France include the Battle of Verdun and the Battle of the Somme in 1916, and five separate conflicts called the Battle of Ypres (from 1914 to 1918).

After Socialist leader Jean Jaurès, a pacifist, was assassinated at the start of the war, the French socialist movement abandoned its antimilitarist positions and joined the national war effort. Prime Minister René Viviani called for unity—for a "Union sacrée" ("Sacred Union")--Which was a wartime truce between the right and left factions that had been fighting bitterly. France had few dissenters. However, war-weariness was a major factor by 1917, even reaching the army. The soldiers were reluctant to attack; Mutiny was a factor as soldiers said it was best to wait for the arrival of millions of Americans. The soldiers were protesting not just the futility of frontal assaults in the face of German machine guns but also degraded conditions at the front lines and at home, especially infrequent leaves, poor food, the use of African and Asian colonials on the home front, and concerns about the welfare of their wives and children.

After defeating Russia in 1917, Germany now could concentrate on the Western Front, and planned an all-out assault in the spring of 1918, but had to do it before the very rapidly growing American army played a role. In March 1918 Germany launched its offensive and by May had reached the Marne and was again close to Paris. However, in the Second Battle of the Marne (15 July to 6 August 1918), the Allied line held. The Allies then shifted to the offensive. The Germans, out of reinforcements, were overwhelmed day after day and the high command saw it was hopeless. Austria and Turkey collapsed, and the Kaiser's government fell. Germany signed "The Armistice" that ended the fighting effective 11 November 1918, "the eleventh hour of the eleventh day of the eleventh month."

=== Wartime losses ===
The war was fought in large part on French soil, with 3.4 million French dead including civilians, and four times as many military casualties. The economy was hurt by the 1914 German invasion of major industrial areas in the northeast, which produced 58% of the steel, and 40% of the coal. In 1914, the government implemented a war economy with controls and rationing. By 1915 the war economy went into high gear, as millions of French women and colonial men replaced the civilian roles of many of the 3 million soldiers. Considerable assistance came with the influx of American food, money and raw materials in 1917. This war economy would have important reverberations after the war, as it would be a first breach of liberal theories of non-interventionism. The damages caused by the war amounted to about 113% of the GDP of 1913, chiefly the destruction of productive capital and housing. The national debt rose from 66% of GDP in 1913 to 170% in 1919, reflecting the heavy use of bond issues to pay for the war. Inflation was severe, with the franc losing over half its value against the British pound.

The richest families were hurt, as the top 1 percent saw their share of wealth drop from about 60% in 1914 to 36% in 1935, then plunge to 20 percent in 1970 to the present. A great deal of physical and financial damage was done during the world wars, foreign investments were cashed in to pay for the wars, the Russian Bolsheviks expropriated large-scale investments, postwar inflation demolished cash holdings, stocks and bonds plunged during the Great Depression, and progressive taxes ate away at accumulated wealth.

=== Postwar settlement ===
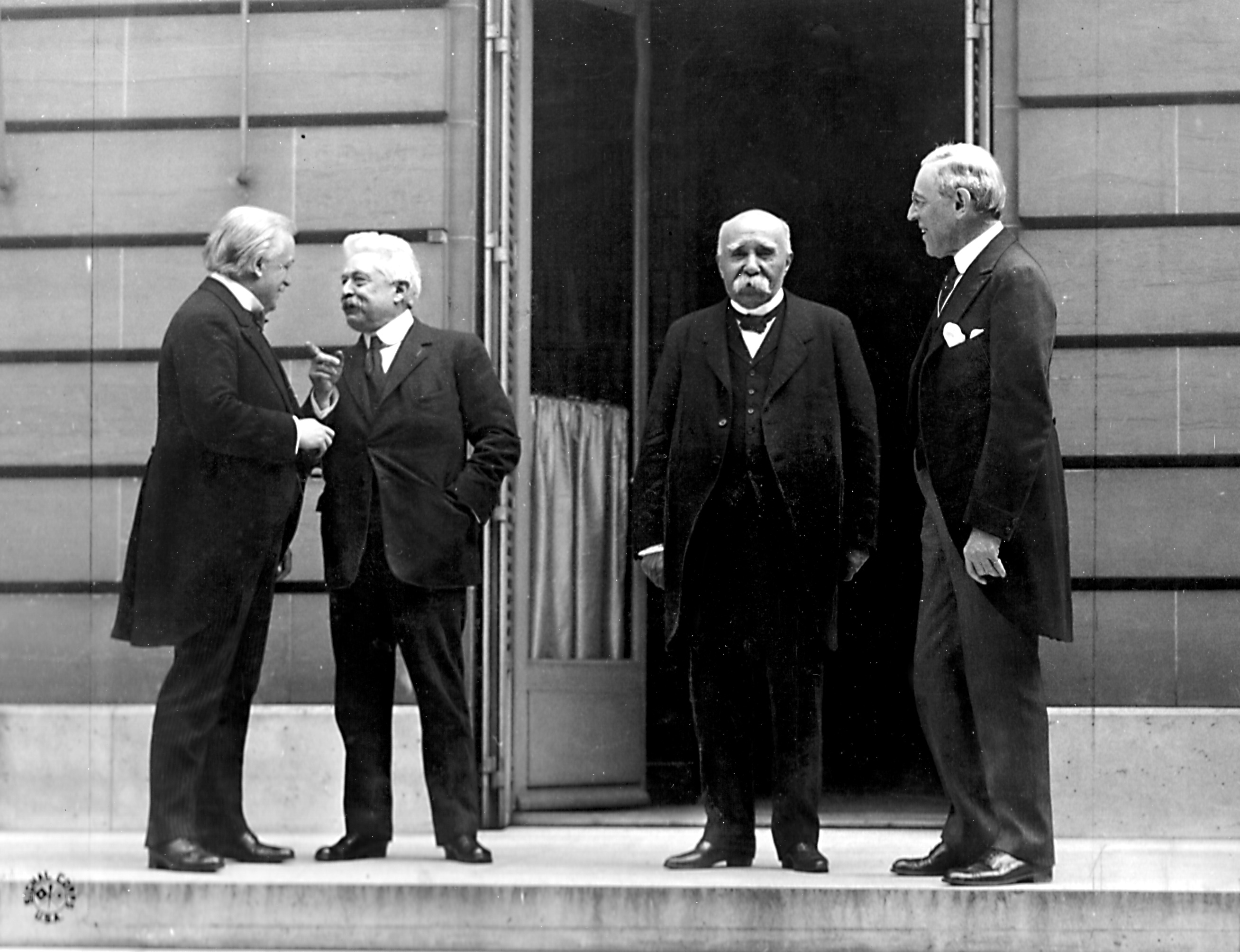
The Council of Four (from left to right): David Lloyd George, Vittorio Emanuele Orlando, Georges Clemenceau, and Woodrow Wilson in Versailles.

Peace terms were imposed by the Big Four, meeting in Paris in 1919: David Lloyd George of Britain, Vittorio Orlando of Italy, Georges Clemenceau of France, and Woodrow Wilson of the United States. Clemenceau demanded the harshest terms and won most of them in the Treaty of Versailles in 1919. Germany was forced to admit its guilt for starting the war, and was permanently weakened militarily. Germany had to pay huge sums in war reparations to the Allies (who in turn had large loans from the U.S. to pay off).

France regained Alsace-Lorraine and occupied the German industrial Saar Basin, a coal and steel region. The German African colonies were put under League of Nations mandates, and were administered by France and other victors. From the remains of the Ottoman Empire, France acquired the Mandate of Syria and the Mandate of Lebanon. French Marshal Ferdinand Foch wanted a peace that would never allow Germany to be a threat to France again, but after the Treaty of Versailles was signed he said, "This is not a peace. It is an armistice for 20 years."

=== Interwar years: Foreign policy and Great Depression ===
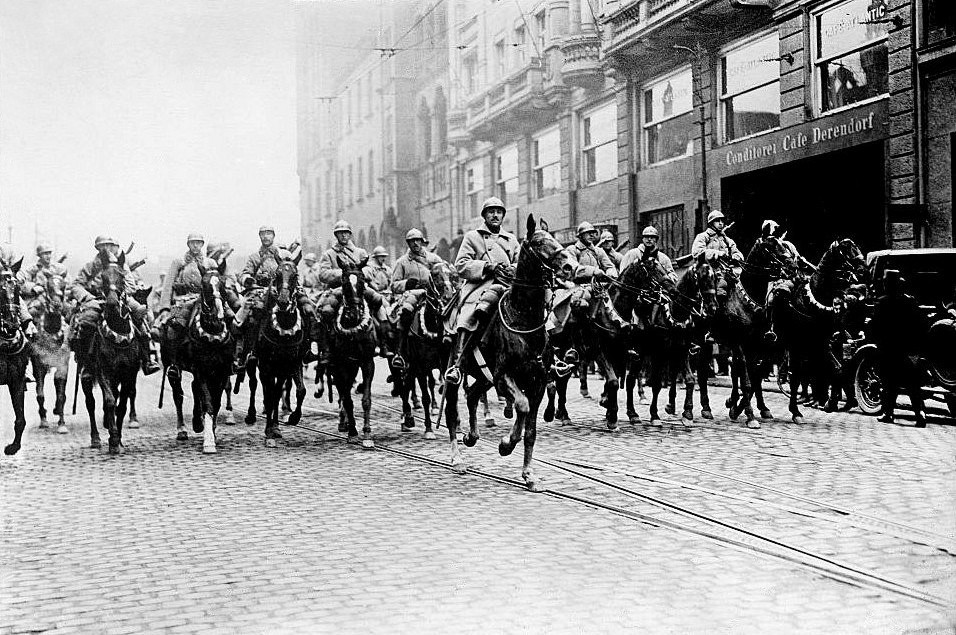
French cavalry entering Essen during the Occupation of the Ruhr

France was part of the Allied force that occupied the Rhineland following the Armistice. Foch supported Poland in the Greater Poland Uprising and in the Polish–Soviet War and France also joined Spain during the Rif War. From 1925 until his death in 1932, Aristide Briand, as Prime Minister during five short intervals, directed French foreign policy, using his diplomatic skills and sense of timing to forge friendly relations with Weimar Germany as the basis of a genuine peace within the framework of the League of Nations. He realized France could neither contain the much larger Germany by itself nor secure effective support from Britain or the League.

As a response to the Weimar Republic's default on its reparations in the aftermath of World War I, France occupied the industrial region of the Ruhr as a means of ensuring German payments. The intervention was a failure, and France accepted the international solution to the reparations issues, as expressed in the Dawes Plan and the Young Plan.

Politically, the 1920s was dominated by the Right, with right-wing coalitions in 1919, 1926, and 1928, and later in 1934 and 1938.

In the 1920s, France established an elaborate system of border defences called the Maginot Line, designed to fight off any German attack. The Line did not extend into Belgium, which Germany would exploit in 1940. Military alliances were signed with weak powers in 1920–21, called the "Little Entente".

The Great Depression affected France a bit later than other countries, hitting around 1931. While the GDP in the 1920s grew at the very strong rate of 4.43% per year, the 1930s rate fell to only 0.63%. The depression was relatively mild: unemployment peaked under 5%, the fall in production was at most 20% below the 1929 output; there was no banking crisis.

In contrast to the mild economic upheaval, the political upheaval was enormous. Socialist Leon Blum, leading the Popular Front, brought together Socialists and Radicals to become Prime Minister from 1936 to 1937; he was the first Jew and the first Socialist to lead France. The Communists in the Chamber of Deputies voted to keep the government in power, and generally supported the government's economic policies, but rejected its foreign policies. The Popular Front passed numerous labor reforms, which increased wages, cut working hours to 40 hours with overtime illegal and provided many lesser benefits to the working class such as mandatory two-week paid vacations. However, renewed inflation cancelled the gains in wage rates, unemployment did not fall, and economic recovery was very slow. The Popular Front failed in economics, foreign policy, and long-term stability: "Disappointment and failure was the legacy of the Popular Front." At first the Popular Front created enormous excitement and expectations on the left—including very large scale sitdown strikes—but in the end it failed to live up to its promise. However, Socialists would later take inspiration from the attempts of the Popular Front to set up a welfare state.

The government joined Britain in establishing an arms embargo during the Spanish Civil War (1936–1939). Blum rejected support for the Spanish Republicans because of his fear that civil war might spread to deeply divided France. Financial support in military cooperation with Poland was also a policy. The government nationalized arms suppliers, and dramatically increased its program of rearming the French military in a last-minute catch-up with the Germans.

Appeasement of Germany, in cooperation with Britain, was the policy after 1936, as France sought peace even in the face of Hitler's escalating demands. Prime Minister Édouard Daladier refused to go to war against Germany and Italy without British support as Neville Chamberlain wanted to save peace at Munich in 1938.

=== World War II ===
German soldiers on parade marching past the Arc de Triomphe

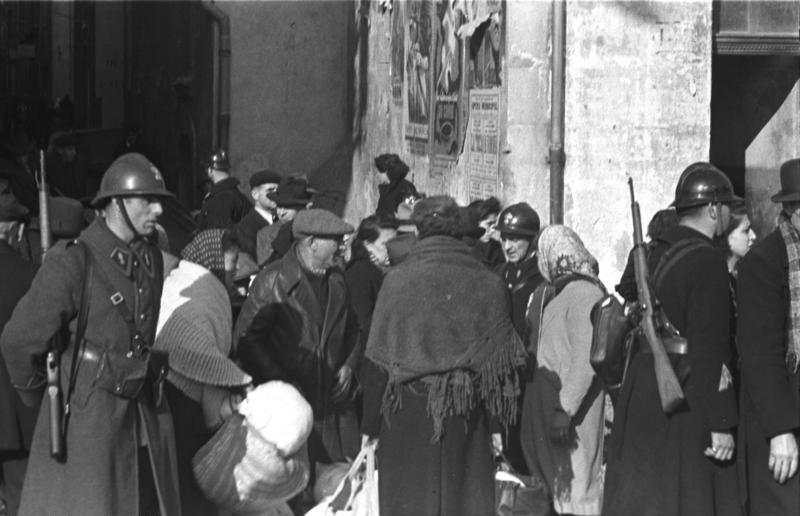
Vichy police escorting French Jewish citizens for deportation during the Marseille roundup, January 1943

Germany's invasion of Poland in 1939 finally caused France and Britain to declare war against Germany. But the Allies did not launch massive assaults and instead kept a defensive stance: this was called the Phoney War in Britain or Drôle de guerre — the funny sort of war — in France. It did not prevent the German army from conquering Poland in a matter of weeks with its innovative Blitzkrieg tactics, also helped by the Soviet Union's attack on Poland.

When Germany had its hands free for an attack in the west, the Battle of France began in May 1940, and the same Blitzkrieg tactics proved just as devastating there. The Wehrmacht bypassed the Maginot Line by marching through the Ardennes forest. A second German force was sent into Belgium and the Netherlands to act as a diversion to this main thrust. In six weeks of savage fighting the French lost 90,000 men.

Many civilians sought refuge by taking to the roads of France: some 2 million refugees from Belgium and the Netherlands were joined by between 8 and 10 million French civilians, representing a quarter of the French population, all heading south and west. This movement may well have been the largest single movement of civilians in history prior to the Partition of India in 1947.

Paris fell to the Germans on 14 June 1940, but not before the British Expeditionary Force was evacuated from Dunkirk, along with many French soldiers.

Vichy France was established on 10 July 1940 to govern the unoccupied part of France and its colonies. It was led by Philippe Pétain, the aging war hero of the First World War. Petain's representatives signed a harsh Armistice on 22 June, whereby Germany kept most of the French army in camps in Germany, and France had to pay out large sums in gold and food supplies. Germany occupied three-fifths of France's territory, leaving the rest in the southeast to the new Vichy government. However, in practice, most local government was handled by the traditional French officialdom. In November 1942 all of Vichy France was finally occupied by German forces. Vichy continued in existence but it was closely supervised by the Germans.

The Vichy regime sought to collaborate with Germany, keeping peace in France to avoid further occupation although at the expense of personal freedom and individual safety. Some 76,000 Jews were deported during the German occupation, often with the help of the Vichy authorities, and murdered in the Nazis' extermination camps.

==== Women in Vichy France ====
The French soldiers held as POWs and forced laborers in Germany throughout the war were not at risk of death in combat, but the anxieties of separation for their wives were high. The government provided them a modest allowance, but one in ten became prostitutes to support their families. It gave women a key symbolic role to carry out the national regeneration. It used propaganda, women's organizations, and legislation to promote maternity, patriotic duty, and female submission to marriage, home, and children's education. Conditions were very difficult for housewives, as food and other necessities were in short supply. Divorce laws were made much more stringent, and restrictions were placed on the employment of married women. Family allowances that had begun in the 1930s were continued, and became a vital lifeline for many families; it was a monthly cash bonus for having more children. In 1942, the birth rate started to rise, and by 1945 it was higher than it had been for a century.

==== Resistance ====
General Charles de Gaulle in London declared himself on BBC radio to be the head of a rival government in exile, and gathered the Free French Forces around him, finding support in some French colonies and recognition from Britain but not the United States. After the Attack on Mers-el-Kébir in 1940, where the British fleet destroyed a large part of the French navy, still under command of Vichy France, that killed about 1,100 sailors, there was nationwide indignation and a feeling of distrust in the French forces, leading to the events of the Battle of Dakar. Eventually, several important French ships joined the Free French Forces. The United States maintained diplomatic relations with Vichy and avoided recognition of de Gaulle's claim to be the one and only government of France. Churchill, caught between the U.S. and de Gaulle, tried to find a compromise.

Within France proper, the organized underground grew as the Vichy regime resorted to more strident policies in order to fulfill the enormous demands of the Nazis and the eventual decline of Nazi Germany became more obvious. They formed the Resistance. The most famous figure of the French resistance was Jean Moulin, sent in France by de Gaulle in order to link all resistance movements; he was captured and tortured by Klaus Barbie (the "butcher of Lyon"). Increasing repression culminated in the complete destruction and extermination of the village of Oradour-sur-Glane at the height of the Battle of Normandy. On 10 June 1944, a company of the 2nd SS Panzer Division, entered Oradour-sur-Glane, and massacred 642 men, women and children, all of whom were civilians. In 1953, 21 men went on trial for the Oradour killings; all but one were pardoned by the French government.

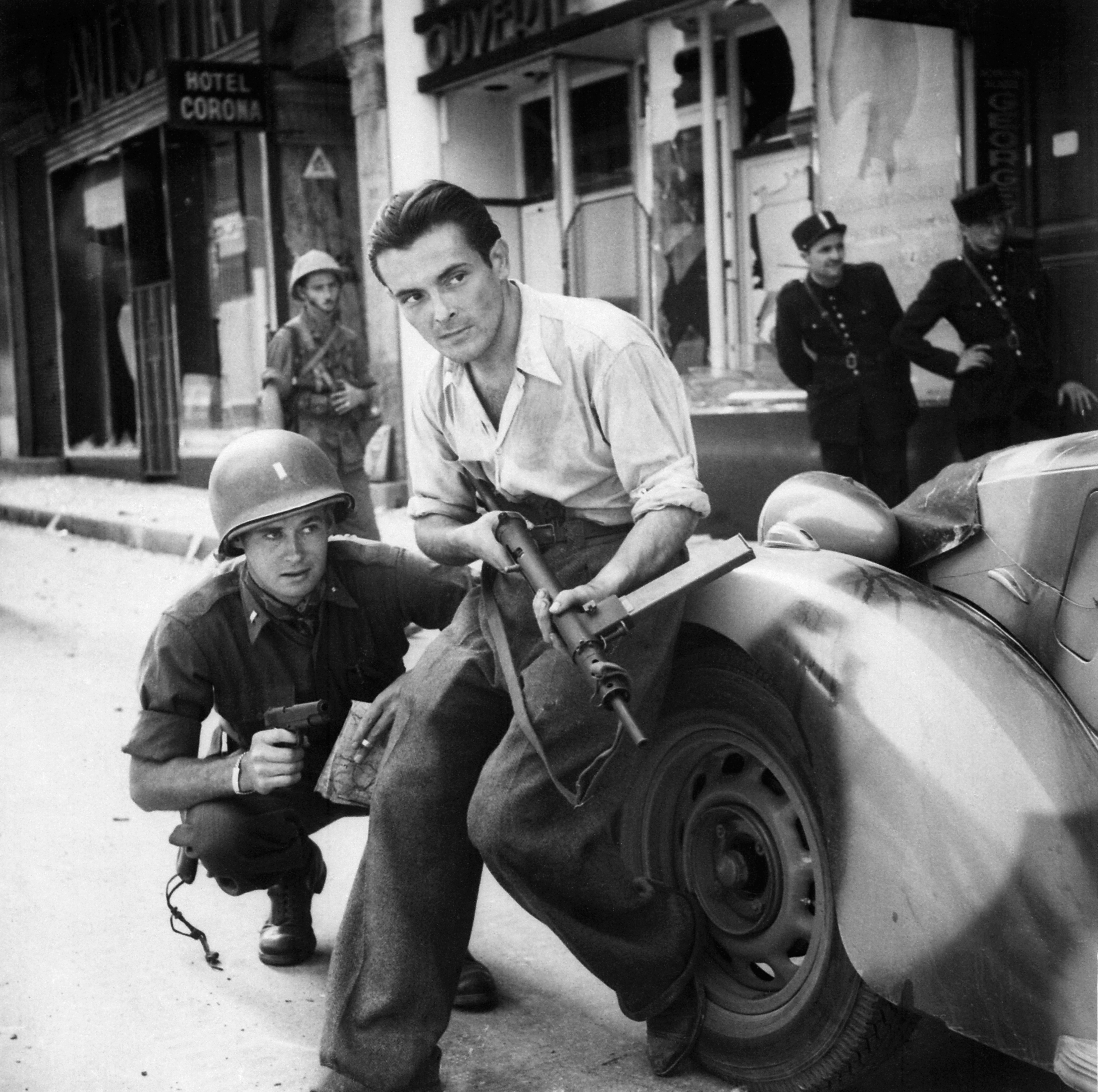
A Resistance fighter during street fighting in 1944

On 6 June 1944, the Allies landed in Normandy, with a French component. On 15 August Allied forces landing in Provence, this time including 260,000 men of the French First Army. The German lines finally broke, and they fled back to Germany while keeping control of some of the major ports. Allied forces liberated France and the Free French were given the honor of liberating Paris in late August. The French army recruited French Forces of the Interior (de Gaulle's formal name for resistance fighters) to continue the war until the final defeat of Germany; this army numbered 300,000 men by September, and 370,000 by spring 1945.

The Vichy regime disintegrated. An interim Provisional Government of the French Republic was quickly put into place by de Gaulle. The gouvernement provisoire de la République française, or GPRF, operated under a tripartisme alliance of communists, socialists, and democratic republicans. The GPRF governed France from 1944 to 1946, when it was replaced by the French Fourth Republic. Tens of thousands of collaborators were executed without trial. The new government declared the Vichy laws unconstitutional and illegal, and elected new local governments. Women gained the right to vote.

== Since 1945 ==
The political scene in 1944–45 was controlled by the Resistance, but it had numerous factions. Charles de Gaulle and the Free France element had been based outside France, but now came to dominate, in alliance with the Socialists, the Christian Democrats (MRP), and what remained of the Radical party. The Communists had largely dominated the Resistance inside France, but cooperated closely with the government in 1944–45, on orders from the Kremlin. There was a general consensus that important powers that had been an open collaboration with the Germans should be nationalized, such as Renault automobiles and the major newspapers. A new Social Security system was called for, as well as important new concessions to the labour unions. Unions themselves were divided among communist, Socialist, and Christian Democrat factions. Frustrated by his inability to control all the dominant forces, de Gaulle resigned in 1946. On 13 October 1946, a new constitution established the Fourth Republic. The Fourth Republic consisted of a parliamentary government controlled by a series of coalitions. France attempted to regain control of French Indochina but was defeated by the Viet Minh in 1954. Only months later, France faced another anti-colonialist conflict in Algeria and the debate over whether or not to keep control of Algeria, then home to over one million European settlers, wracked the country and nearly led to a coup and civil war. Charles de Gaulle managed to keep the country together while taking steps to end the war. The Algerian War was concluded with the Évian Accords in 1962 which led to Algerian independence.

The June 1951 elections saw a re-emergence of the right, and until June 1954 France was governed by a succession of centre-right coalitions.

=== Economic recovery ===
Wartime damage to the economy was severe, and apart from gold reserves, France had inadequate resources to recover on its own. The transportation system was in total shambles — the Allies had bombed out the railways and the bridges, and the Germans had destroyed the port facilities. Energy was in extremely short supply, with very low stocks of coal and oil. Imports of raw materials were largely cut off, so most factories shut down. The invaders had stripped most of the valuable industrial tools for German factories. Discussions with the United States for emergency aid dragged on, with repeated postponements on both sides. Meanwhile, several million French prisoners of war and forced labourers were being returned home, with few jobs and little food available for them. The plan was for 20 percent of German reparations to be paid to France, but Germany was in much worse shape even than France, and in no position to pay.

After de Gaulle left office in January 1946, the diplomatic logjam was broken in terms of American aid. The U.S. Army shipped in food, from 1944 to 1946, and U.S. Treasury loans and cash grants were disbursed from 1945 until 1947, with Marshall Plan aid continuing until 1951. France received additional aid from 1951 to 1955 in order to help the country in its war in Indochina. Apart from low-interest loans, the other funds were grants that did not involve repayment. The debts left over from World War I, whose payment had been suspended since 1931, were renegotiated in the Blum-Byrnes agreement of 1946. The United States forgave all $2.8 billion in debt from the First World War, and gave France a new loan of $650 million. In return, French negotiator Jean Monnet set out the French five-year plan for recovery and development. The Marshall Plan gave France $2.3 billion with no repayment. The total of all American grants and credits to France from 1946 to 1953, amounted to $4.9 billion.

A central feature of the Marshall Plan was to encourage international trade, reduce tariffs, lower barriers, and modernize French management. The Marshall Plan set up intensive tours of American industry. France sent missions of businessmen and experts to tour American factories, farms, stores and offices. They were especially impressed with the prosperity of American workers, and the low price of vehicles. Some French businesses resisted Americanization, but the most profitable, especially chemicals, oil, electronics, and instrumentation, seized upon the opportunity to attract American investments and build a larger market. The U.S. insisted on opportunities for Hollywood films, and the French film industry responded with new life.

Although the economic situation in France was grim in 1945, resources did exist and the economy regained normal growth by the 1950s. France managed to regain its international status thanks to a successful production strategy, a demographic spurt, and technical and political innovations. Conditions varied from firm to firm. Some had been destroyed or damaged, nationalized or requisitioned, but the majority carried on, sometimes working harder and more efficiently than before the war. Despite strong American pressure through the ERP, there was little change in the organization and content of the training for French industrial managers. This was mainly due to the reticence of the existing institutions, and the struggle among different economic and political interest groups for control over efforts to improve the further training of practitioners.

The Monnet Plan provided a coherent framework for economic policy, and it was strongly supported by the Marshall Plan. It was inspired by moderate, Keynesian free-trade ideas rather than state control. Although relaunched in an original way, the French economy was about as productive as comparable West European countries.

=== Vietnam and Algeria ===
Pierre Mendès France, was a Radical party leader who was Prime Minister for eight months in 1954–55, working with the support of the Socialist and Communist parties. His top priority was ending the deadly war in Indochina in the wake of the humiliating defeat at the Battle of Dien Bien Phu. The U.S. had paid most of the costs of the war, but its support inside France had collapsed. In February 1954, only 7% of the French people wanted to continue the fight to keep Indochina out of Ho Chi Minh and his Viet Minh movement. At the Geneva Conference in July 1954, Pierre France made a deal that gave the Viet Minh control of Vietnam north of the 17th parallel, and allowed France to pull out all its forces. That left South Vietnam standing alone, and the U.S. would provide support for it afterwards. Pierre France next came to an agreement with Habib Bourguiba, the nationalist leader in Tunisia, for the independence of that colony by 1956, and began discussions with Moroccan nationalists for a French withdrawal.

With over a million European residents in Algeria (the Pieds-Noirs), France refused to grant independence until the Algerian War of Independence had turned into a French political and civil crisis. Algeria won its independence in 1962, unleashing a massive wave of immigration from the former colony back to France of both Pied-Noir and Algerians who had supported France.

=== Suez Crisis (1956) ===
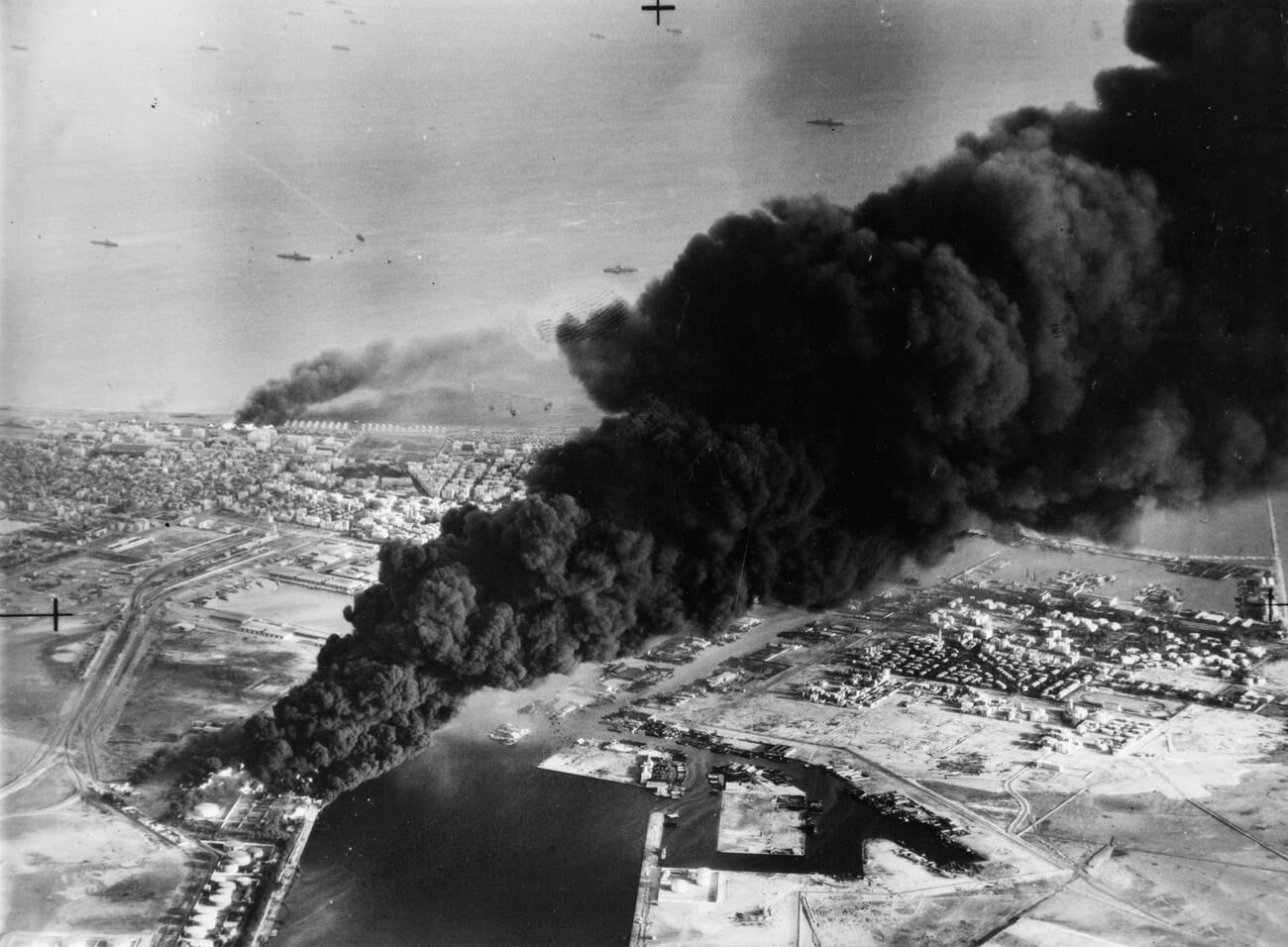
Smoke rises from oil tanks beside the Suez Canal hit during the initial Anglo-French assault on Port Said, 5 November 1956.

In 1956, another crisis struck French colonies, this time in Egypt. The Suez Canal, having been built by the French government, belonged to the French Republic and was operated by the Compagnie universelle du canal maritime de Suez. Great Britain had bought the Egyptian share from Isma'il Pasha and was the second-largest owner of the canal before the crisis.

The Egyptian President Gamal Abdel Nasser nationalized the canal despite French and British opposition; he determined that a European response was unlikely. Great Britain and France attacked Egypt and built an alliance with Israel against Nasser. Israel attacked from the east, Britain from Cyprus and France from Algeria. Egypt was defeated in a mere few days. The Suez crisis caused an outcry of indignation in the Arab world, and Saudi Arabia set an embargo on oil on France and Britain. U.S. President Dwight D. Eisenhower forced a ceasefire; Britain and Israel soon withdrew, leaving France alone in Egypt. Under strong international pressures, the French government ultimately evacuated its troops from Suez and largely disengaged from the Middle East.

=== President de Gaulle, 1958–1969 ===
The May 1958 seizure of power in Algiers by French army units and French settlers opposed to concessions in the face of Arab nationalist insurrection ripped apart the unstable Fourth Republic. The National Assembly brought De Gaulle back to power during the May 1958 crisis. He founded the Fifth Republic with a strengthened presidency, and he was elected in the latter role. He managed to keep France together while taking steps to end the war, much to the anger of the Pieds-Noirs (Frenchmen settled in Algeria) and the military; both had supported his return to power to maintain colonial rule. He granted independence to Algeria in 1962 and progressively to other French colonies.

Proclaiming grandeur essential to the nature of France, de Gaulle initiated his "Politics of Grandeur." He demanded complete autonomy for France in world affairs, which meant that major decisions could not be forced upon it by NATO, the European Community or anyone else. De Gaulle pursued a policy of "national independence." He vetoed Britain's entry into the Common Market, fearing it might gain too great a voice on French affairs. While not officially abandoning NATO, he withdrew from its military integrated command, fearing that the United States had too much control over NATO. He launched an independent nuclear development program that made France the fourth nuclear power. France then adopted the dissuasion du faible au fort doctrine which meant a Soviet attack on France would only bring total destruction to both sides.

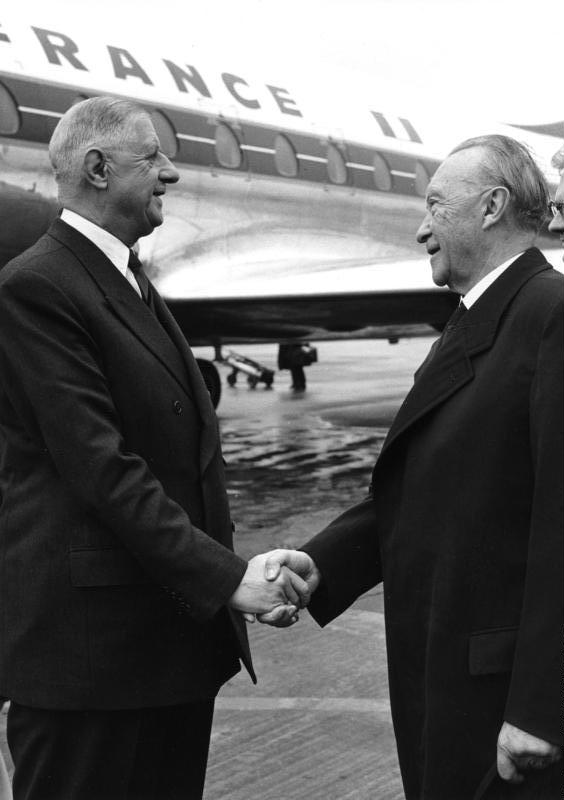
De Gaulle and Germany's Konrad Adenauer in 1961

He restored cordial Franco-German relations in order to create a European counterweight between the "Anglo-Saxon" (American and British) and Soviet spheres of influence. De Gaulle openly criticised the U.S. intervention in Vietnam. He was angry at American economic power, especially what his Finance minister called the "exorbitant privilege" of the U.S. dollar.

In May 1968, he appeared likely to lose power amidst widespread protests by students and workers, but persisted through the crisis with backing from the army. His party, denouncing radicalism, won the 1968 election with an increased majority in the Assembly. Nonetheless, de Gaulle resigned in 1969 after losing a referendum in which he proposed more decentralization.

=== Economic crises: 1970s-1980s ===
By the late 1960s, France's economic growth, while strong, was beginning to lose steam. A global currency crisis meant a devaluation of the Franc against the West German Mark and the U.S. Dollar in 1968, which was one of the leading factors for the social upheaval of that year. Industrial policy was used to bolster French industries.

The Trente Glorieuses era (1945–1975) ended with the worldwide 1973 oil crisis, which increased costs in energy and thus on production. Economic instability marked the Giscard d'Estaing government (1974–1981). Giscard turned to Prime Minister Raymond Barre in 1976, who advocated numerous complex, strict policies ("Barre Plans"). The plans included a three-month price freeze; wage controls; salary controls; a reduction of the growth in the money supply; increases in taxes and bank rates but a reduction in the value-added tax; measures to restore the trade balance; limits on expensive oil imports; special aid to exports; an action fund to aid industries; increased financial aid to farmers; and social security.

Economic troubles continued into the presidency of François Mitterrand. A recession in the early 1980s led to the abandonment of dirigisme, in favour of a more pragmatic approach to economic intervention. Growth resumed later in the decade, only to be slowed down by the economic depression of the early 1990s, which affected the Socialist Party.

France's recent economic history has been less turbulent than in many other countries. The average income in mid-century grew by 0.9% per year, a rate which has been outdone almost every year since 1975. By the early 1980s, for instance, wages in France were on or slightly above the EEC average.

=== 1989 to 2017 ===
After the fall of the USSR and the end of the Cold War, potential menaces to mainland France appeared considerably reduced. France began reducing its nuclear capacities and conscription was abolished in 2001. In 1990, France, led by Mitterrand, joined the short successful Gulf War against Iraq; the French participation to this war was called the Opération Daguet.

Jacques Chirac assumed office after a campaign focused on the need to combat France's high unemployment rate. The economy became strengthened. French leaders increasingly tied the future of France to the continued development of the European Union (EU). In 1992, France ratified the Maastricht Treaty establishing the EU. In 1999, the Euro was introduced to replace the Franc. France also became involved in joint European projects such as Airbus, the Galileo positioning system and the Eurocorps.

The French stood among the strongest supporters of NATO and EU policy in the Balkans, to prevent genocide in former Yugoslavia; French troops joined the 1999 NATO bombing of the country. France became actively involved in fighting against international terrorism. In 2002, Alliance Base, an international Counterterrorist Intelligence Center, was secretly established in Paris. France contributed to the toppling of the Taliban regime in Afghanistan, but it strongly rejected the 2003 invasion of Iraq.

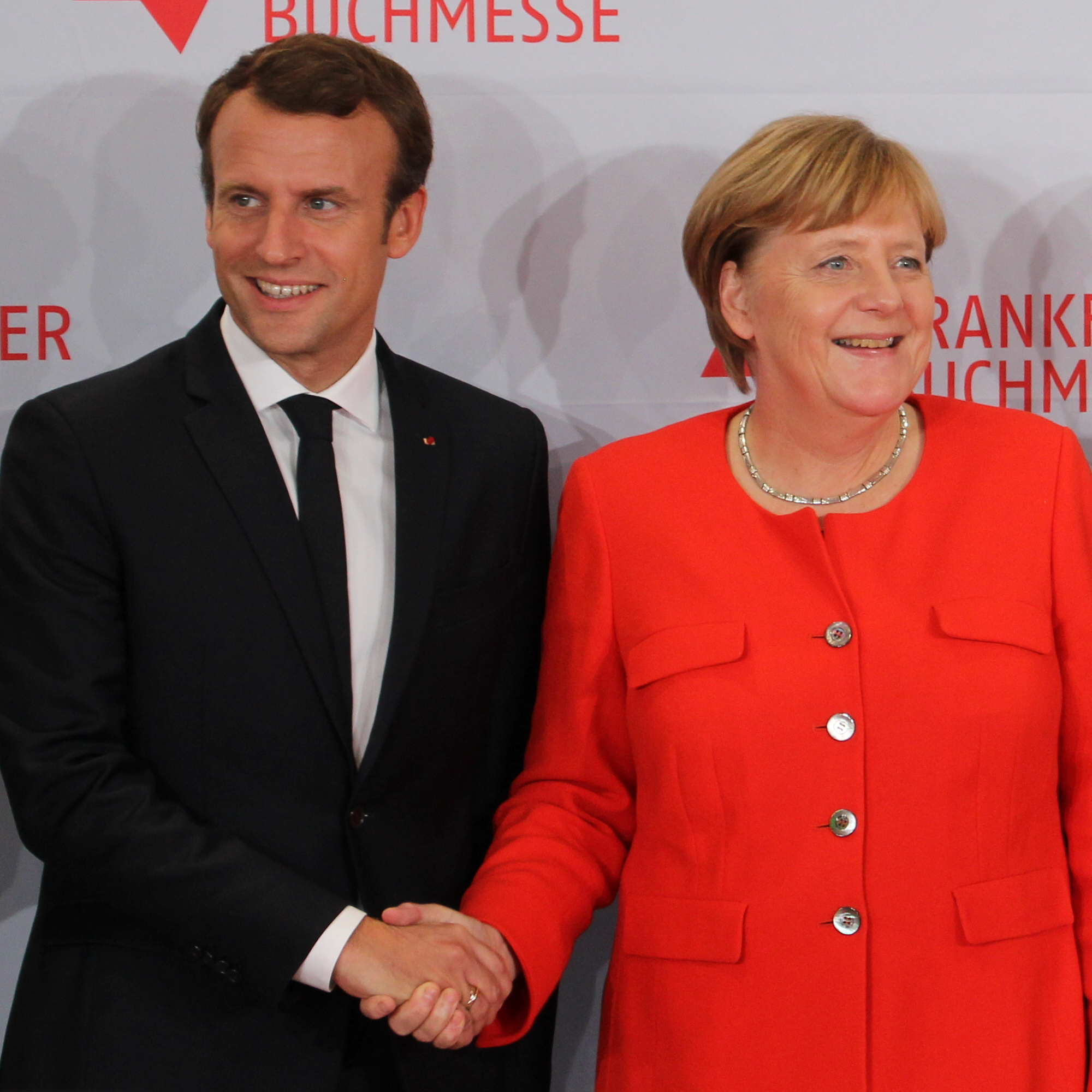
Emmanuel Macron and Germany's Angela Merkel in 2017

Jacques Chirac was reelected in 2002, and became a fierce opponent of the Iraq invasion. Conservative Nicolas Sarkozy was elected and took office in 2007. Sarkozy was very actively involved in the military operation in Libya to oust the Gaddafi government in 2011. After 2005, the world economy stagnated, and the 2008 global crisis (including its effects in both the Eurozone and France) dogged Sarkozy, who lost reelection in 2012 against Socialist Francois Hollande. Hollande advocated a growth policy in contrast to the austerity policy advocated by Germany's Angela Merkel as a way of dealing with the Euro area crisis.

==== Muslim tensions ====
At the close of the Algerian war, hundreds of thousands of Muslims, including some who had supported France (Harkis), settled permanently in France, especially in the larger cities where they lived in subsidized public housing, and suffered very high unemployment rates. In 2005, the predominantly Arab-immigrant suburbs of many French cities erupted in riots. Traditional interpretations say these race riots were spurred by radical Muslims or unemployed youth. Another view states that the riots reflected a broader problem of racism and police violence in France. In 2009, there were more riots.

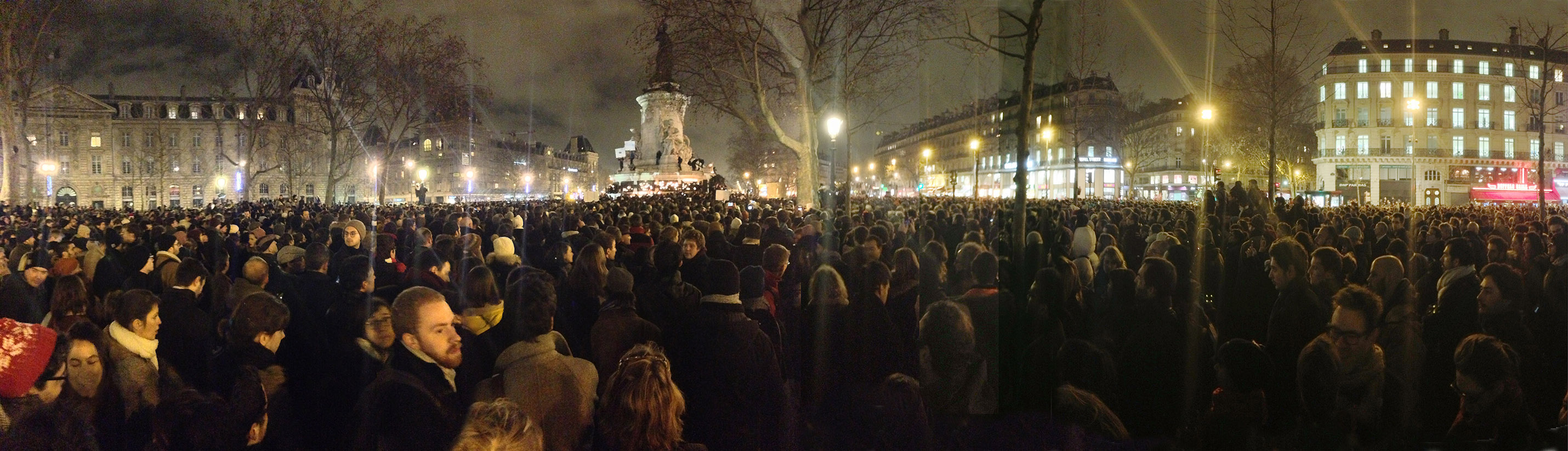
Over 1 million demonstrators gathering to pledge solidarity to liberal French values, in 2015 after the Charlie Hebdo shooting

In 2015, The New York Times summarized an ongoing conflict between France's secular and individualist values, and a growing Muslim conservatism. In 1994, Air France Flight 8969 was hijacked by terrorists; they were captured. In 2012, a Muslim radical shot three French soldiers and four Jewish citizens in Toulouse and Montauban. In January 2015, the satirical newspaper Charlie Hebdo and a Jewish grocery store came under attack from some angered Muslims in Paris. World leaders rallied to Paris to show their support for free speech. There were more terrorist attacks afterwards, including another series of attacks in Paris in November 2015, and a truck attack in Nice in 2016.

=== 2017 to present ===
In the 2017 election for president the winner was Emmanuel Macron, the founder of a new party "La République En Marche!" (later Renaissance RE). In the 2022 presidential election president Macron was re-elected after beating his far-right rival, Marine Le Pen, in the runoff.

The problem of high unemployment has yet to be resolved.

== See also ==
- H-FRANCE discussions and reviews by scholars
- Annales School, historiography
- Demographics of France, For population history
- Economic history of France
- Foreign relations of France, Since the 1950s
  - French colonial empire
  - History of French foreign relations, To 1954
  - International relations, 1648–1814
  - International relations of the Great Powers (1814–1919)
  - International relations (1919–1939).
  - Diplomatic history of World War I
  - Diplomatic history of World War II
  - Cold War
  - International relations since 1989
- French law
- French peasants
- French Revolution
  - Historiography of the French Revolution
- History of French journalism
- Legal history of France
- List of French monarchs
  - List of presidents of France
  - List of prime ministers of France
- Military history of France
- Politics of France
- Territorial evolution of France
- Timeline of French history
- Women in France
