= French Third Republic =

Government of France from 1870 to 1940

French Republic République française
- 1870–1940
- Flag
- Motto: Liberté, égalité, fraternité ("Liberty, Equality, Fraternity")
- Anthem: La Marseillaise
- The French Republic in August 1939: Metropolitan France; French protectorates

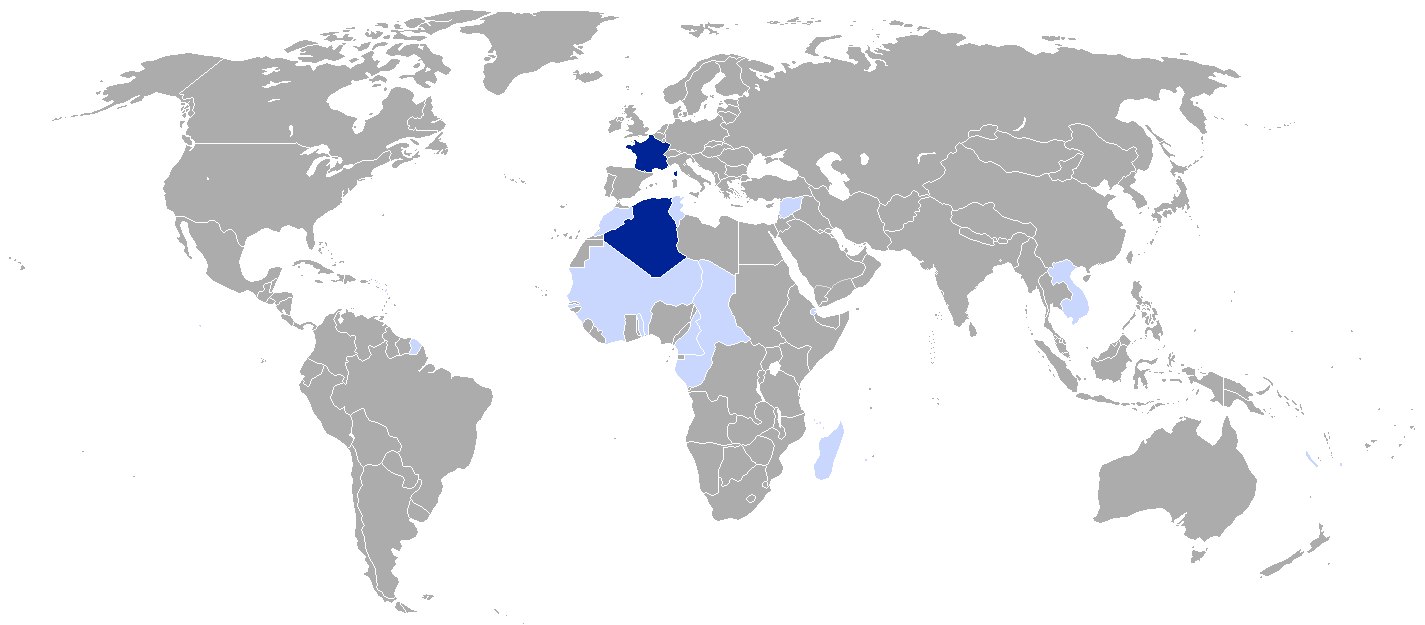
- Territories and colonies of the French Republic in 1939: Dark blue: Metropolitan territory; Light blue: Colonies, mandates, and protectorates
- Capital and largest city: Paris; 48°52′13″N 02°18′59″E
- Common languages: French (official); Gallo-Romance; Occitano-Romance; Gallo-Italic
- Religion: Roman Catholicism (Concordat of 1801 until 1905); Protestantism; Calvinism; Lutheranism; Judaism; Sunni Islam (in Algeria); Ibadi Islam (in Algeria)
- Demonym: French
- Government: Unitary parliamentary republic: (under a provisional government from 4 September 1870 to 13 February 1871)
- President
  - 1870–1871 (first): Louis-Jules Trochu
  - 1932–1940 (last): Albert Lebrun
- Prime Minister
  - 1870–1871 (first): Louis Jules Trochu
  - 1940 (last): Paul Reynaud
- Legislature: Parliament
  - Upper house: Senate
  - Lower house: Chamber of Deputies
- History
  - Proclamation by Leon Gambetta: 4 September 1870
  - Berlin Conference: 15 November 1884
  - France enters the Great War: 3 August 1914
  - Treaty of Versailles: 28 June 1919
  - France enters World War II: 3 September 1939
  - Battle of France: 10 May – 25 June 1940
  - Vichy France declared: 10 July 1940

Area
- 1894 (Metropolitan France): 536,464 km^{2} (207,130 sq mi)
- 1938 (including colonies): 13,500,000 km^{2} (5,200,000 sq mi)

Population
  - 1938 (including colonies): 150,000,000
- Currency: French franc
Preceded by
1870: Second French Empire
1918: Alsace–Lorraine Soviet Republic
Succeeded by
1871: Alsace–Lorraine
1940: German military administration
Italian military administration
German military administration of Belgium
Vichy France

The French Third Republic (French: Troisième République, sometimes written as La III^{e} République) was the system of government adopted in France from 4 September 1870, when the Second French Empire collapsed during the Franco-Prussian War, until 10 July 1940, after the Fall of France during World War II led to the formation of the Vichy government. The French Third Republic was a parliamentary republic.

The early days of the French Third Republic were dominated by political disruption caused by the Franco-Prussian War of 1870–1871, which the Third Republic continued to wage after the fall of Emperor Napoleon III in 1870. Social upheaval and the Paris Commune preceded the final defeat. The German Empire, proclaimed by the invaders in the Palace of Versailles, annexed the French regions of Alsace (apart from the Territoire de Belfort) and Lorraine (the northeastern part, i.e. present-day department of Moselle). The early governments of the French Third Republic considered re-establishing the monarchy, but disagreement as to the nature of that monarchy and the rightful occupant of the throne could not be resolved. Consequently, the Third Republic, originally envisioned as a provisional government, instead became the permanent form of government of France.

The French constitutional laws of 1875 defined the composition of the Third Republic. It consisted of a Chamber of Deputies and a Senate to form the legislative branch of government and a president to serve as head of state. Calls for the re-establishment of the monarchy dominated the tenures of the first two presidents, Adolphe Thiers and Patrice de MacMahon. However, growing support for the republican form of government among the French populace and a series of republican presidents in the 1880s gradually quashed prospects of a restoration with the republic being seen as, in the words of Thiers, "the form of government that divides us the least".

The Third Republic established many French colonial possessions, including French Indochina, French Madagascar, French Polynesia, and large territories in West Africa during the Scramble for Africa, all of them acquired during the last two decades of the 19th century. The early years of the 20th century were dominated by the Democratic Republican Alliance, which was originally conceived as a centre-left political alliance, but over time became the main centre-right party. The period from the start of World War I to the late 1930s featured sharply polarized politics, between the Democratic Republican Alliance and the Radicals. The government fell less than a year after the outbreak of World War II, when Nazi forces occupied much of France, and was replaced by the rival governments of Charles de Gaulle's Free France (La France libre) and Philippe Pétain's French State (L'État français).

During the 19th and 20th centuries, the French colonial empire was the second largest colonial empire in the world only behind the British Empire; it extended over 13,500,000 km^{2} (5,200,000 sq mi) of land at its height in the 1920s and 1930s. Journalist Raymond Recouly wrote in 1931 that of all the Powers in Europe, only France could offer both a substantial metropolitan and colonial military career. In terms of population however, on the eve of World War II, France and its colonial possessions totaled only 150 million inhabitants, compared with 330 million for British India alone.

Adolphe Thiers called republicanism in the 1870s "the form of government that divides France least"; however, politics under the Third Republic were sharply polarized. On the left stood reformist France, heir to the French Revolution. On the right stood conservative France, rooted in the peasantry, the Catholic Church, and the army. In spite of France's sharply divided electorate and persistent attempts to overthrow it, the Third Republic endured for 70 years, which makes it the longest-lasting system of government in France since the collapse of the Ancien Régime in 1789.

== Origins and formation ==
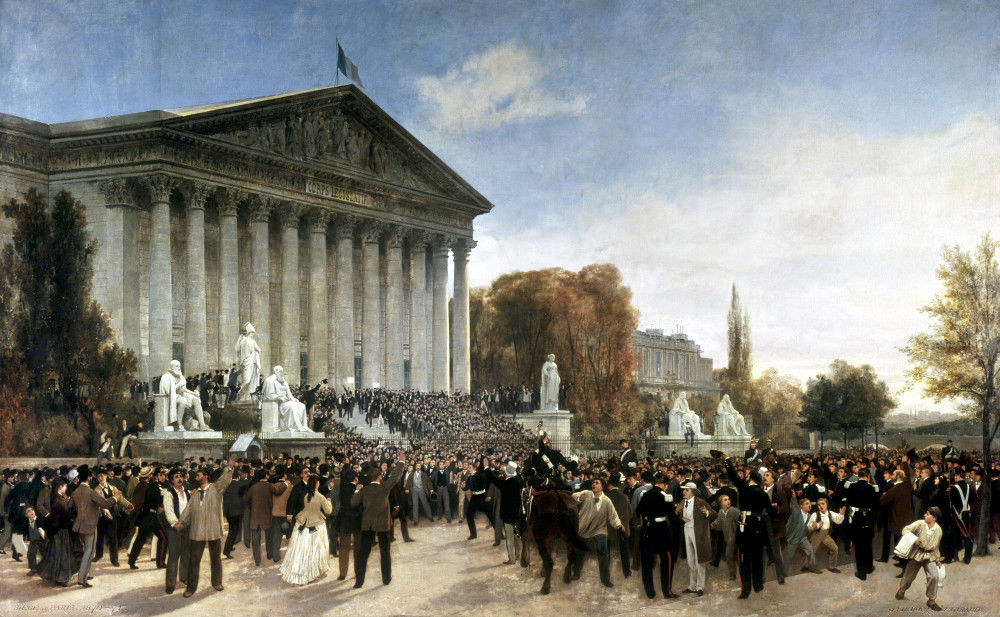
Proclamation of the abolition of the monarchy in front of the Palais Bourbon, seat of the Corps Législatif, on 4 September 1870

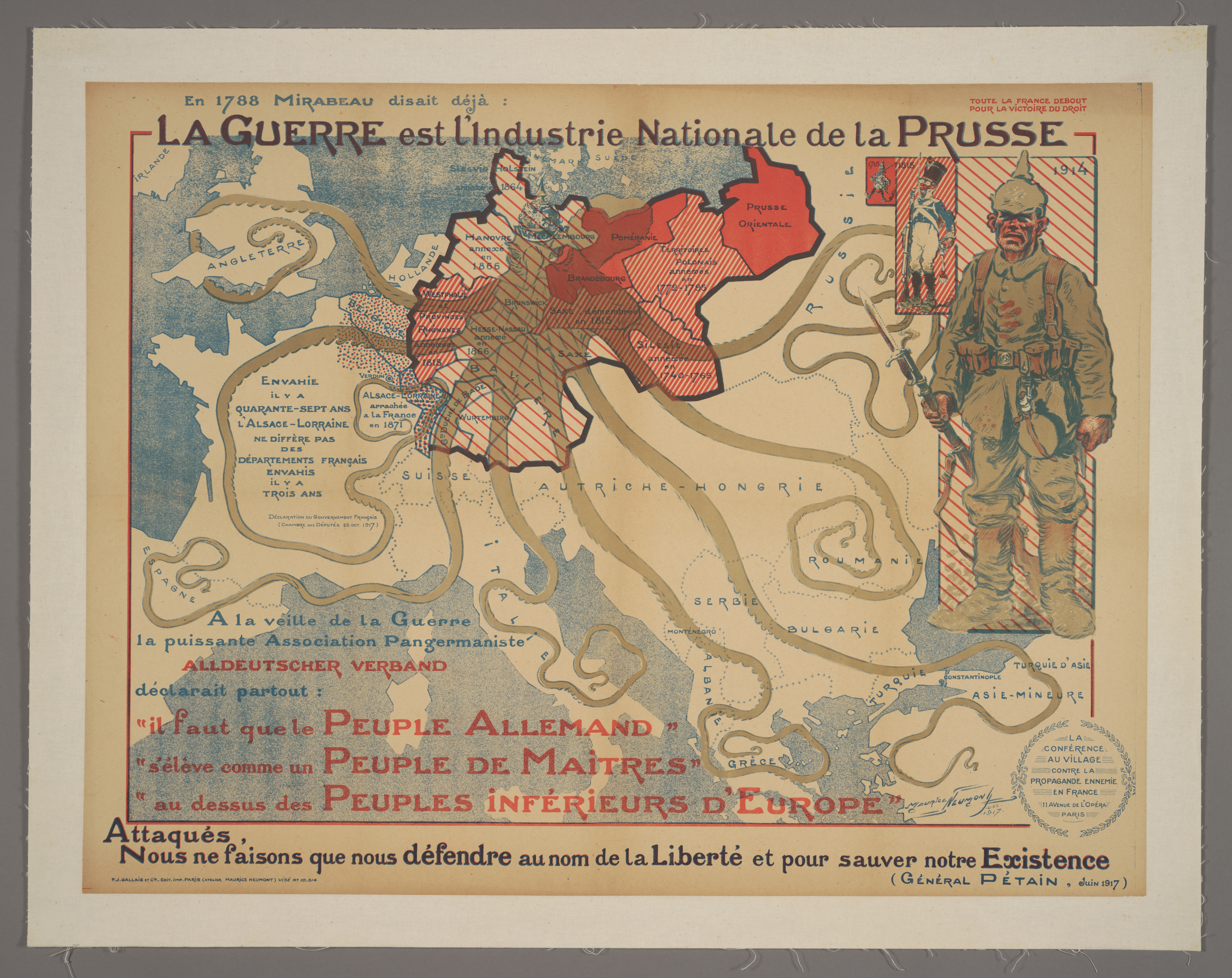
A French propaganda poster from 1917 is captioned with an 18th-century quote: "Even in 1788, Mirabeau was saying that War is the National Industry of Prussia."

The Franco-Prussian War of 1870–1871 resulted in the defeat of France and the overthrow of Emperor Napoleon III and his Second French Empire. After Napoleon's capture by the Prussians at the Battle of Sedan (1 September 1870), Parisian deputies led by Léon Gambetta established the Government of National Defence as a provisional government on 4 September 1870. The deputies then selected General Louis-Jules Trochu to serve as its president. This first government of the Third Republic ruled during the Siege of Paris (19 September 1870 – 28 January 1871). As Paris was cut off from the rest of unoccupied France, the Minister of War Léon Gambetta succeeded in leaving Paris in a hot air balloon, and established the provisional republican government in the city of Tours on the Loire river.

After the French surrender in January 1871, the provisional Government of National Defence disbanded, and national elections were called to elect a new French government. French territories occupied by Prussia at the time did not participate. The resulting conservative National Assembly elected Adolphe Thiers head of a provisional government, ("head of the executive branch of the Republic pending a decision on the institutions of France"). The new government negotiated a peace settlement with the newly proclaimed German Empire: the Treaty of Frankfurt signed on 10 May 1871. To prompt the Prussians to leave France, the government passed a variety of financial laws, such as the controversial Law of Maturities, to pay reparations.

In Paris, resentment built against the government from late March through May 1871. Paris workers and National Guards revolted and took power as the Paris Commune, which maintained a radical left-wing regime for two months until the Third government bloodily suppressed it in May 1871. The ensuing repression of the communards had disastrous consequences for the labour movement.

=== Attempts to restore the monarchy ===
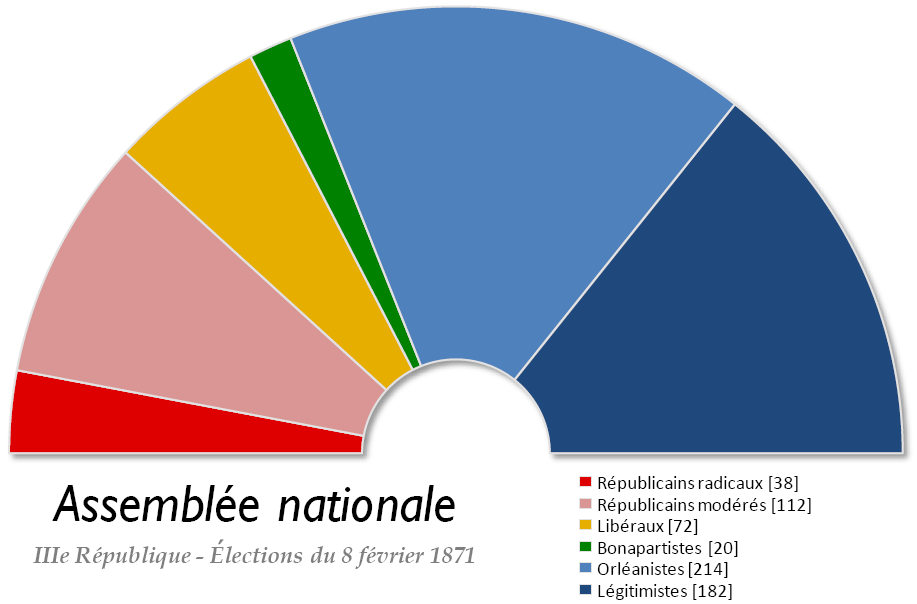
Composition of the national Assembly – 1871

The French legislative election of 1871, held in the aftermath when the regime of Napoleon III collapsed, resulted in a monarchist majority in the French National Assembly that favoured a peace agreement with Prussia. Planning to restore the monarchy, the "Legitimists" in the National Assembly supported the candidacy of Henri, Comte de Chambord, alias "Henry V", grandson of King Charles X, the last king from the senior line of the Bourbon dynasty. The Orléanists supported Louis-Philippe, Comte de Paris, a grandson of King Louis Philippe I, who replaced his cousin Charles X in 1830. The Bonapartists lost legitimacy due to the defeat of Napoléon III and were unable to advance the candidacy of any member of the Bonaparte family.

Legitimists and Orléanists eventually agreed on the childless Comte de Chambord as king, with the Comte de Paris as his heir. This was the expected line of succession for the Comte de Chambord based on France's traditional rule of agnatic primogeniture if the renunciation of the Spanish Bourbons in the Peace of Utrecht was recognised. Consequently, in 1871 the throne was offered to the Comte de Chambord.

=== Monarchists' republic and constitutional crisis ===
Chambord believed the restored monarchy had to eliminate all traces of the Revolution (most famously including the tricolore), to restore unity between the monarchy and the nation. Compromise on this was impossible, Chambord believed, if the nation were to be made whole again. The general population, however, was unwilling to abandon the Tricolour flag. Monarchists therefore resigned themselves to delay the monarchy until the death of the ageing, childless Chambord, then to offer the throne to his more liberal heir, the Comte de Paris. A "temporary" republican government was therefore established. Chambord lived on until 1883, but by that time, enthusiasm for a monarchy had faded, and the Comte de Paris was never offered the French throne.

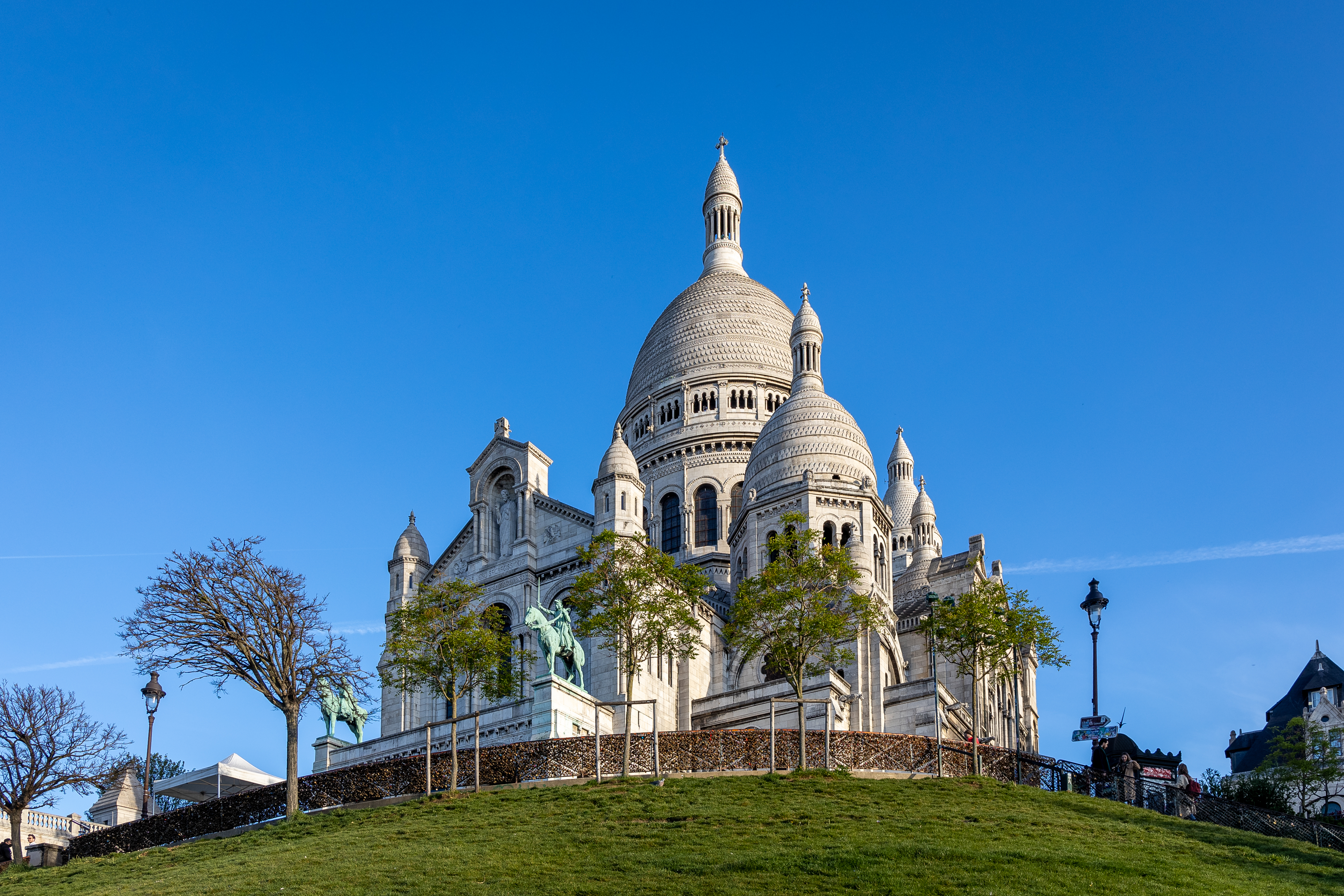
The Sacré-Cœur Basilica was built as a symbol of the Ordre Moral.

Following the French surrender to Prussia in January 1871, concluding the Franco-Prussian War, the transitional Government of National Defence established a new seat of government at Versailles due to the encirclement of Paris by Prussian forces. New representatives were elected in February of that year, constituting the government which would come to evolve into the Third Republic. These representatives – predominantly conservative republicans – enacted a series of legislation which prompted resistance and outcry from radical and leftist elements of the republican movement. In Paris, a series of public altercations broke out between the Versailles-aligned Parisian government and the city's radical socialists. The radicals ultimately rejected the authority of Versailles, responding with the foundation of the Paris Commune in March.

The principles underpinning the Commune were viewed as morally degenerate by French conservatives at large while the government at Versailles sought to maintain the tenuous post-war stability which it had established. In May, the regular French Armed Forces, under the command of Patrice de MacMahon and the Versailles government, marched on Paris and succeeded in dismantling the Commune during what would become known as The Bloody Week. The term ordre moral ("moral order") subsequently came to be applied to the budding Third Republic due to the perceived restoration of conservative policies and values following the suppression of the Commune.

De MacMahon, his popularity bolstered by his victory over the Commune, was later elected President of the Republic in May 1873 and would hold the office until January 1879. A staunch Catholic conservative with Legitimist sympathies and a noted mistrust of secularists, de MacMahon grew to be increasingly at odds with the French parliament as liberal and secular republicans gained a legislative majority during his presidency.

In February 1875, a series of parliamentary acts established the constitutional laws of the new republic. At its head was a President of the Republic. A two-chamber parliament consisting of a directly elected Chamber of Deputies and an indirectly elected Senate was created, along with a ministry under the President of the council (prime minister), who was nominally answerable to both the President of the Republic and the legislature. Throughout the 1870s, the issue of whether a monarchy should replace or oversee the republic dominated public debate.

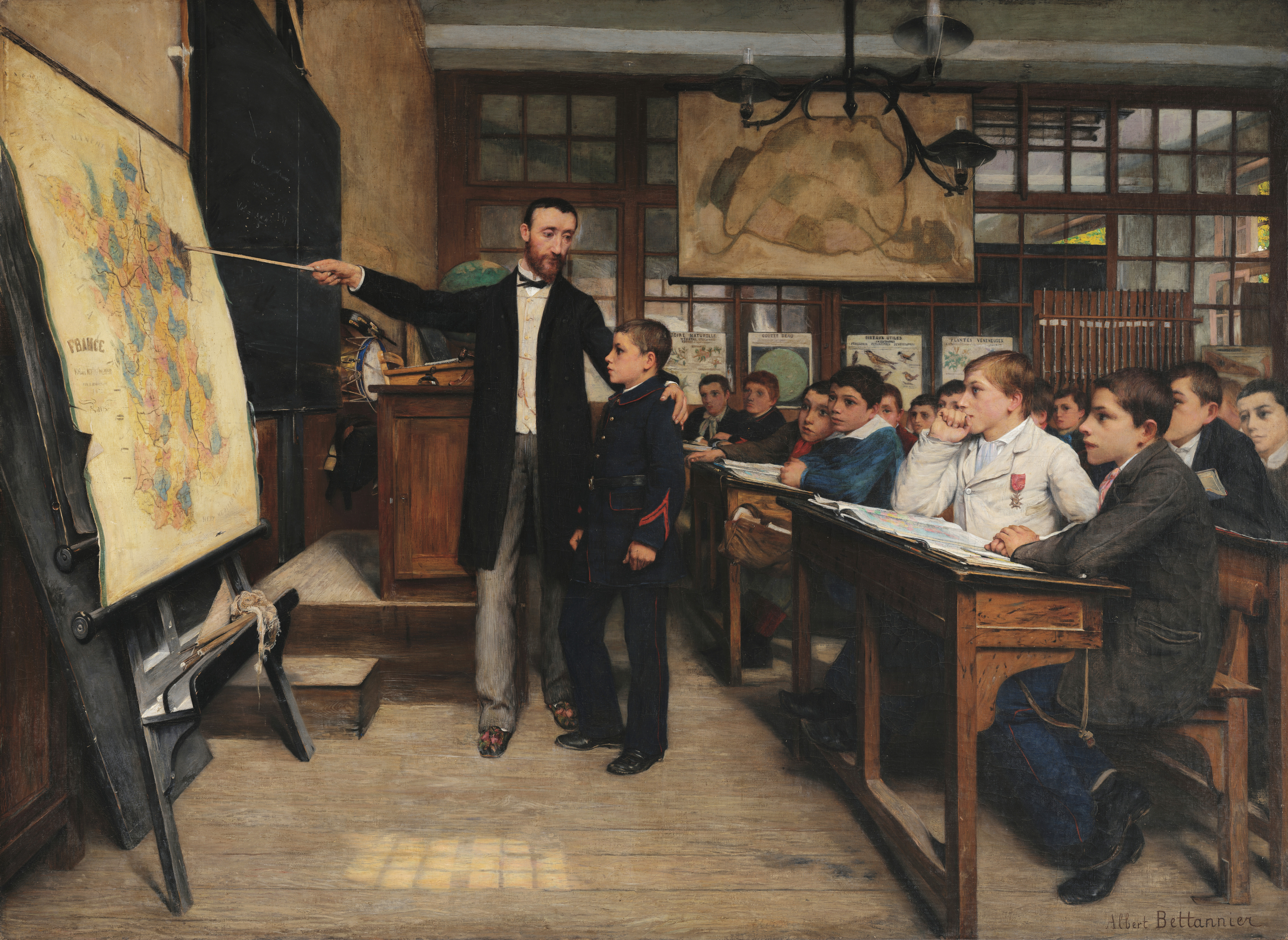
In France from 1871 to the end of World War I in 1918, schoolchildren were taught not to forget the lost regions of Alsace–Lorraine, which were coloured in black on maps.

The elections of 1876 demonstrated strong public support for the increasingly anti-monarchist republican movement. A decisive Republican majority was elected to the Chamber of Deputies while the monarchist majority in the Senate was maintained by only one seat. President de MacMahon responded in May 1877, attempting to quell the Republicans' rising popularity and limit their political influence through a series of actions known as le seize Mai.

On 16 May 1877, de MacMahon forced the resignation of Moderate Republican prime minister Jules Simon and appointed the Orléanist Albert de Broglie to the office. The Chamber of Deputies declared the appointment illegitimate, exceeding the president's powers, and refused to cooperate with either de MacMahon or de Broglie. De MacMahon then dissolved the Chamber and called for a new general election to be held the following October. He was subsequently accused by Republicans and their sympathizers of attempting a constitutional coup d'état, which he denied.

The October elections again brought a Republican majority to the Chamber of Deputies, reiterating public opinion. The Republicans would go on to gain a majority in the Senate by January 1879, establishing dominance in both houses and effectively ending the potential for a monarchist restoration. De MacMahon himself resigned on 30 January 1879 to be succeeded by the moderate Republican Jules Grévy. He promised that he would not use his presidential power of dissolution, and therefore lost his control over the legislature, effectively creating a parliamentary system that would be maintained until the end of the Third Republic.

=== Republicans take power ===
Following the 16 May crisis in 1877, Legitimists were pushed out of power, and the Republic was finally governed by Moderate Republicans (pejoratively labelled "Opportunist Republicans" by Radical Republicans) who supported moderate social and political changes to nurture the new regime, such as a purge of the civil service. The Jules Ferry laws making public education free, mandatory, and secular (laїque), were voted in 1881 and 1882, one of the first signs of the expanding civic powers of the Republic. From that time onward, the Catholic clergy lost control of public education.

To discourage the monarchists, the French Crown Jewels were broken up and sold in 1885. Only a few crowns were kept, their precious gems replaced by coloured glass.

== Politics during the Belle Époque ==
=== Boulanger crisis ===
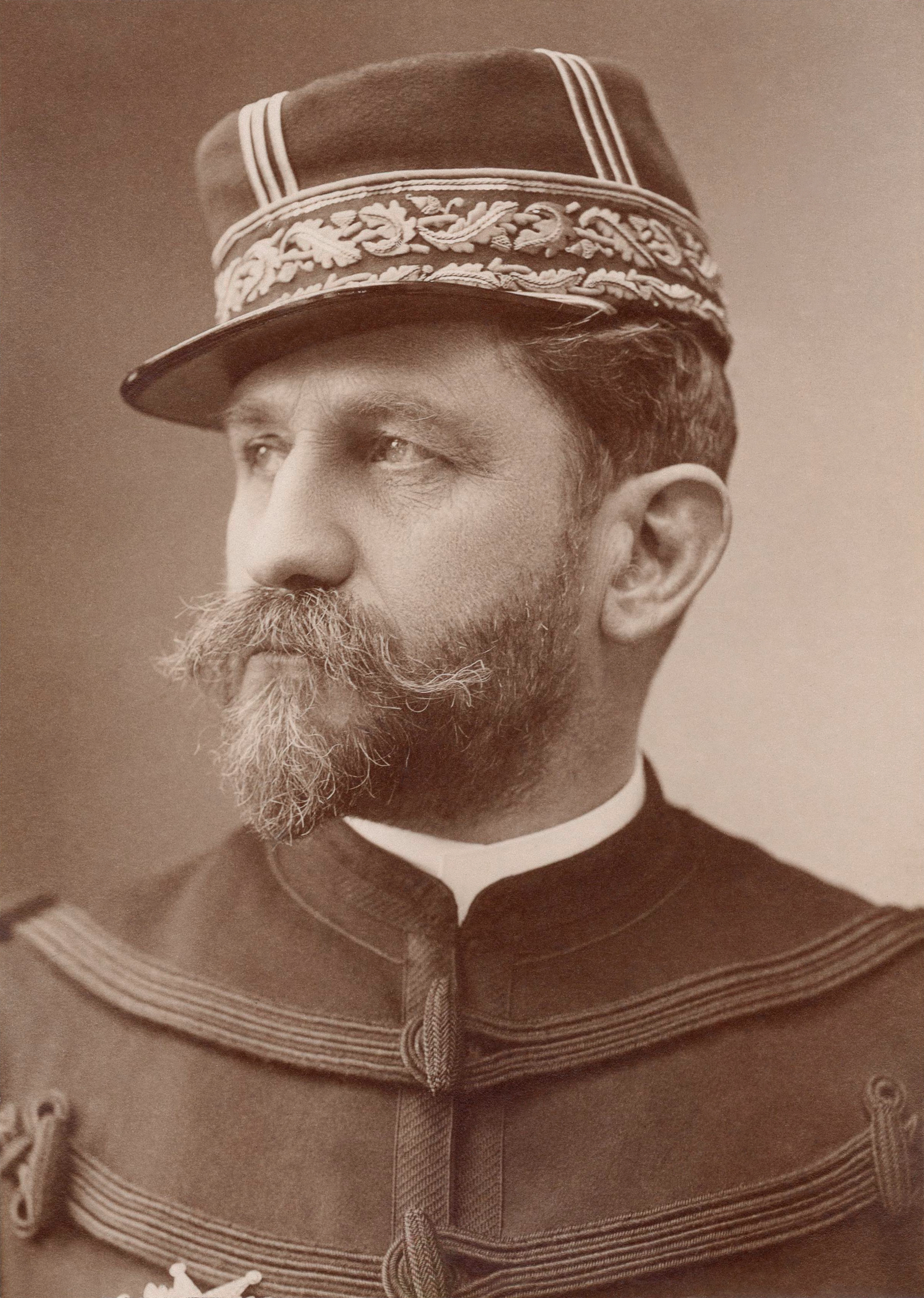
Georges Ernest Boulanger, nicknamed Général Revanche

In 1889, the Republic was rocked by a sudden political crisis precipitated by General Georges Boulanger. An enormously popular general, he won a series of elections in which he would resign his seat in the Chamber of Deputies and run again in another district. At the apogee of his popularity in January 1889, he posed the threat of a coup d'état and the establishment of a dictatorship. With his base of support in the working districts of Paris and other cities, plus rural traditionalist Catholics and royalists, he promoted an aggressive nationalism aimed against Germany. The elections of September 1889 marked a decisive defeat for the Boulangists. They were defeated by the changes in the electoral laws that prevented Boulanger from running in multiple constituencies; by the government's aggressive opposition; and by the absence of the general himself, in self-imposed exile with his mistress. The fall of Boulanger severely undermined the conservative and royalist elements within France; they would not recover until 1940.

Revisionist scholars have argued that the Boulangist movement more often represented elements of the radical left rather than the extreme right. Their work is part of an emerging consensus that France's radical right was formed in part during the Dreyfus era by men who had been Boulangist partisans of the radical left a decade earlier.

=== Panama scandal ===
The Panama scandals of 1892, regarded as the largest financial fraud of the 19th century, involved a failed attempt to build the Panama Canal. Plagued by disease, death, inefficiency, and widespread corruption, and its troubles covered up by bribed French officials, the Panama Canal Company went bankrupt. Its stock became worthless, and ordinary investors lost close to a billion francs.

=== Welfare state and public health ===
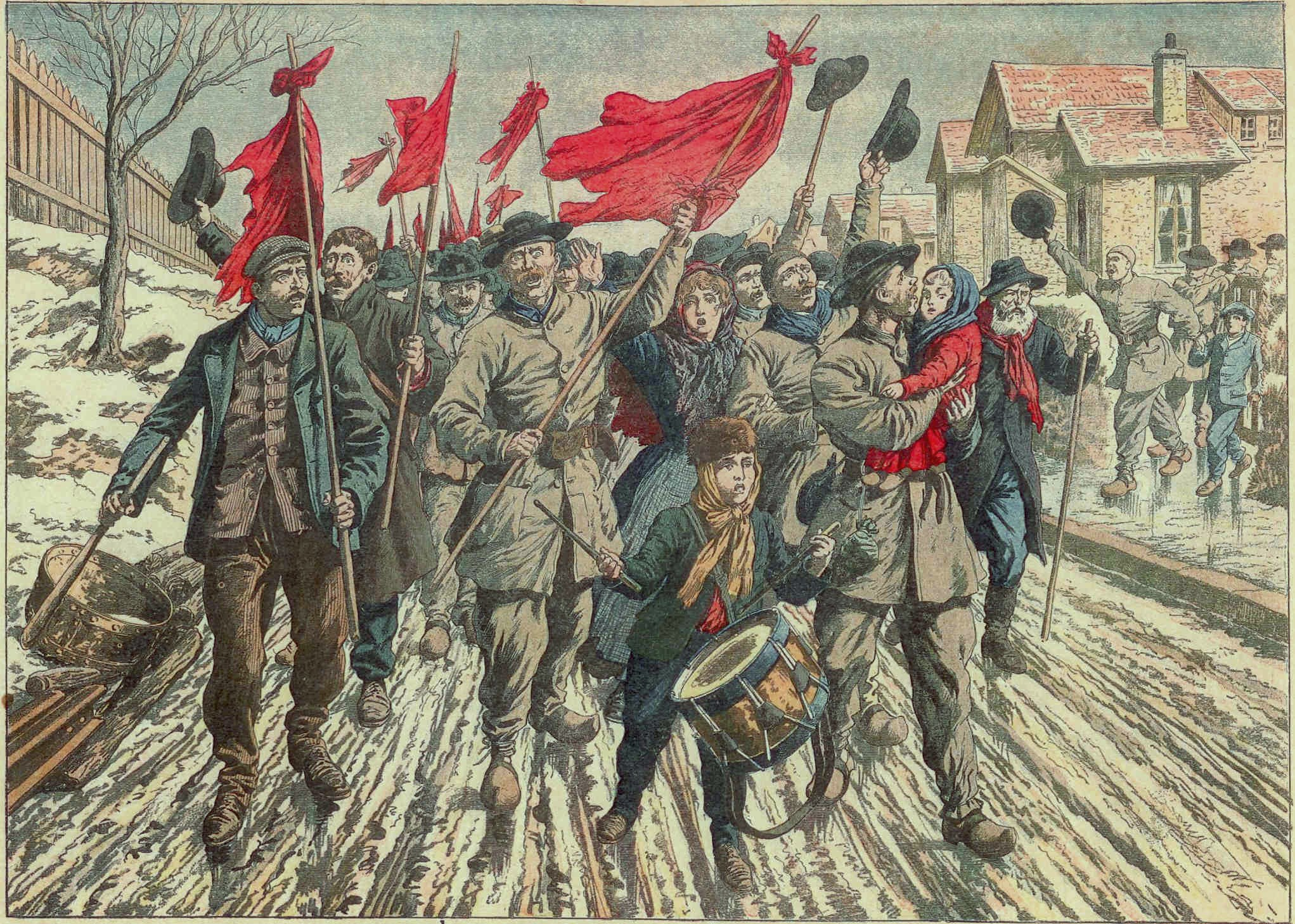
Front page of Le Petit Journal (1906) depicting striking miners in Pas-de-Calais following the Courrières mine disaster

France lagged behind Bismarckian Germany, as well as Great Britain and Ireland, in developing a welfare state with public health, unemployment insurance and national old age pension plans. There was an accident insurance law for workers in 1898, and in 1910, France created a national pension plan. Unlike Germany or Britain, the programs were much smaller – for example, pensions were a voluntary plan. Historian Timothy Smith finds French fears of national public assistance programs were grounded in a widespread disdain for the English Poor Law.

Tuberculosis was the most dreaded disease of the day, especially striking young people in their twenties. Germany set up vigorous measures of public hygiene and public sanatoria, but France let private physicians handle the problem. The French medical profession guarded its prerogatives, and public health activists were not as well organized or as influential as in Germany, Britain or the United States. For example, there was a long battle over a public health law which began in the 1880s as a campaign to reorganize the nation's health services, to require the registration of infectious diseases, to mandate quarantines, and to improve the deficient health and housing legislation of 1850. However, the reformers met opposition from bureaucrats, politicians, and physicians. Because it was so threatening to so many interests, the proposal was debated and postponed for 20 years before becoming law in 1902. Implementation finally came when the government realized that contagious diseases had a national security impact in weakening military recruits, and keeping the population growth rate well below Germany's. There is no evidence to suggest that French life expectancy was lower than that of Germany.

=== Radicals' republic ===
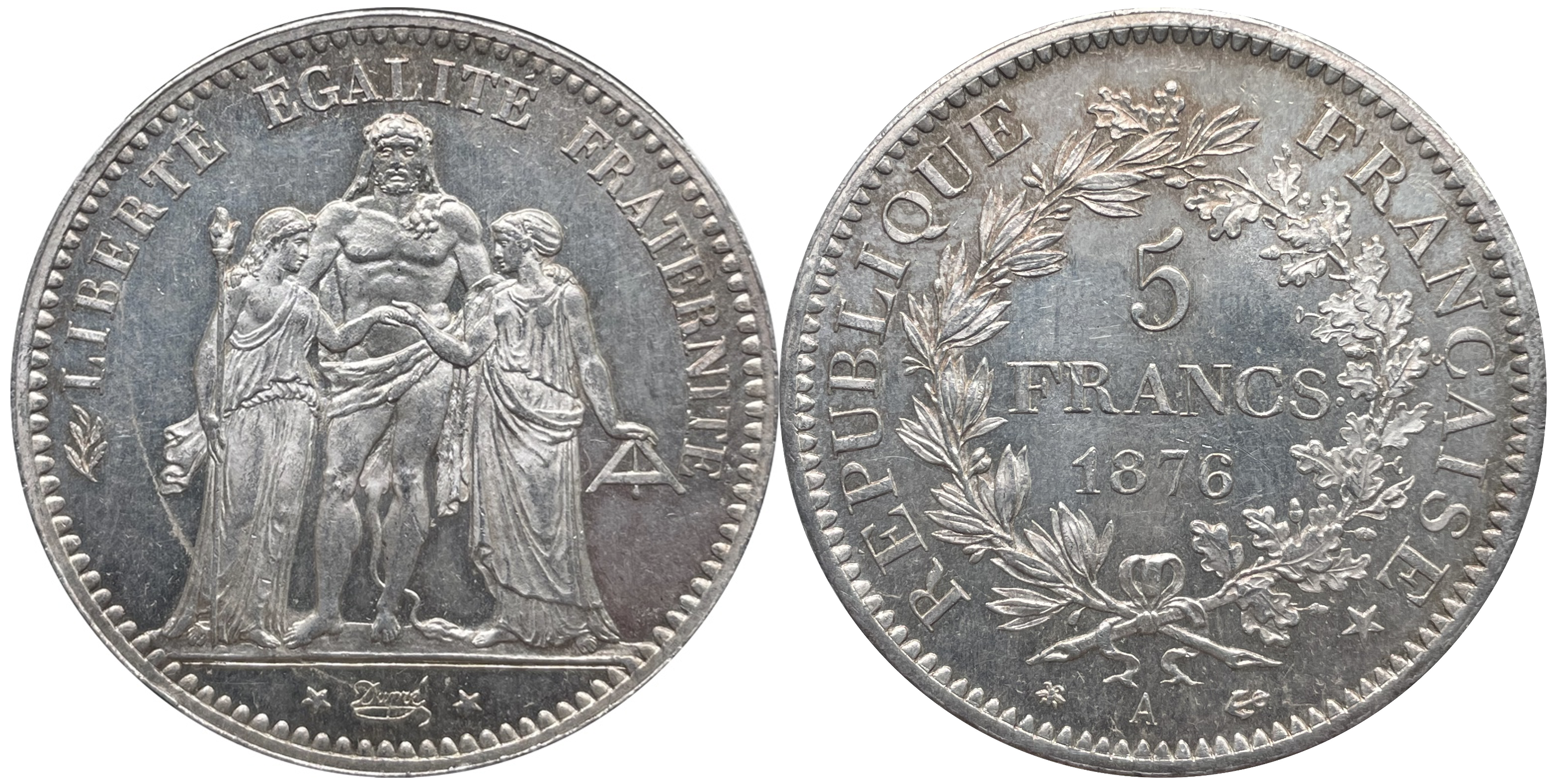
Silver coin: 5 francs of France 1876, released under President Patrice de Mac Mahon

The most important party of the early 20th century in France was the Radical Party, founded in 1901 as the "Republican, Radical and Radical-Socialist Party" ("Parti républicain, radical et radical-socialiste"). It was classically liberal in political orientation and opposed the monarchists and clerical elements on the one hand, and the Socialists on the other. Many members had been recruited by the Freemasons. The Radicals were split between activists who called for state intervention to achieve economic and social equality and conservatives whose first priority was stability. The workers' demands for strikes threatened such stability and pushed many Radicals toward conservatism. It opposed women's suffrage for fear that women would vote for its opponents or for candidates endorsed by the Catholic Church. It favoured a progressive income tax, economic equality, expanded educational opportunities and cooperatives in domestic policy. In foreign policy, it favoured a strong League of Nations after the war, and the maintenance of peace through compulsory arbitration, controlled disarmament, economic sanctions, and perhaps an international military force.

Followers of Léon Gambetta, such as Raymond Poincaré, who would become President of the Council in the 1920s, created the Democratic Republican Alliance (ARD), which became the main center-right party after World War I.

Governing coalitions collapsed with regularity, rarely lasting more than a few months, as radicals, socialists, liberals, conservatives, republicans and monarchists all fought for control. Some historians argue that the collapses were not important because they reflected minor changes in coalitions of many parties that routinely lost and gained a few allies. Consequently, the change of governments could be seen as little more than a series of ministerial reshuffles, with many individuals carrying forward from one government to the next, often in the same posts.

=== Dreyfus affair ===
The Dreyfus affair was a major political scandal that convulsed France from 1894 until its resolution in 1906, and then had reverberations for decades more. The conduct of the affair has become a modern and universal symbol of injustice. It remains one of the most striking examples of a complex miscarriage of justice in which a central role was played by the press and public opinion. At issue was blatant antisemitism as practised by the French Army and defended by conservatives and Catholic traditionalists against secular centre-left, left and republican forces, including most Jews. In the end, the latter triumphed.

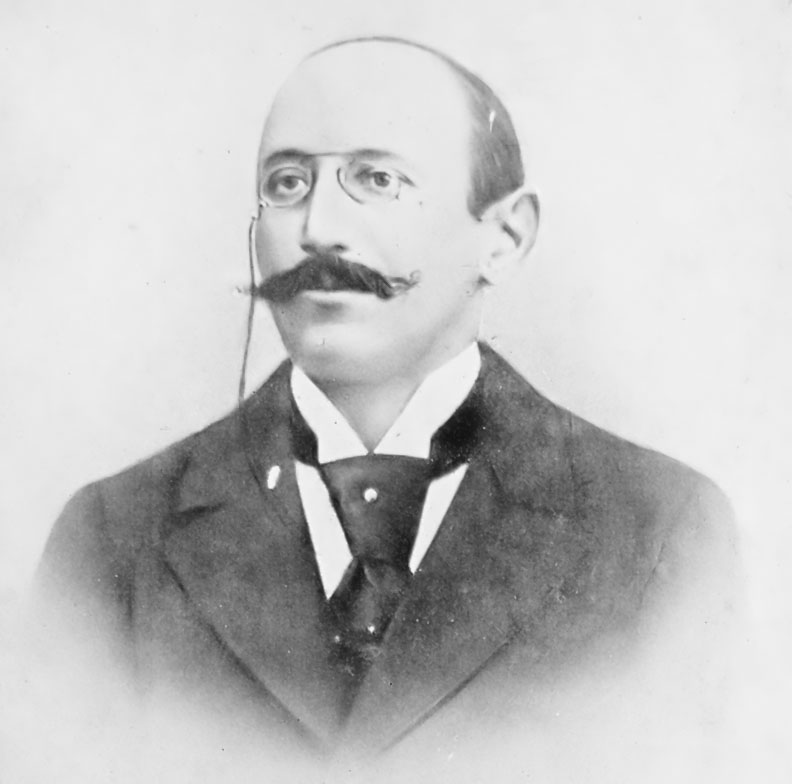
Capt. Alfred Dreyfus

The affair began in November 1894 with the conviction for treason of Captain Alfred Dreyfus, a young French artillery officer of Alsatian Jewish descent. He was sentenced to life imprisonment for communicating French military secrets to the German Embassy in Paris and sent to the penal colony at Devil's Island in French Guiana (nicknamed la guillotine sèche, the dry guillotine), where he spent almost five years.

Two years later, evidence came to light that identified a French Army major named Ferdinand Walsin Esterhazy as the real spy. After high-ranking military officials suppressed the new evidence, a military court unanimously acquitted Esterhazy. In response, the Army brought up additional charges against Dreyfus based on false documents. Word of the military court's attempts to frame Dreyfus began to spread, chiefly owing to the polemic J'accuse, a vehement open letter published on the liberal newspaper L'Aurore in January 1898 by the notable writer Émile Zola. Activists put pressure on the government to re-open the case.

In 1899, Dreyfus was returned to France for another trial. The intense political and judicial scandal that ensued divided French society between those who supported Dreyfus (now called "Dreyfusards"), such as Anatole France, Henri Poincaré and Georges Clemenceau, and those who condemned him (the anti-Dreyfusards), such as Édouard Drumont, the director and publisher of the antisemitic newspaper La Libre Parole. The new trial resulted in another conviction and a 10-year sentence, but Dreyfus was given a pardon and set free. Eventually all the accusations against him were demonstrated to be baseless, and in 1906, Dreyfus was exonerated and re-instated as a major in the French Army.

From 1894 to 1906, the scandal divided France deeply and lastingly into two opposing camps: the pro-Army "anti-Dreyfusards" composed of conservatives, Catholic traditionalists and monarchists who generally lost the initiative to the anti-clerical, pro-republican "Dreyfusards", with strong support from intellectuals and teachers. It embittered French politics and facilitated the increasing influence of radical politicians on both sides of the political spectrum.

== Social history ==
Bal du moulin de la Galette, by Auguste Renoir, 1876

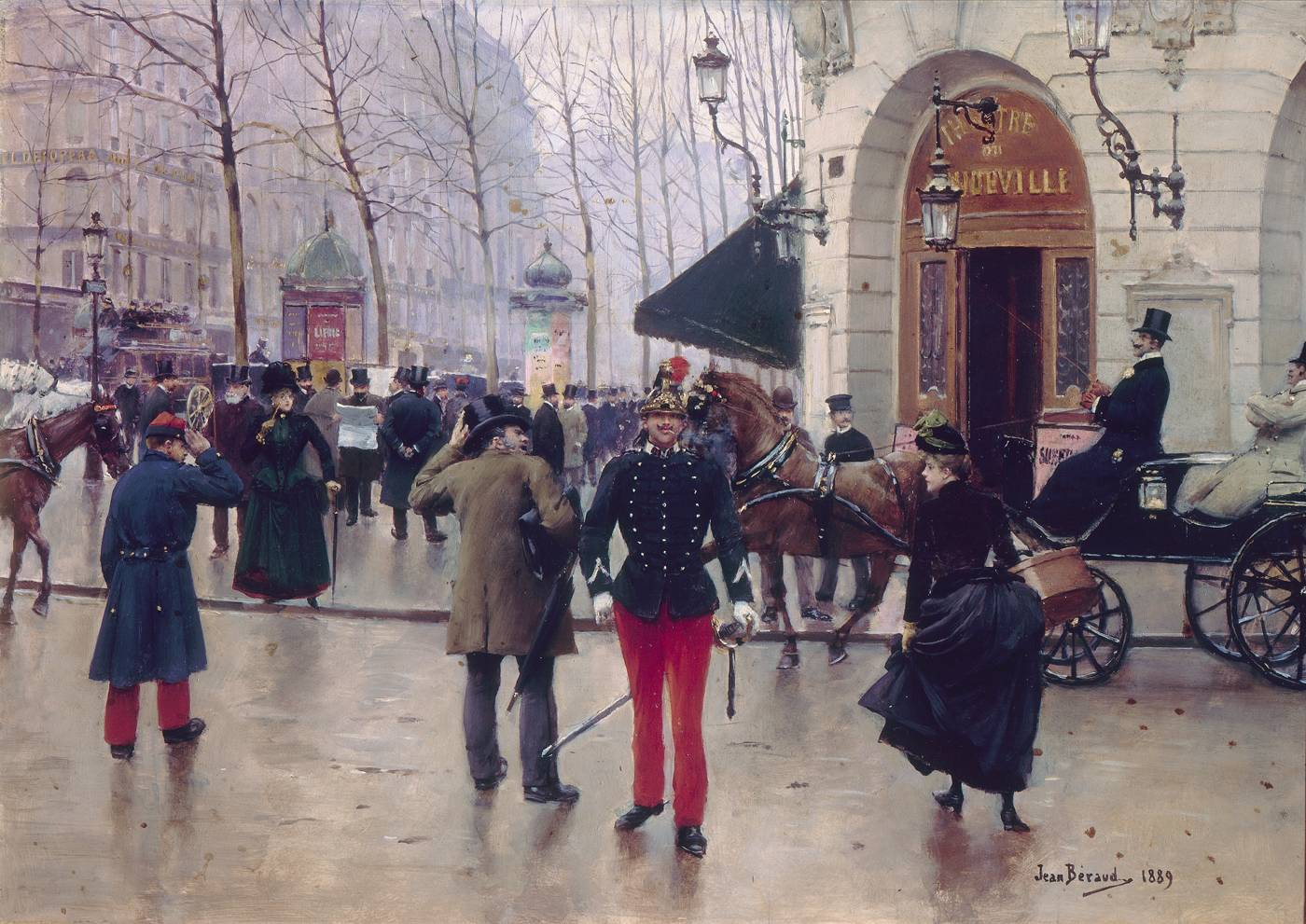
Le boulevard des Capucines et le théâtre du Vaudeville, by Jean Béraud, 1889

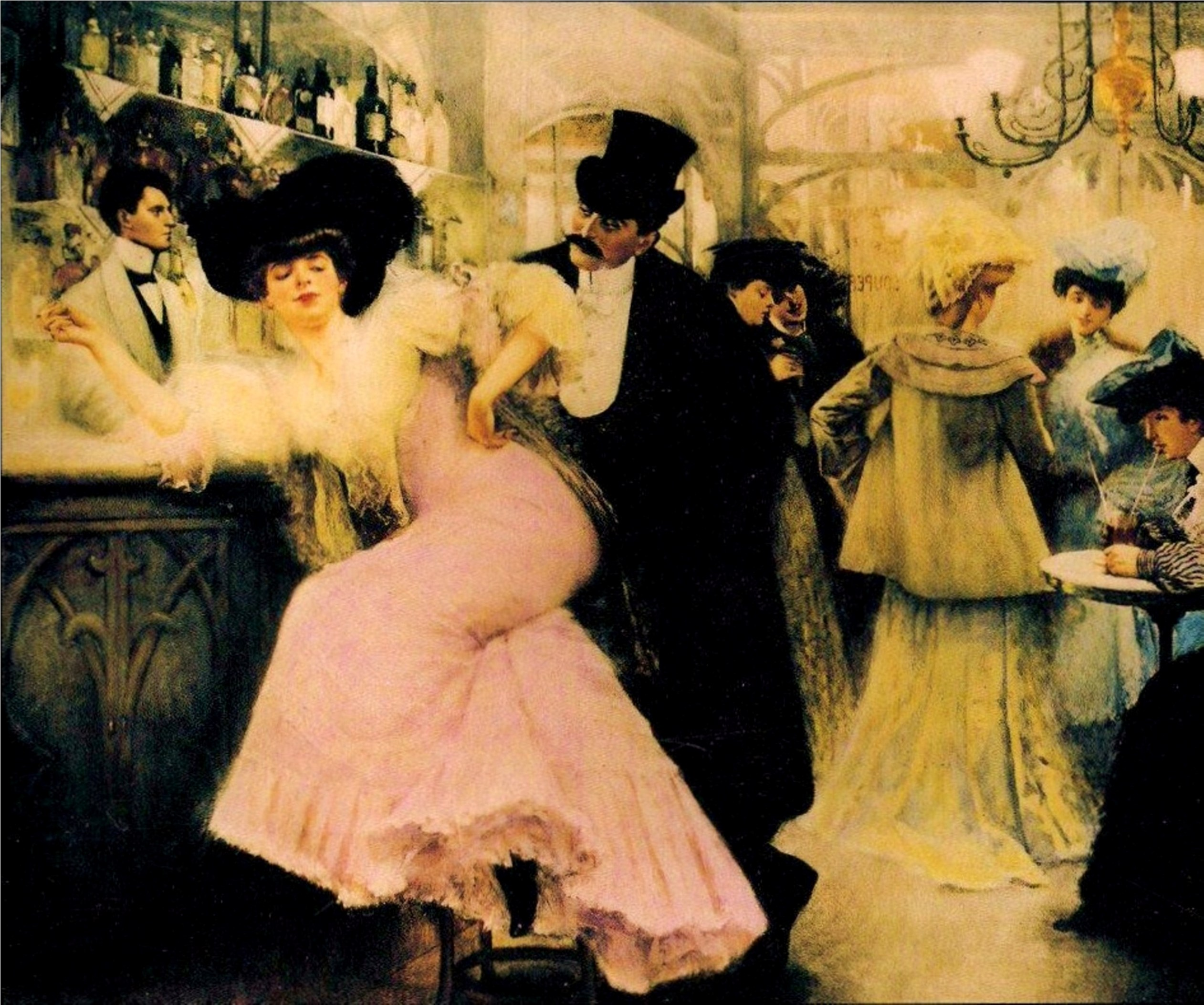
The Belle Époque, The Bar at Maxim's, by Pierre-Victor Galland, c. 1890

=== Newspapers ===
The democratic political structure was supported by the proliferation of politicized newspapers. The circulation of the daily press in Paris went from 1 million in 1870 to 5 million in 1910; it later reached 6 million in 1939. Advertising grew rapidly, providing a steady financial basis for publishing, but it did not cover all of the costs involved and had to be supplemented by secret subsidies from commercial interests that wanted favourable reporting. A new liberal press law of 1881 abandoned the restrictive practices that had been typical for a century. High-speed rotary Hoe presses, introduced in the 1860s, facilitated quick turnaround time and cheaper publication. New types of popular newspapers, especially Le Petit Journal, reached an audience more interested in diverse entertainment and gossip than hard news. It captured a quarter of the Parisian market and forced the rest to lower their prices. The main dailies employed their own journalists who competed for news flashes. All newspapers relied upon the Agence Havas (now Agence France-Presse), a telegraphic news service with a network of reporters and contracts with Reuters to provide world service. The staid old papers retained their loyal clientele because of their concentration on serious political issues. While papers usually gave false circulation figures, Le Petit Provençal in 1913 probably had a daily circulation of about 100,000 and Le Petit Méridional had about 70,000. Advertising only filled 20% or so of the pages.

The Roman Catholic Assumptionist order revolutionized pressure group media by its national newspaper La Croix. It vigorously advocated for traditional Catholicism while at the same time innovating with the most modern technology and distribution systems, with regional editions tailored to local taste. Secularists and Republicans recognized the newspaper as their greatest enemy, especially when it took the lead in attacking Dreyfus as a traitor and stirring up antisemitism. After Dreyfus was pardoned, the Radical government closed down the entire Assumptionist order and its newspaper in 1900.

Banks secretly paid certain newspapers to promote particular financial interests and hide or cover up misbehaviour. They also took payments for favourable notices in news articles of commercial products. Sometimes, a newspaper would blackmail a business by threatening to publish unfavorable information unless the business immediately started advertising in the paper. Foreign governments, especially Russia and the Ottomans, secretly paid the press hundreds of thousands of francs a year to guarantee favourable coverage of the bonds they were selling in Paris. When the real news was bad about Russia, as during its 1905 Revolution or during its war with Japan, it raised the ante to millions. During the World War, newspapers became more of a propaganda agency on behalf of the war effort and avoided critical commentary. They seldom reported the achievements of the Allies, crediting all the good news to the French army. In a sentence, the newspapers were not independent champions of the truth, but secretly paid advertisements for banking.

The World War ended a golden era for the press. Their younger staff members were drafted, and male replacements could not be found (female journalists were not considered suitable). Rail transportation was rationed and less paper and ink came in, and fewer copies could be shipped out. Inflation raised the price of newsprint, which was always in short supply. The cover price went up, circulation fell and many of the 242 dailies published outside Paris closed down. The government set up the Interministerial Press Commission to supervise the press closely. A separate agency imposed tight censorship that led to blank spaces where news reports or editorials were disallowed. The dailies sometimes were limited to only two pages instead of the usual four, leading one satirical paper to try to report the war news in the same spirit:

War News. A half-zeppelin threw half its bombs on half-time combatants, resulting in one-quarter damaged. The zeppelin, halfways-attacked by a portion of half-anti aircraft guns, was half destroyed.

Regional newspapers flourished after 1900. However the Parisian newspapers were largely stagnant after the war. The major postwar success story was Paris-Soir, which lacked any political agenda and was dedicated to providing a mix of sensational reporting to aid circulation and serious articles to build prestige. By 1939, its circulation was over 1.7 million, double that of its nearest rival the tabloid Le Petit Parisien. In addition to its daily paper, Paris Soir sponsored a highly successful women's magazine Marie Claire. Another magazine, Match, was modelled on the photojournalism of the American magazine Life.

=== Modernization of the peasants ===
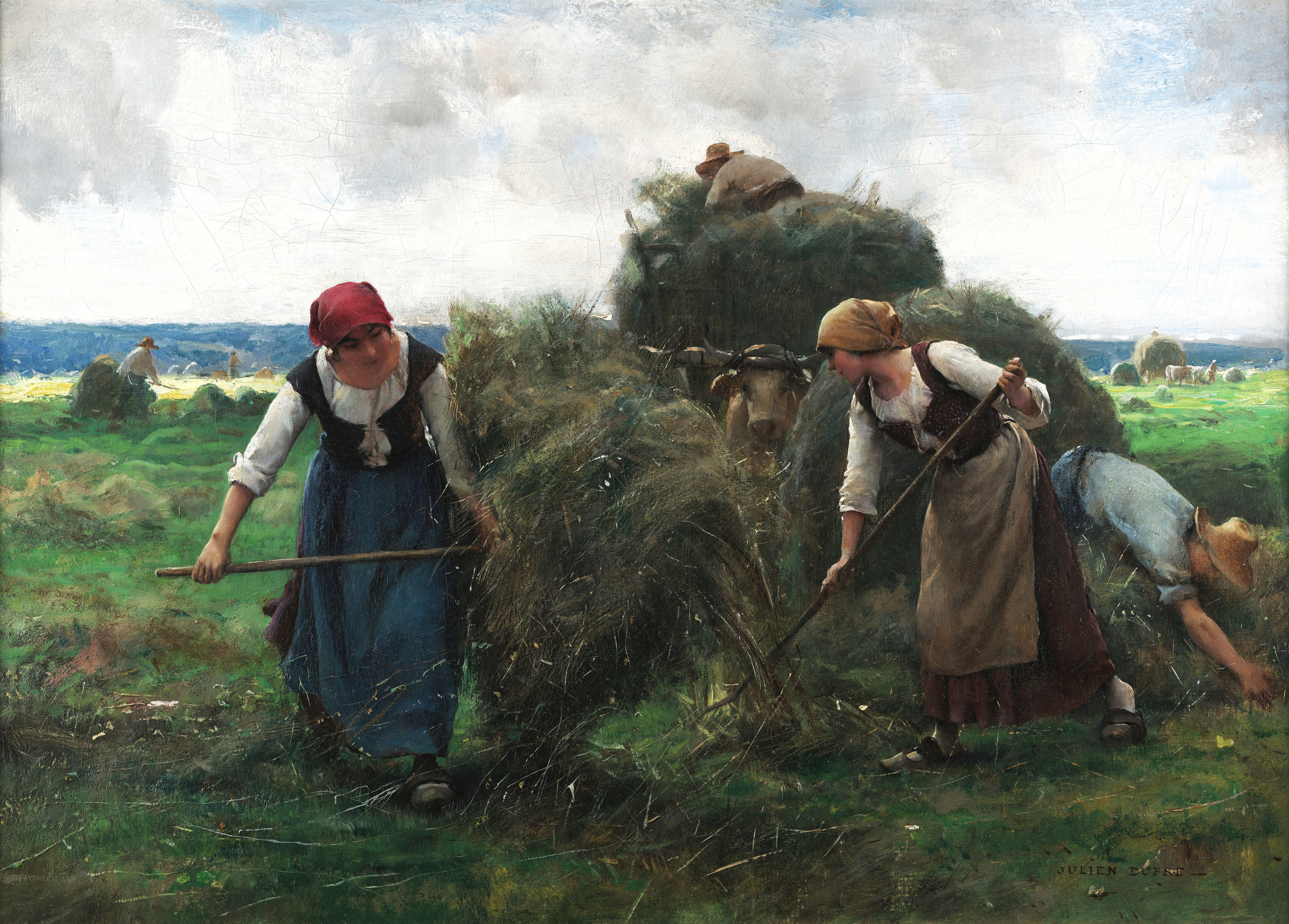
The Hay Harvesters, by Julien Dupré, c. 1880

France was a rural nation, and the peasant farmer was the typical French citizen. In his seminal book Peasants into Frenchmen (1976), historian Eugen Weber traced the modernization of French villages and argued that rural France went from backward and isolated to modern with a sense of national identity during the late 19th and early 20th centuries. He emphasized the roles of railroads, republican schools, and universal military conscription. He based his findings on school records, migration patterns, military service documents and economic trends. Weber argued that until 1900 or so a sense of French nationhood was weak in the provinces. Weber then looked at how the policies of the Third Republic created a sense of French nationality in rural areas. Weber's scholarship was widely praised, but was criticized by some who argued that a sense of Frenchness existed in the provinces before 1870.

=== City department store ===
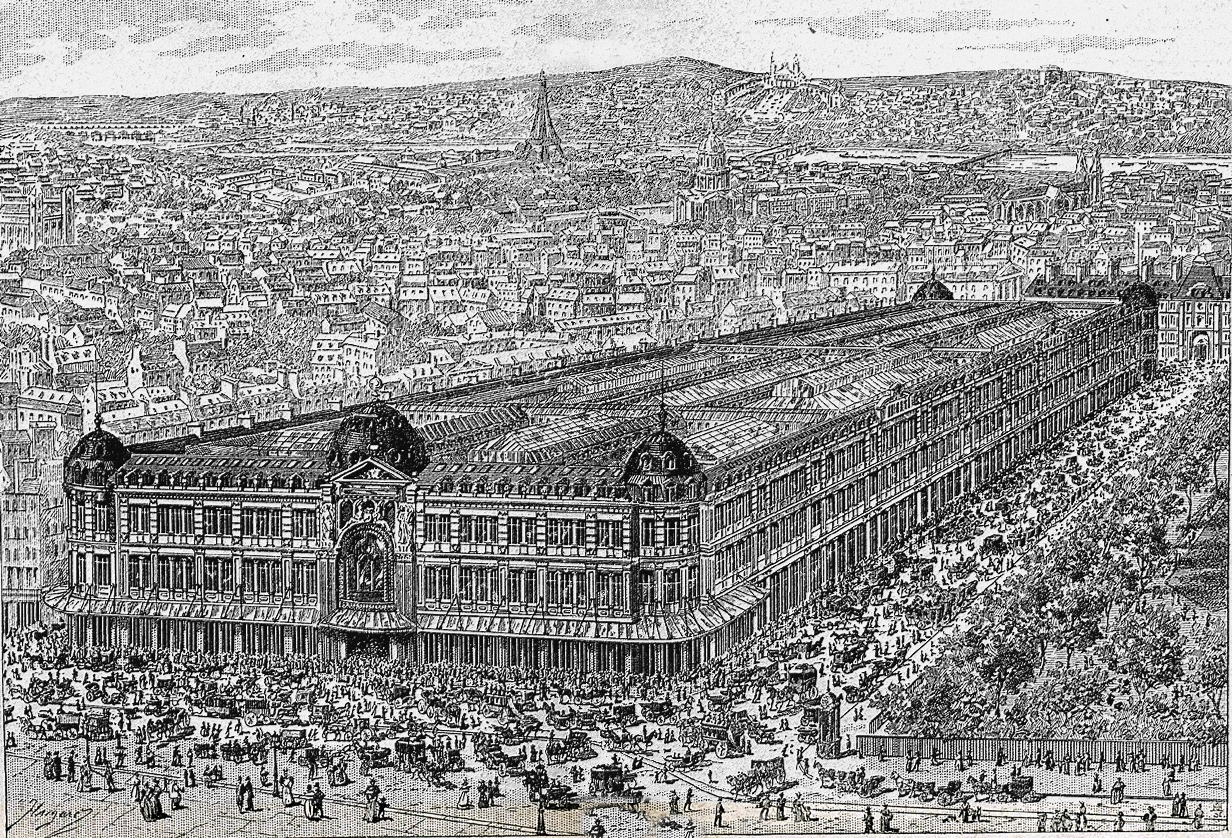
Au Bon Marché

Aristide Boucicaut founded Le Bon Marché in Paris in 1838, and by 1852 it offered a wide variety of goods in "departments inside one building". Goods were sold at fixed prices, with guarantees that allowed exchanges and refunds. By the end of the 19th century, Georges Dufayel, a French credit merchant, had served up to three million customers and was affiliated with La Samaritaine, a large French department store established in 1870 by a former Bon Marché executive.

The French gloried in the national prestige brought by the great Parisian stores. The great writer Émile Zola (1840–1902) set his novel Au Bonheur des Dames (1882–83) in the typical department store. Zola represented it as a symbol of the new technology that was both improving society and devouring it. The novel describes merchandising, management techniques, marketing, and consumerism.

The Grands Magasins Dufayel was a large department store with inexpensive prices, built in 1890 in the northern part of Paris, where it reached a large new customer base among the working class. In a neighbourhood with few public spaces, it provided a consumer version of the public square. It encouraged workers to approach shopping as an exciting social activity, not just a routine exercise in obtaining necessities, just as the bourgeoisie did at the famous department stores in the central city. Like the bourgeois stores, it helped transform consumption from a business transaction into a direct relationship between consumers and sought-after goods. Its advertisements promised the opportunity to participate in the newest, most fashionable forms of consumerism at reasonable cost. The latest technology was featured, such as cinemas and exhibits of inventions like X-ray machines (which could be used to fit shoes) and the gramophone.

Increasingly after 1870, the stores' work force became feminized, opening up job opportunities for young women. Despite the low pay and long hours, they enjoyed the interactions with the newest and most fashionable merchandise and upscale customers.

== Church and state ==
Throughout the lifetime of the Third Republic (1870–1940), there were battles over the status of the Catholic Church in France among the republicans, monarchists and the authoritarians (such as the Napoleonists). The French clergy and bishops were closely associated with the monarchists and many of its hierarchy were from noble families. Republicans were based in the anti-clerical middle class, who saw the Church's alliance with the monarchists as a political threat to republicanism, and a threat to the modern spirit of progress. The republicans detested the Church for its political and class affiliations; for them, the Church represented the Ancien Régime, a time in French history most republicans hoped was long behind them. The republicans were strengthened by Protestant and Jewish support. Numerous laws were passed to weaken the Catholic Church. In 1879, priests were excluded from the administrative committees of hospitals and boards of charity; in 1880, new measures were directed against the religious congregations; from 1880 to 1890 came the substitution of lay women for nuns in many hospitals; in 1882, the Ferry school laws were passed. Napoleon's Concordat of 1801 continued in operation, but in 1881, the government cut off salaries to priests it disliked.

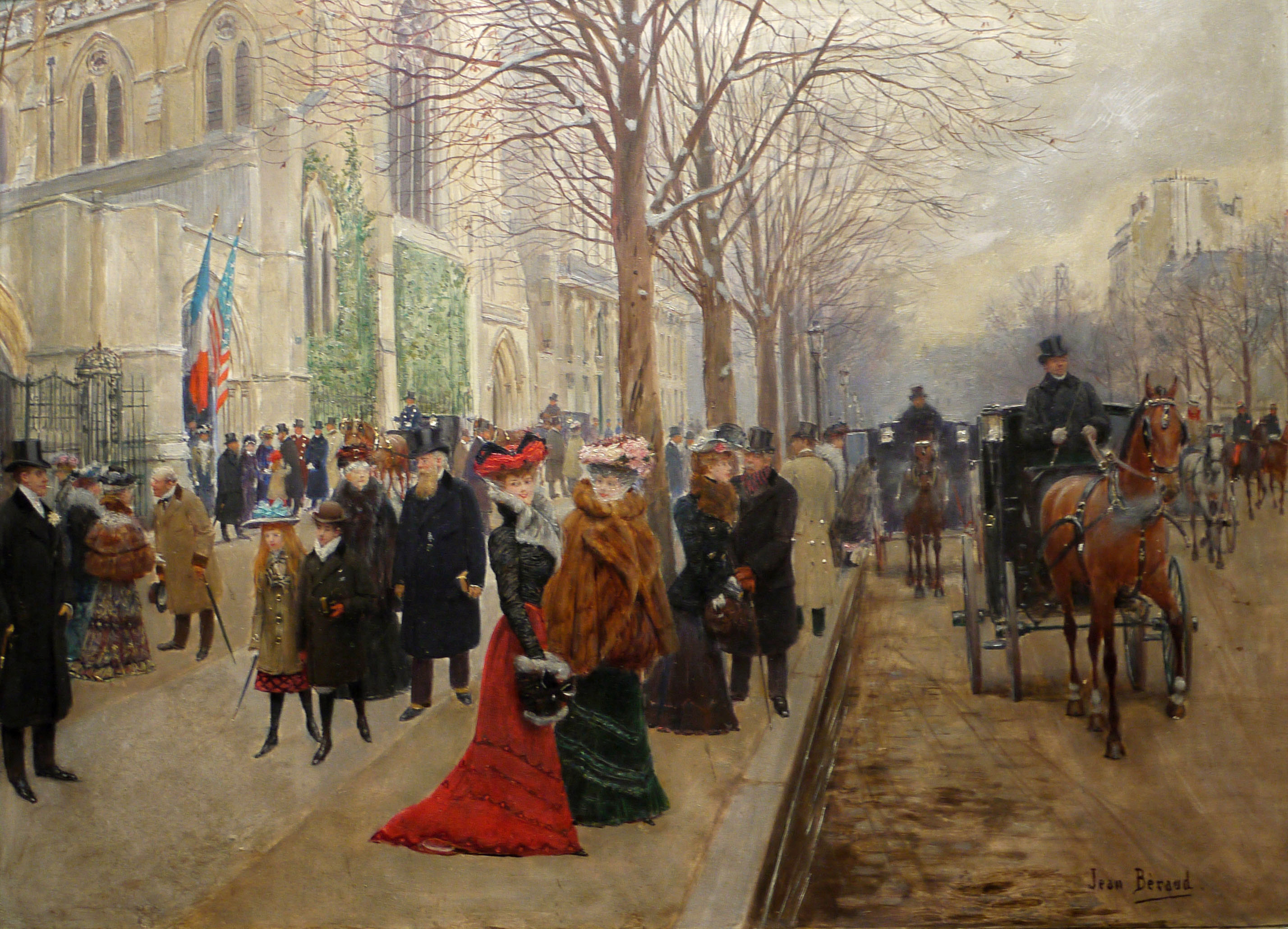
Après l'Office à l'Eglise de la Ste-Trinité (After the Service at Holy Trinity Church) by Jean Béraud, 1900

Republicans feared that religious orders in control of schools—especially the Jesuits and Assumptionists—indoctrinated anti-republicanism into children. Determined to root this out, republicans insisted they needed control of the schools for France to achieve economic and militaristic progress. (Republicans felt one of the primary reasons for the German victory in 1870 was their superior education system.)

The early anti-Catholic laws were largely the work of republican Jules Ferry in 1882. Religious instruction in all schools was forbidden, and religious orders were forbidden to teach in them. Funds were appropriated from religious schools to build more state schools. Later in the century, other laws passed by Ferry's successors further weakened the Church's position in French society. Civil marriage became compulsory, divorce was introduced, and chaplains were removed from the army.

When Leo XIII became pope in 1878, he tried to calm Church-State relations. In 1884, he told French bishops not to act in a hostile manner toward the State (Nobilissima Gallorum gens). In 1892 he issued Au milieu des sollicitudes, an encyclical advising French Catholics to rally to the Republic and defend the Church by participating in republican politics. The Popular Liberal Action (Action libérale populaire, or ALP) party was founded in 1901 by Jacques Piou and Albert de Mun, former monarchists who switched to republicanism at the request of Pope Leo XIII. From the Church's perspective, its mission was to express the political ideals and new social doctrines embodied in Leo's 1891 encyclical Rerum novarum.

Action libérale was the parliamentary group from which the ALP political party emerged, adding the word populaire ("popular") to signify this expansion. Membership was open to everyone, not just Catholics. It sought to gather all the "honest people" and to be the melting pot sought by Leo XIII where Catholics and moderate Republicans would unite to support a policy of tolerance and social progress. Its motto summarized its program: "Liberty for all; equality before the law; better conditions for the workers." However, the "old republicans" were few, and it did not manage to regroup all Catholics, as it was shunned by monarchists, Christian democrats, and Integrists. In the end, it recruited mostly among the liberal-Catholics (Jacques Piou) and the Social Catholics (Albert de Mun). The ALP was drawn into battle from its very beginnings (its first steps coincided with the beginning of the Combes ministry and its anticlerical combat policy), as religious matters were at the heart of its preoccupations. It defended the Church in the name of liberty and common law. Fiercely fought by the Action française, the movement declined from 1908, when it lost the support of Rome. Nevertheless, the ALP remained until 1914 the most important party on the right.

The attempt at improving the relationship with republicans failed. Deep-rooted suspicions remained on both sides and were inflamed by the Dreyfus Affair (1894–1906). Catholics were for the most part anti-Dreyfusard. The Assumptionists published antisemitic and anti-republican articles in their journal La Croix. This infuriated republican politicians, who were eager to take revenge. Often they worked in alliance with Masonic lodges. The Waldeck-Rousseau Ministry (1899–1902) and the Combes Ministry (1902–1905) fought with the Vatican over the appointment of bishops. Chaplains were removed from naval and military hospitals in the years 1903 and 1904, and soldiers were ordered not to frequent Catholic clubs in 1904.

Emile Combes, when elected Prime Minister in 1902, was determined to defeat Catholicism thoroughly. After only a short while in office, he closed down all parochial schools in France. Then he had parliament reject authorization of all religious orders. This meant that all fifty-four orders in France were banned and about 20,000 members immediately left France, many for Spain. In 1904, Émile Loubet, the president of France from 1899 to 1906, visited King Victor Emmanuel III of Italy in Rome, and Pope Pius X protested at this recognition of the Italian State. Combes reacted strongly and recalled his ambassador to the Holy See. Then, in 1905, a law was introduced that abolished Napoleon's 1801 Concordat. Church and State were declared separate, though all Church property was confiscated. Religious personnel were no longer paid by the State. Public worship was to be given over to associations of Catholic laymen who controlled access to churches. However, in practice, masses and rituals continued to be performed.

Combes was vigorously opposed by all the Conservative parties, who saw the mass closure of church schools as a persecution of religion. Combes led the anti-clerical coalition on the left, facing opposition primarily organized by the pro-Catholic ALP. The ALP had a stronger popular base, with better financing and a stronger network of newspapers, but had far fewer seats in parliament.

The Combes government worked with Masonic lodges to create a secret surveillance of all army officers to make sure that devout Catholics would not be promoted. Exposed as the Affaire Des Fiches, the scandal undermined support for the Combes government, and he resigned. It also undermined morale in the army, as officers realized that hostile spies examining their private lives were more important to their careers than their own professional accomplishments.

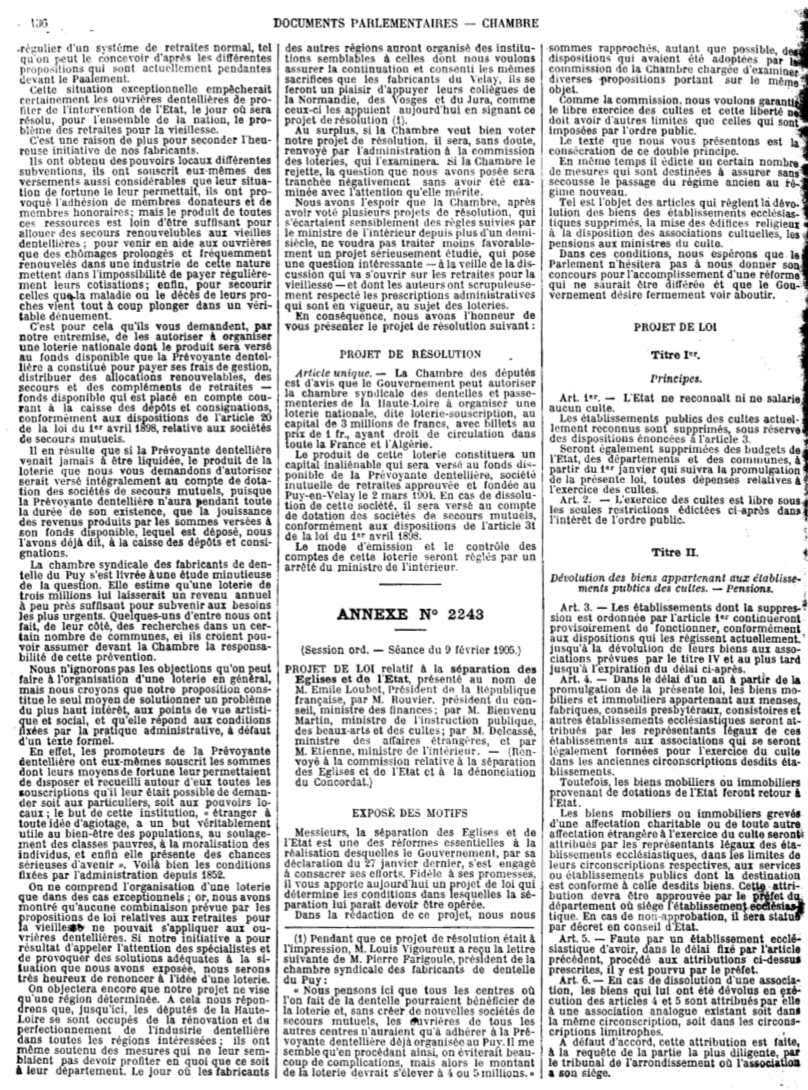
The first page of the French bill on separation of Church and State, as brought before the Chambre des Députés in 1905

In December 1905, the government of Maurice Rouvier introduced the French law on the separation of Church and State. This law was heavily supported by Combes, who had been strictly enforcing the 1901 voluntary association law and the 1904 law on religious congregations' freedom of teaching. On 10 February 1905, the Chamber declared that "the attitude of the Vatican" had rendered the separation of Church and State inevitable and the law of the separation of church and state was passed in December 1905. The Church was badly hurt and lost half its priests. In the long run, however, it gained autonomy; ever after, the State no longer had a voice in choosing bishops, thus Gallicanism was dead.

== Foreign policy 1871 to 1914 ==
Foreign policy of 1871–1914 was based on a slow rebuilding of alliances with Russia and Britain in order to counteract the threat from Germany. Bismarck had made a mistake in taking Alsace and Lorraine in 1871, setting off decades of popular hatred of Germany and demand for revenge. Bismarck's decision came in response to popular demand, and the Army's demand for a strong frontier. It was not necessary since France was much weaker militarily than Germany, but it forced Bismarck to orient German foreign policy to block France from having any major allies.

France rebuilt its Army, emphasizing modernization in such features as new artillery, and after 1905 invested heavily in military aircraft. Most important in restoring prestige was a strong emphasis on the growing colonial empire, which brought prestige, despite large financial costs. Very few French families settled in the colonies, and they were too poor in natural resources and trade to significantly benefit the overall economy. Nevertheless, they were second in size only to the British Empire, provided prestige in world affairs, and gave an opportunity for Catholics (under heavy attack by the Republicans in Parliament) to devote their energies to spread French culture and civilization worldwide. An extremely expensive investment in building the Panama Canal was a total failure, in terms of money, many deaths by disease, and political scandal. Bismarck was fired in 1890, and after that German foreign policy was confused and misdirected. For example, Berlin broke its close ties with St. Petersburg, allowing the French to enter through heavy financial investment, and a Paris–St Petersburg military alliance that proved essential and durable. Germany feuded with Britain, which encouraged London and Paris to drop their grievances over Egypt and Africa, reaching a compromise whereby the French recognized British primacy in Egypt, while Britain recognized French primacy in Morocco. This enabled Britain and France to move closer together, finally achieving an informal military relationship after 1904.

=== Diplomats ===
French diplomacy was largely independent of domestic affairs; economic, cultural and religious interest groups paid little attention to foreign affairs. Permanent professional diplomats and bureaucrats had developed their own traditions of how to operate in the Ministry of Foreign Affairs, and their style changed little from generation to generation. Most of the diplomats came from high status aristocratic families. Although France was one of the few republics in Europe, its diplomats mingled smoothly with the aristocratic representatives at the royal courts. Prime ministers and leading politicians generally paid little attention to foreign affairs, allowing a handful of senior men to control policy. In the decades before the First World War they dominated the embassies in the 10 major countries where France had an ambassador (elsewhere, they sent lower-ranking ministers). They included Théophile Delcassé, the foreign minister from 1898 to 1905; Paul Cambon, in London, 1890–1920; Jules Jusserand, in Washington from 1902 to 1924; and Camille Barrère, in Rome from 1897 to 1924. In terms of foreign policy, there was general agreement about the need for high protective tariffs, which kept agricultural prices high. After the defeat by the Germans, there was a strong widespread anti-German sentiment focused on revanchism and regaining Alsace and Lorraine. The Empire was a matter of great pride, and service as administrators, soldiers and missionaries was a high status occupation.

French foreign policy from 1871 to 1914 showed a dramatic transformation from a humiliated power with no friends and not much of an empire in 1871, to the centerpiece of the European alliance system in 1914, with a flourishing colonial empire that was second in size only to Great Britain. Although religion was a hotly contested matter in domestic politics, the Catholic Church made missionary work and church building a speciality in the colonies. Most Frenchmen ignored foreign policy; its issues were a low priority in politics.

=== 1871–1900 ===
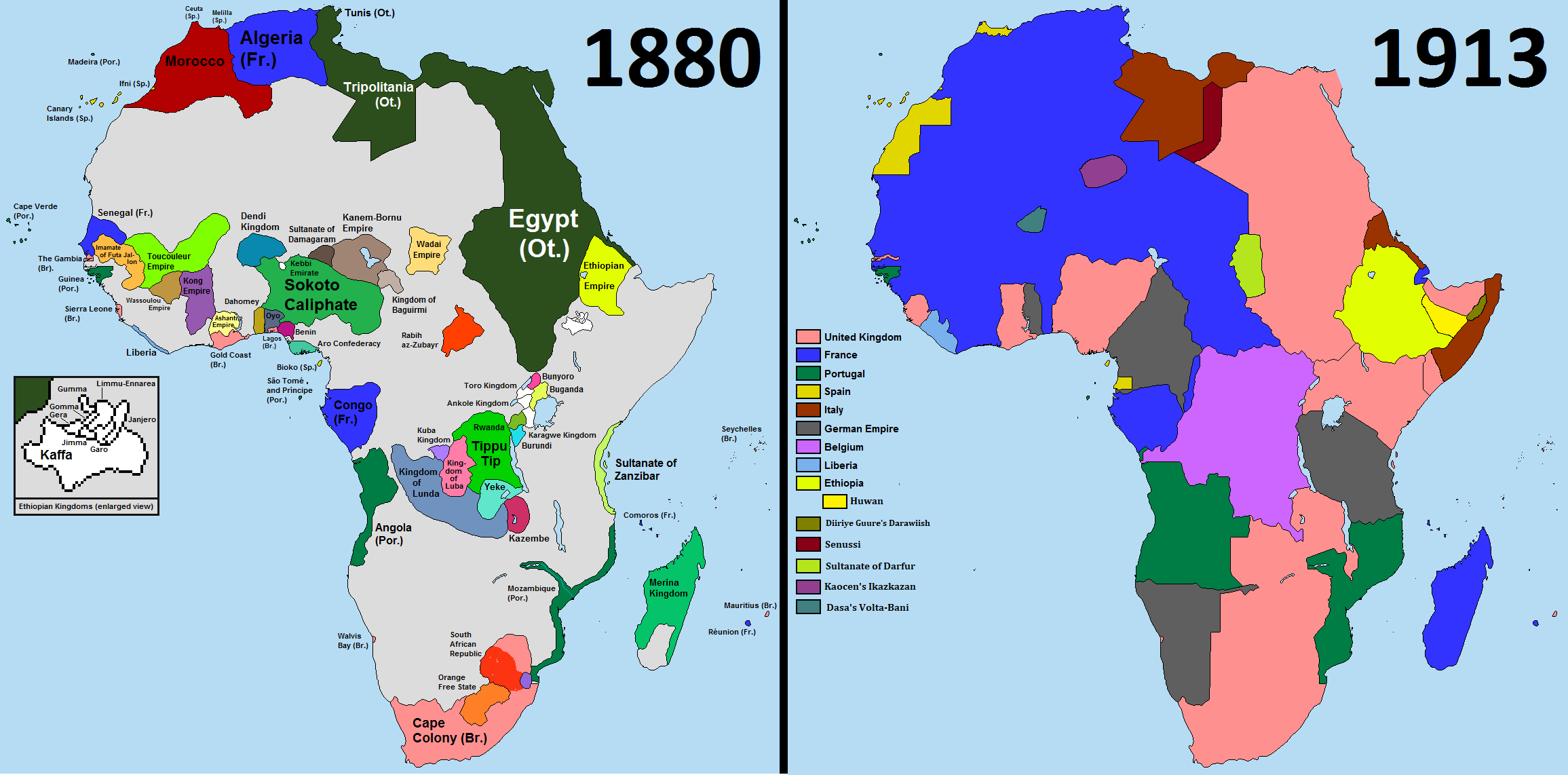
Comparison of Africa in the years 1880 and 1913

French foreign policy was based on a fear of Germany—whose larger size and fast-growing economy could not be matched—combined with a revanchism that demanded the return of Alsace and Lorraine. At the same time, imperialism was a factor. In the midst of the Scramble for Africa, French and British interest in Africa came into conflict. The most dangerous episode was the Fashoda Incident of 1898 when French troops tried to claim an area in the Southern Sudan, and a British force purporting to be acting in the interests of the Khedive of Egypt arrived. Under heavy pressure the French withdrew, securing Anglo-Egyptian control over the area. The status quo was recognised by an agreement between the two states acknowledging British control over Egypt, while France became the dominant power in Morocco, but France suffered a humiliating defeat overall.

The Suez Canal, initially built by the French, became a joint British-French project in 1875, as both saw it as vital to maintaining their influence and empires in Asia. In 1882, ongoing civil disturbances in Egypt prompted Britain to intervene, extending a hand to France. The government allowed Britain to take effective control of Egypt.

France had colonies in Asia and looked for alliances and found in Japan a possible ally. At Japan's request, Paris sent military missions in 1872–1880, in 1884–1889 and in 1918–1919 to help modernize the Japanese army. Conflicts with China over Indochina climaxed during the Sino-French War (1884–1885). Admiral Courbet destroyed the Chinese fleet anchored at Fuzhou. The treaty ending the war put France in a protectorate over northern and central Vietnam, which it divided into Tonkin and Annam.

Under the leadership of expansionist Jules Ferry, the Third Republic greatly expanded the French colonial empire. France acquired Indochina, Madagascar, vast territories in West Africa and Central Africa, and much of Polynesia.

=== 1900–1914 ===
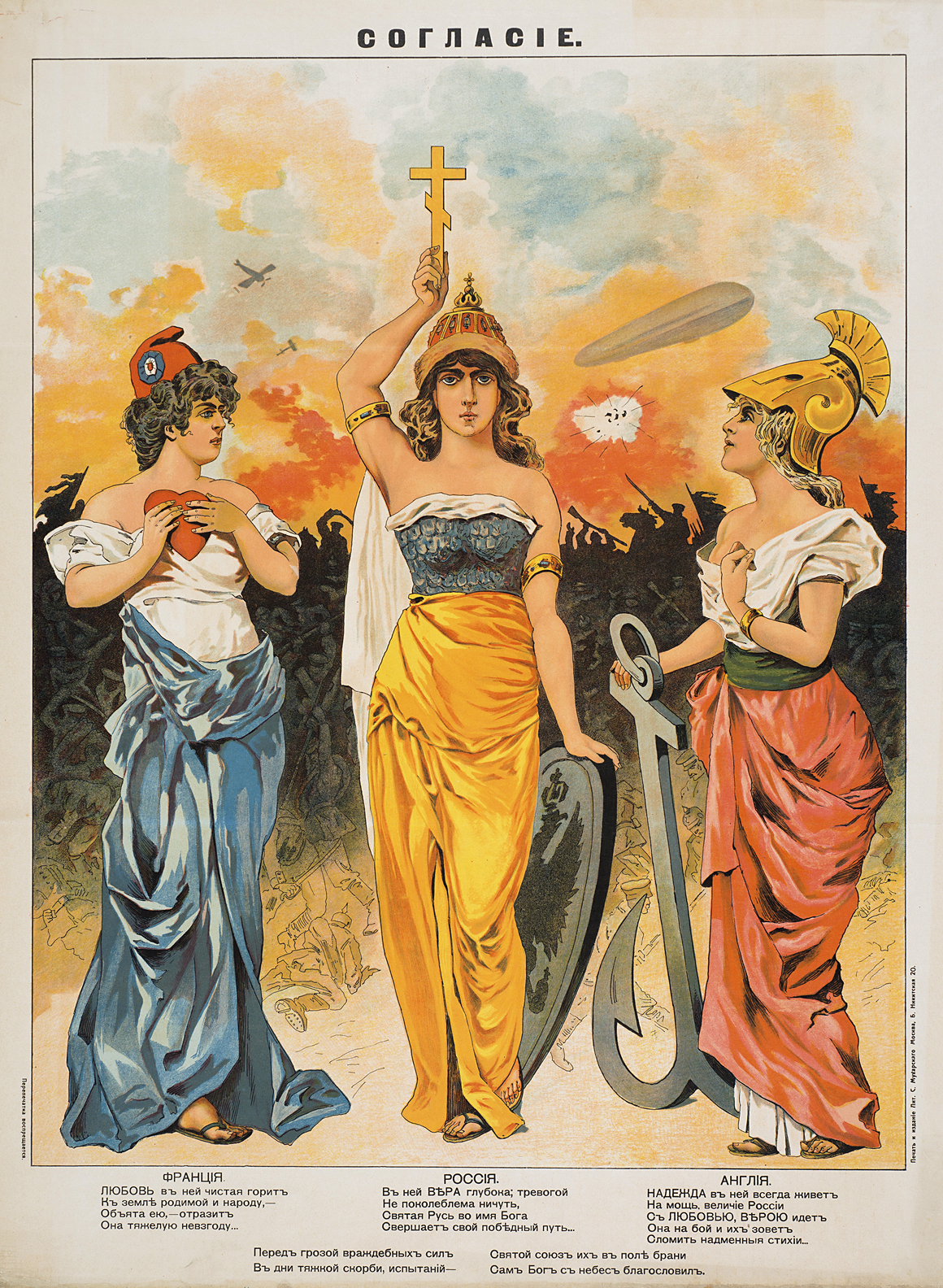
Marianne (left), Mother Russia (centre) and Britannia (right) personifying the Triple Entente as opposed to the Triple Alliance

In an effort to isolate Germany, France went to great pains to woo Russia and Great Britain, first by means of the Franco-Russian Alliance of 1894, then the 1904 Entente Cordiale with Great Britain, and finally the Anglo-Russian Entente in 1907 which became the Triple Entente. This alliance with Britain and Russia against Germany and Austria eventually led Russia, Britain, and France to enter World War I as Allies.

French foreign policy in the years leading up to the First World War was based largely on hostility to and fear of German power. France secured an alliance with the Russian Empire in 1894 after diplomatic talks between Germany and Russia had failed to produce any working agreement. The Franco-Russian Alliance served as the cornerstone of French foreign policy until 1917. A further link with Russia was provided by vast French investments and loans before 1914. In 1904, French foreign minister Théophile Delcassé negotiated the Entente Cordiale with Henry Petty-Fitzmaurice, 5th Marquess of Lansdowne, the British Foreign Secretary, an agreement that ended a long period of Anglo-French tensions and hostility. The Entente Cordiale, which functioned as an informal Anglo-French alliance, was further strengthened by the First and Second Moroccan crises of 1905 and 1911, and by secret military and naval staff talks. Delcassé's rapprochement with Britain was controversial in France as Anglophobia was prominent around the start of the 20th century, sentiments that had been much reinforced by the Fashoda Incident of 1898, in which Britain and France had almost gone to war, and by the Boer War, in which French public opinion was very much on the side of Britain's enemies. Ultimately, the fear of German power was the link that bound Britain and France together.

Preoccupied with internal problems, France paid little attention to foreign policy in the period between late 1912 and mid-1914, although it did extend military service to three years from two over strong Socialist objections in 1913. The rapidly escalating Balkan crisis of July 1914 surprised France, and not much attention was given to conditions that led to the outbreak of World War I.

=== Overseas colonies ===
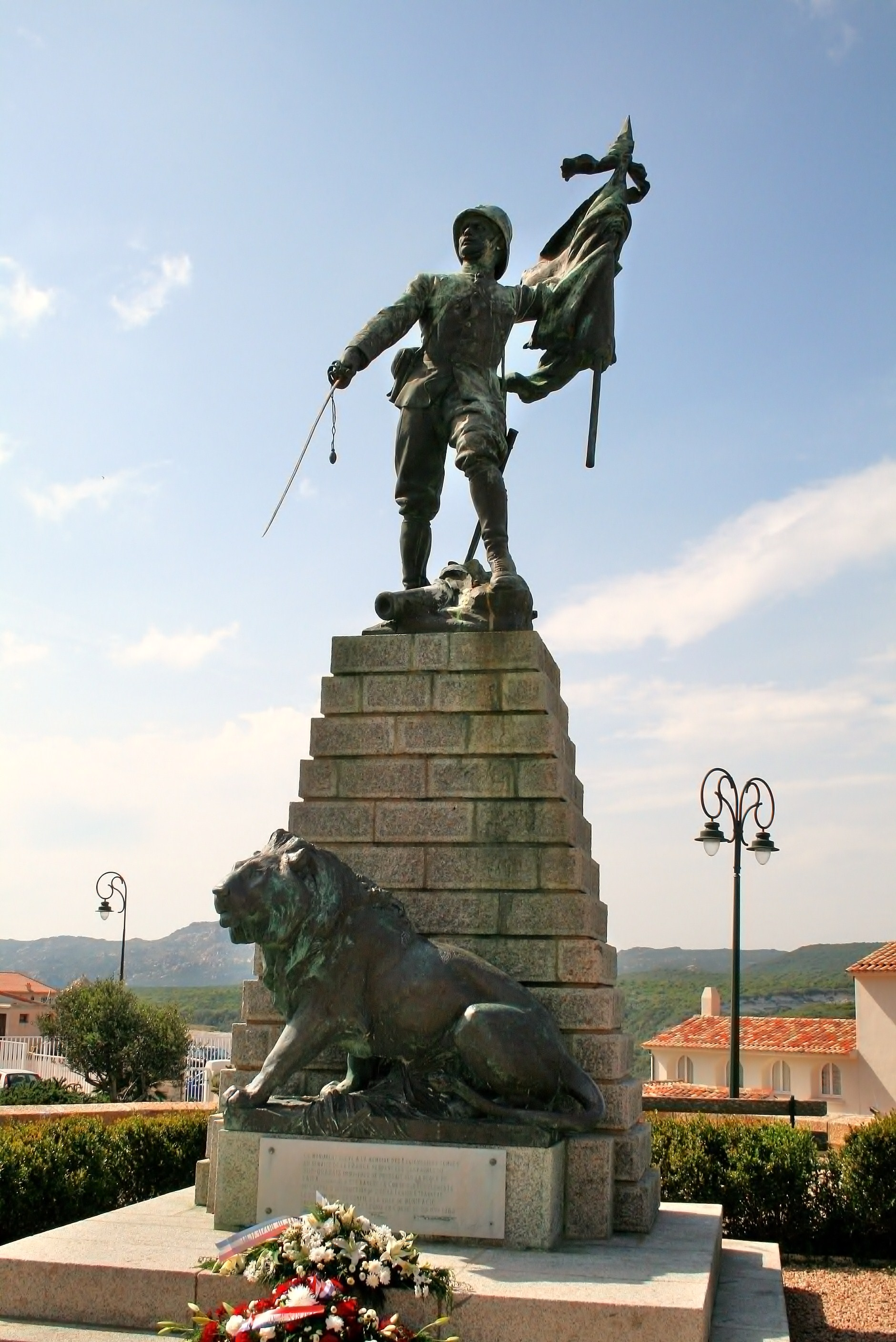
Monument in Bonifacio commemorating the soldiers of the French Foreign Legion killed on duty for France during the South-oranais campaign (1897–1902)

The Third Republic, in line with the imperialistic ethos of the day sweeping Europe, developed a French colonial empire. The largest and most important were in French North Africa and French Indochina. French administrators, soldiers, and missionaries were dedicated to bringing French civilization to the local populations of these colonies (the mission civilisatrice). Some French businessmen went overseas, but there were few permanent settlements. The Catholic Church became deeply involved. Its missionaries were unattached men committed to staying permanently, learning local languages and customs, and converting the natives to Christianity.

France successfully integrated the colonies into its economic system. By 1939, one third of its exports went to its colonies; Paris businessmen invested heavily in agriculture, mining, and shipping. In Indochina, new plantations were opened for rice and natural rubber. In Algeria, land held by rich settlers rose from 1,600,000 hectares in 1890 to 2,700,000 hectares in 1940; combined with similar operations in Morocco and Tunisia, the result was that North African agriculture became one of the most efficient in the world. Metropolitan France was a captive market, so large landowners could borrow large sums in Paris to modernize agricultural techniques with tractors and mechanized equipment. The result was a dramatic increase in the export of wheat, corn, peaches, and olive oil. French Algeria became the fourth most important wine producer in the world. Nickel mining in New Caledonia was also important.

Opposition to colonial rule led to rebellions in Morocco in 1925, Syria in 1926, and Indochina in 1930, all of which the colonial army quickly suppressed.

== First World War ==
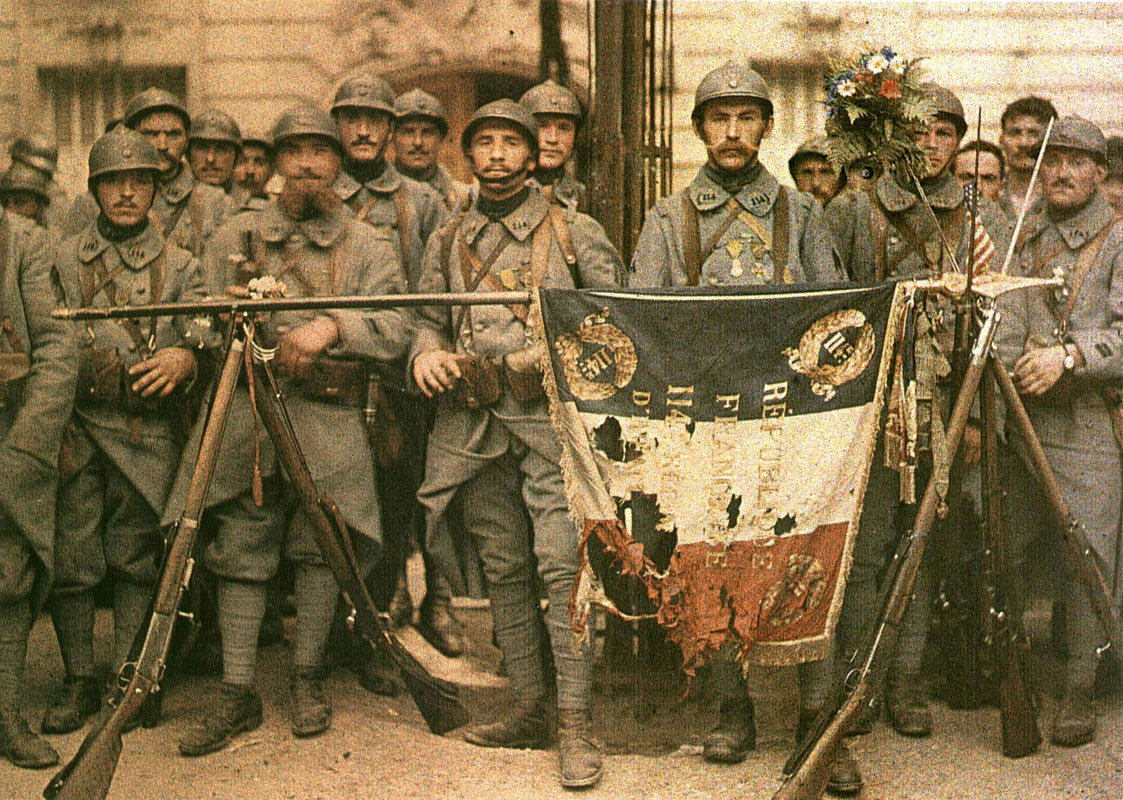
France sustained the highest number of casualties among the Entente in World War I.

=== Entry ===
France entered World War I when Germany declared war (Aug 3rd) and invaded neutral Luxembourg and attacked the French border. Decisions were all made by senior officials, especially President Raymond Poincaré, Premier and Foreign Minister René Viviani, and the ambassador to Russia Maurice Paléologue. Not involved in the decision-making were military leaders, arms manufacturers, the newspapers, pressure groups, party leaders, or spokesmen for French nationalism.

The UK wanted to remain neutral but entered the war when the German army invaded Belgium on its way to Paris. The Anglo-French victory at the Battle of the Marne in September 1914 ensured the failure of Germany's strategy to win quickly. It became a long and very bloody war of attrition, but France emerged on the winning side.

French intellectuals welcomed the war to avenge the humiliation of defeat and loss of territory in 1871. At the grass roots, Paul Déroulède's League of Patriots, a proto-fascist movement based in the lower middle class, had advocated a war of revenge since the 1880s. The strong socialist movement had long opposed war and preparation for war. However, when its leader Jean Jaurès, a pacifist, was assassinated at the start of the war, the French socialist movement abandoned its anti-militarist positions and joined the national war effort. President Raymond Poincaré called for unity in the form of a "Union sacrée" ("Sacred Union"), and in France there were few dissenters.

=== Fighting ===
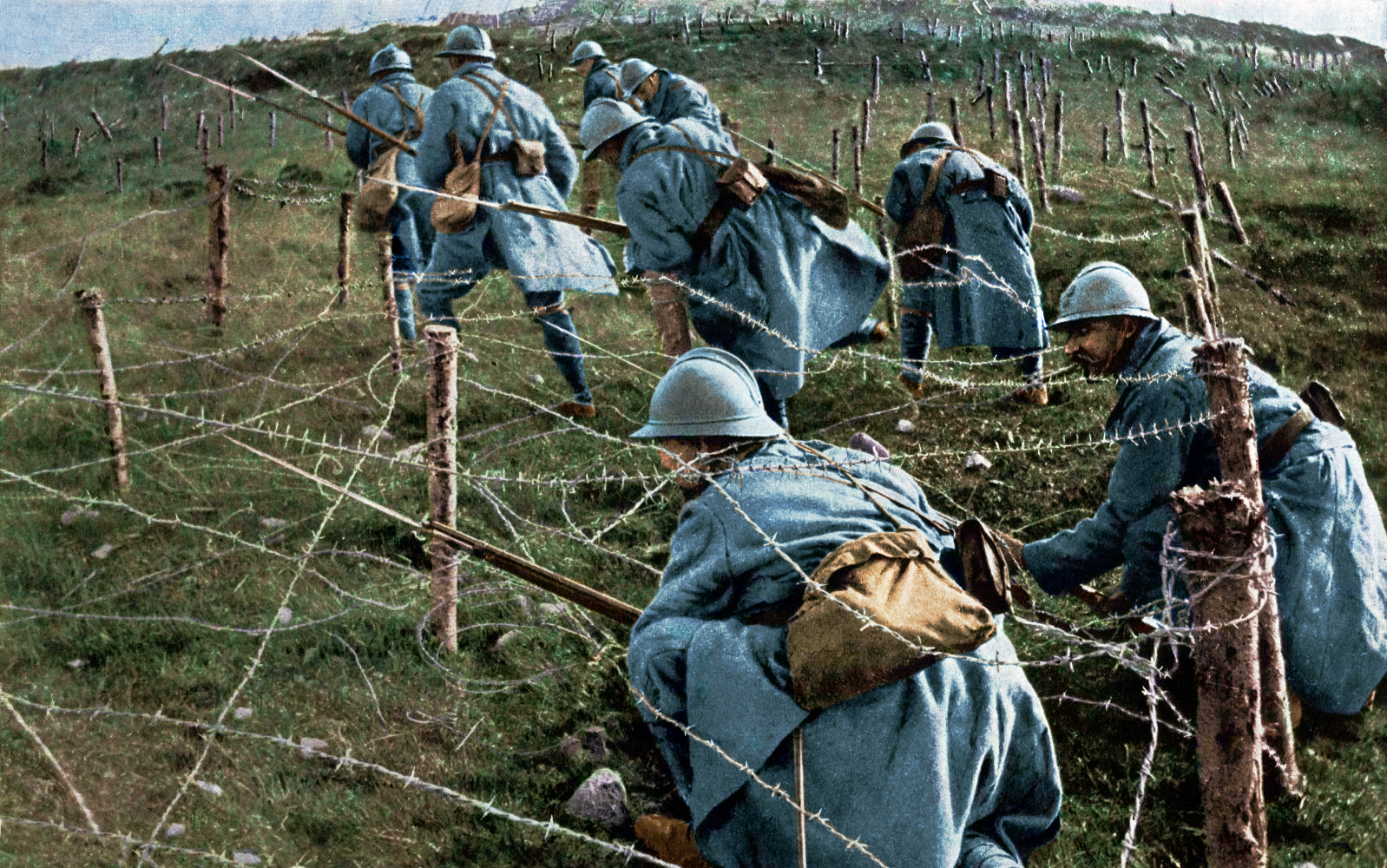
French infantry pushing through enemy barbed wire, 1915

After the French army successfully defended Paris in 1914, the conflict became one of trench warfare along the Western Front, with very high casualty rates. It became a war of attrition. Until spring of 1918 there were almost no territorial gains or losses for either side. Georges Clemenceau, whose ferocious energy and determination earned him the nickname le Tigre ("the Tiger"), led a coalition government after 1917 that was determined to defeat Germany. Meanwhile, large swaths of northeastern France fell under the brutal control of German occupiers. The bloodbath of the war of attrition reached its apogee in the Battles of Verdun and the Somme. By 1917 mutiny was in the air. A consensus among soldiers agreed to resist any German attacks, but to postpone French attacks until the Americans arrived.

A state of emergency was proclaimed and censorship imposed, leading to the creation in 1915 of the satirical newspaper Le Canard enchaîné to bypass the censorship. The economy was hurt by the German invasion of major industrial areas in the northeast. Although the occupied area in 1914 contained only 14% of France's industrial workers, it produced 58% of the steel and 40% of the coal.

=== War economy ===
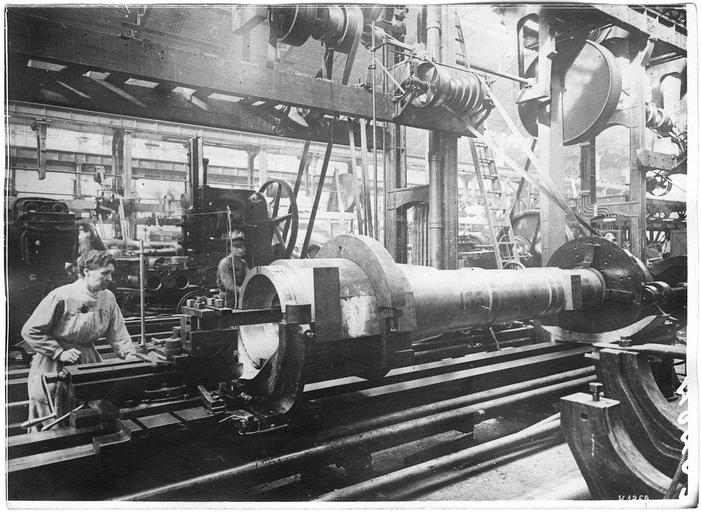
A female worker turning a barrel for a 280-mm howitzer Mle 1914 at the Harfleur plant, 1916

In 1914, the government implemented a war economy with controls and rationing. By 1915, the war economy went into high gear, as millions of French women and colonial men replaced the civilian roles of many of the 3 million soldiers. Considerable assistance came with the influx of American food, money and raw materials in 1917. This war economy would have important reverberations after the war, as it would be a first breach of liberal theories of non-interventionism.

The production of munitions proved a striking success, well ahead of Britain or the United States or even Germany. The challenges were monumental: the German seizure of the industrial heartland in the northeast, a shortage of manpower, and a mobilization plan that left France on the brink of defeat. Nevertheless, by 1918 France was producing more munitions and artillery than its allies, while supplying virtually all of the heavy equipment needed by the arriving American army. (Note: The Americans left their heavy weapons at home in order to use the few available transports to send as many soldiers to front as possible in the shortest amount of time.) Building on foundations laid in the early months of the war, the Ministry of War matched production to the operational and tactical needs of the army, with an emphasis on meeting the insatiable demands for artillery. The elaborately designed link between industry and the army, and the compromises made to ensure that artillery and shells of the required quantity and quality were supplied, proved crucial to French success on the battlefield.

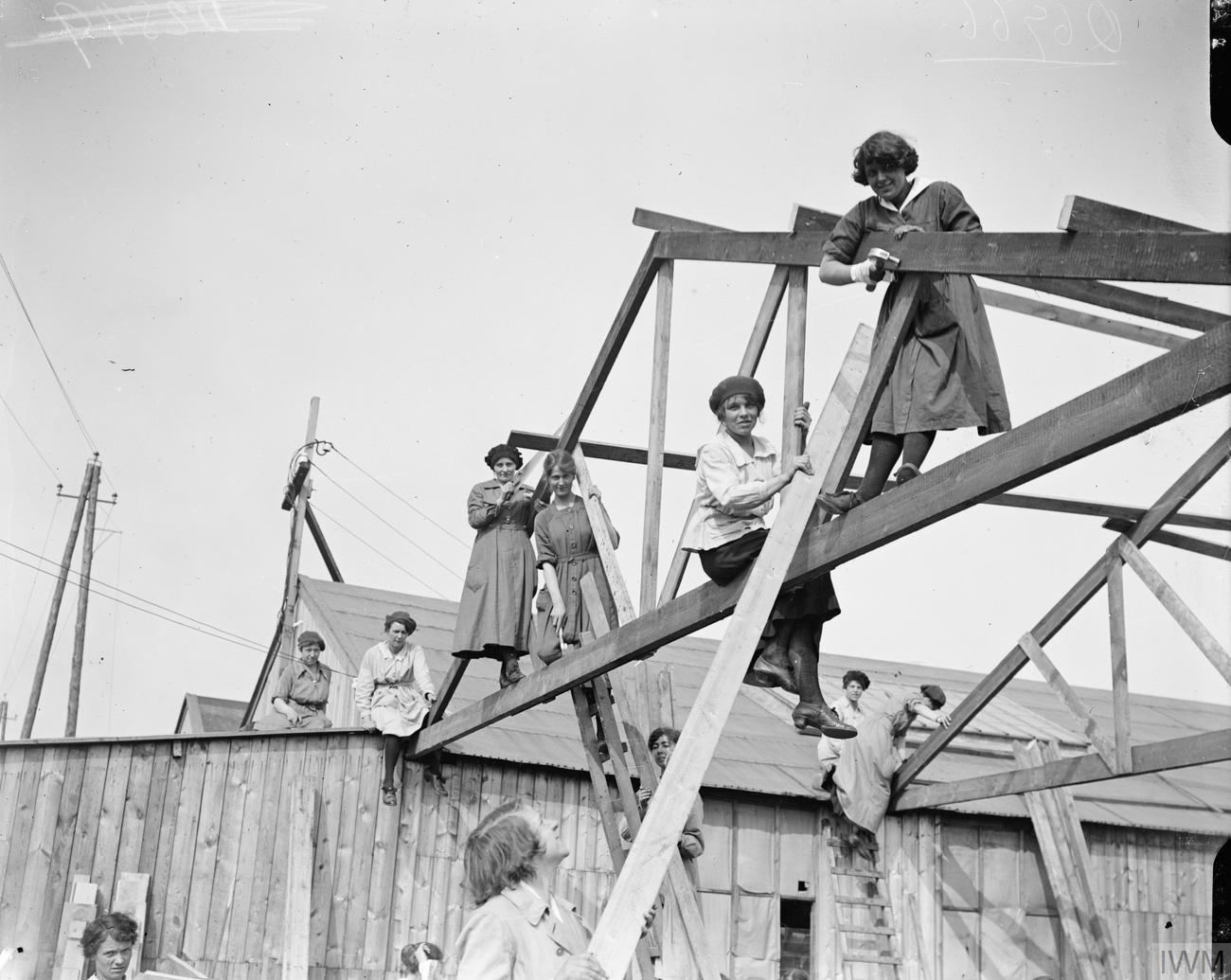
Women carpenters near Calais, France, June 1918

In the end the damages caused by the war amounted to about 113% of the Gross Domestic Product (GDP) of 1913, chiefly the destruction of productive capital and housing. The national debt rose from 66% of GDP in 1913 to 170% in 1919, reflecting the heavy use of bond issues to pay for the war. Inflation was severe, with the franc losing over half its value against the British pound.

=== Morale ===
To uplift the French national spirit, many intellectuals began to fashion patriotic propaganda. The Union sacrée sought to draw the French people closer to the actual front and thus garner social, political, and economic support for the soldiers. Antiwar sentiment was very weak among the general population. However, among intellectuals there was a pacifistic "Ligue des Droits de l'Homme" (League for the Rights of Mankind) (LDH). It kept a low profile in the first two years of war, holding its first congress in November 1916 against the background slaughters French soldiers on the Western Front. The theme was the "conditions for a lasting peace." Discussions focused on France's relationship with its autocratic, undemocratic ally, Russia, and in particular how to square support for all that the LDH stood for with Russia's bad treatment of its oppressed minorities, especially the Poles. Secondly, many delegates wanted to issue a demand for a negotiated peace. This was rejected only after a lengthy debate showed how the LDH was divided between a majority that believed that arbitration could be applied only in times of peace, and a minority that demanded an immediate end to the carnage. In spring 1918 the desperate German offensive failed, and the Allies successfully pushed back. The French people of all classes rallied to Prime Minister Georges Clemenceau's demand for total victory and harsh peace terms.

== Peace and revenge in Versailles Treaty ==
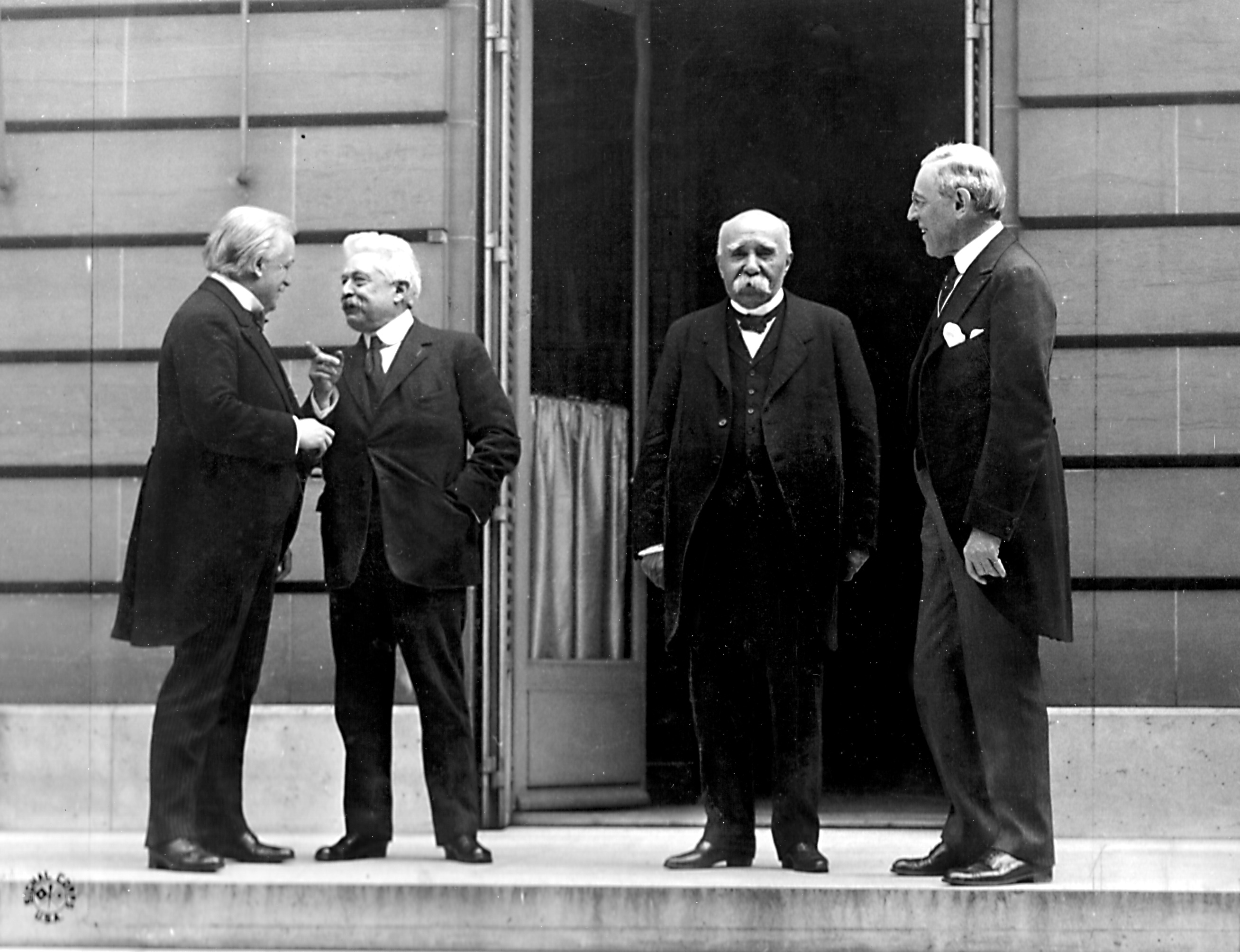
The Council of Four in Versailles, 1919: David Lloyd George of Britain, Vittorio Emanuele Orlando of Italy, Georges Clemenceau of France and Woodrow Wilson of the United States

The entry into war by the United States turned the war around and in the summer and autumn of 1918 led to the defeat of Germany. The most important factors that led to the surrender of Germany were its exhaustion after four years of fighting and the arrival of large numbers of troops from the United States beginning in the summer of 1918. Peace terms were imposed on Germany by the Big Four: Great Britain, France, the United States, and Italy.

Clemenceau demanded the harshest terms and won most of them in the Treaty of Versailles in 1919. Germany was largely disarmed and forced to take full responsibility for the war, meaning that it was expected to pay huge war reparations. France regained Alsace–Lorraine, and the German industrial Saar Basin, a coal and steel region, was occupied by France. The German African colonies, such as Kamerun, were partitioned between France and Britain. From the remains of the Ottoman Empire, Germany's ally during World War I that also collapsed at the end of the conflict, France acquired the Mandate of Syria and the Mandate of Lebanon.

== Interwar period ==
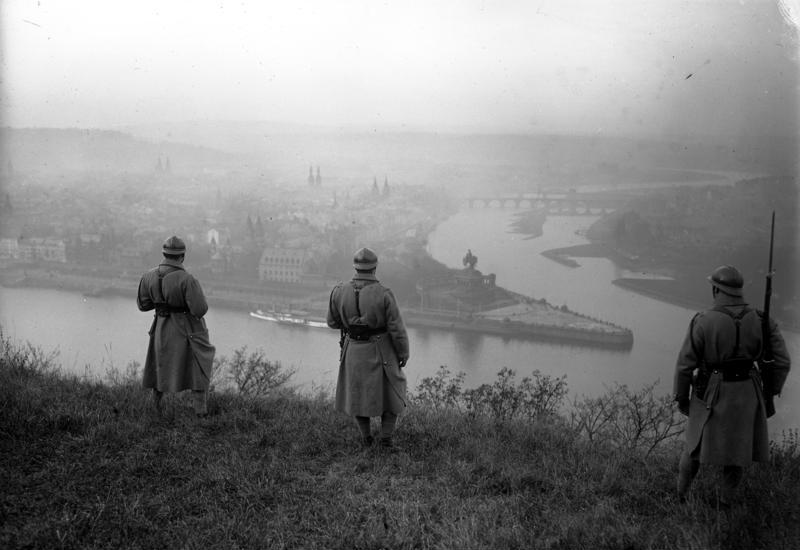
French soldiers observing the Rhine at Deutsches Eck, Koblenz, during the Occupation of the Rhineland

From 1919 to 1940, France was governed by two main groupings of political alliances. On the one hand, there was the right-center Bloc national led by Georges Clemenceau, Raymond Poincaré and Aristide Briand. The Bloc was supported by business and finance and was friendly toward the army and the Church. Its main goals were revenge against Germany, economic prosperity for French business and stability in domestic affairs. On the other hand, there was the left-center Cartel des gauches dominated by Édouard Herriot of the Radical Socialist party. Herriot's party was in fact neither radical nor socialist, rather it represented the interests of small business and the lower middle class. It was intensely anti-clerical and resisted the Catholic Church. The Cartel was occasionally willing to form a coalition with the Socialist Party. Anti-democratic groups, such as the Communists on the left and royalists on the right, played relatively minor roles.

The flow of reparations from Germany played a central role in strengthening French finances. The government began a large-scale reconstruction program to repair wartime damages, and was burdened with a very large public debt. Taxation policies were inefficient, with widespread evasion, and when the financial crisis grew worse in 1926, Poincaré levied new taxes, reformed the system of tax collection, and drastically reduced government spending to balance the budget and stabilize the franc. Holders of the national debt lost 80% of the face value of their bonds, but runaway inflation did not occur. From 1926 to 1929, the French economy prospered and manufacturing flourished.

Foreign observers in the 1920s noted the excesses of the French upper classes, but emphasized the rapid re-building of the regions of northeastern France that had seen warfare and occupation. They reported the improvement of financial markets, the brilliance of the post-war literature and the revival of public morale.

=== Great Depression ===
The world economic crisis known as the Great Depression affected France a bit later than other countries, hitting around 1931. While the GDP in the 1920s grew at the very strong rate of 4.43% per year, the 1930s rate fell to only 0.63%. In comparison to countries such as the United States, Great Britain, and Germany, the depression was relatively mild: unemployment peaked under 5%, and the fall in production was at most 20% below the 1929 output. In addition, there was no banking crisis.

In 1931 the well-organized veterans movement demanded and received pensions for their wartime service. This was funded by a lottery—the first one allowed in France since 1836. The lottery immediately became popular, and became a major foundation of the annual budget. Although the Great Depression was not yet severe, the lottery appealed to charitable impulses, greed, and respect for veterans. These contradictory impulses produced cash that made possible the French welfare state, at the crossroads of philanthropy, market and public sphere.

==== 6 February 1934 crisis ====
The 6 February 1934 crisis was an anti-parliamentarist street demonstration in Paris organized by multiple far-right leagues that culminated in a riot on the Place de la Concorde, near the seat of the French National Assembly. The police shot and killed 15 demonstrators. It was one of the major political crises during the Third Republic (1870–1940). Frenchmen on the left feared it was an attempt to organize a fascist coup d'état. As a result of the actions of that day, several anti-fascist organizations were created, such as the Comité de vigilance des intellectuels antifascistes, in an attempt to thwart the rise of fascism in France. According to historian Joel Colton, "The consensus among scholars is that there was no concerted or unified design to seize power and that the leagues lacked the coherence, unity, or leadership to accomplish such an end."

=== Foreign policy ===
Foreign policy was of growing concern to France during the inter-war period, with fears of German militarism in the forefront. The horrible devastation of the war, including the death of 1.5 million French soldiers, the devastation of much of the steel and coal regions, and the long-term costs for veterans, were always remembered. France demanded that Germany assume many of the costs incurred from the war through annual reparation payments. French foreign and security policy used the balance of power and alliance politics to compel Germany to comply with its obligations under the Treaty of Versailles. The problem was that the United States and Britain rejected a defensive alliance. Potential allies in Eastern Europe, such as Poland, Czechoslovakia and Yugoslavia were too weak to confront Germany. Russia had been the long term French ally in the East, but now it was controlled by the Bolsheviks, who were deeply distrusted in Paris. France's transition to a more conciliatory policy in 1924 was a response to pressure from Britain and the United States, as well as to French weakness.

France enthusiastically joined the League of Nations in 1919, but felt betrayed by President Woodrow Wilson, when his promises that the United States would sign a defence treaty with France and join the League were rejected by the United States Congress. The main goal of French foreign policy was to preserve French power and neutralize the threat posed by Germany. When Germany fell behind in reparations payments in 1923, France seized the industrialized Ruhr region. The British Labour Prime Minister Ramsay MacDonald, who viewed reparations as impossible to pay successfully, pressured French Premier Édouard Herriot into a series of concessions to Germany. In total, France received £1600 million from Germany before reparations ended in 1932, but France had to pay war debts to the United States, and thus the net gain was only about £600 million.

France tried to create a web of defensive treaties against Germany with Poland, Czechoslovakia, Romania, Yugoslavia and the Soviet Union. There was little effort to build up the military strength or technological capabilities of these small allies, and they remained weak and divided among themselves. In the end, the alliances proved worthless. France also constructed a powerful defensive wall in the form of a network of fortresses along its German border. It was called the Maginot Line and was trusted to compensate for the heavy manpower losses of the First World War.

The main goal of foreign policy was the diplomatic response to the demands of the French army in the 1920s and 1930s to form alliances against the German threat, especially with Britain and with smaller countries in central Europe.

Appeasement was increasingly adopted as Germany grew stronger after 1933, for France suffered a stagnant economy, unrest in its colonies, and bitter internal political fighting. Appeasement, says historian Martin Thomas was not a coherent diplomatic strategy or a copying of the British. France appeased Italy on the Ethiopia question because it could not afford to risk an alliance between Italy and Germany. When Hitler sent troops into the Rhineland—the part of Germany where no troops were allowed—neither Paris nor London would risk war, and nothing was done. The military alliance with Czechoslovakia was sacrificed at Hitler's demand when France and Britain agreed to his terms at Munich in 1938.

=== Popular Front ===
In 1920, the socialist movement split, with the majority forming the French Communist Party. The minority, led by Léon Blum, kept the name Socialist, and by 1932 greatly outnumbered the disorganized Communists. When Stalin told French Communists to collaborate with others on the left in 1934, a popular front was made possible with an emphasis on unity against fascism. In 1936, the Socialists and the Radicals formed a coalition, with Communist support, to complete it.

The Popular Front's narrow victory in the elections of the spring of 1936 brought to power a government headed by the Socialists in alliance with the Radicals. The Communists supported its domestic policies, but did not take any seats in the cabinet. The prime minister was Léon Blum, a technocratic socialist who avoided making decisions. In two years in office, it focused on labour law changes sought by the trade unions, especially the mandatory 40-hour work week, down from 48 hours. All workers were given a two-week paid vacation. A collective bargaining law facilitated union growth; membership soared from 1,000,000 to 5,000,000 in one year, and workers' political strength was enhanced when the Communist and non-Communist unions joined. The government nationalized the armaments industry and tried to seize control of the Bank of France in an effort to break the power of the richest 200 families in the country. Farmers received higher prices, and the government purchased surplus wheat, but farmers had to pay higher taxes. Wave after wave of strikes hit French industry in 1936. Wage rates went up 48%, but the work week was cut back by 17%, and the cost of living rose 46%, so there was little real gain to the average worker. The higher prices for French products resulted in a decline in overseas sales, which the government tried to neutralize by devaluing the franc, a measure that led to a reduction in the value of bonds and savings accounts. The overall result was significant damage to the French economy, and a lower rate of growth.

Most historians judge the Popular Front a failure, although some call it a partial success. There is general agreement that it failed to live up to the expectations of the left.

Politically, the Popular Front fell apart over Blum's refusal to intervene vigorously in the Spanish Civil War, as demanded by the Communists. Culturally, the Popular Front forced the Communists to come to terms with elements of French society they had long ridiculed, such as patriotism, the veterans' sacrifice, the honour of being an army officer, the prestige of the bourgeois, and the leadership of the Socialist Party and the parliamentary Republic. Above all, the Communists portrayed themselves as French nationalists. Young Communists dressed in costumes from the revolutionary period and the scholars glorified the Jacobins as heroic predecessors.

=== Conservatism ===
Historians have turned their attention to the right in the interwar period, looking at various categories of conservatives and Catholic groups as well as the far right fascist movement. Conservative supporters of the old order were linked with the "haute bourgeoisie" (upper middle class), as well as nationalism, military power, the maintenance of the empire, and national security. The favourite enemy was the left, especially as represented by socialists. The conservatives were divided on foreign affairs. Several important conservative politicians sustained the journal Gringoire, foremost among them André Tardieu. The Revue des deux Mondes, with its prestigious past and sharp articles, was a major conservative organ.

Summer camps and youth groups were organized to promote conservative values in working-class families, and help them design a career path. The Croix de feu/Parti social français (CF/PSF) was especially active.

=== Relations with Catholicism ===
France's republican government had long been strongly anti-clerical. The Law of Separation of Church and State in 1905 had expelled many religious orders, declared all Church buildings government property, and led to the closing of most Church schools. Since that time, Pope Benedict XV had sought a rapprochement, but it was not achieved until the reign of Pope Pius XI (1922–1939). In the papal encyclical Maximam Gravissimamque (1924), many areas of dispute were tacitly settled and a bearable coexistence made possible.

The Catholic Church expanded its social activities after 1920, especially by forming youth movements. For example, the largest organization of young working women was the Jeunesse Ouvrière Chrétienne/Féminine (JOC/F), founded in 1928 by the progressive social activist priest Joseph Cardijn. It encouraged young working women to adopt Catholic approaches to morality and to prepare for future roles as mothers at the same time as it promoted notions of spiritual equality and encouraged young women to take active, independent, and public roles in the present. The model of youth groups was expanded to reach adults in the Ligue ouvrière chrétienne féminine ("League of Working Christian Women") and the Mouvement populaire des familles.

Catholics on the far right supported several shrill, but small, groupings that preached doctrines similar to fascism. The most influential was Action Française, founded in 1905 by the vitriolic author Charles Maurras. It was intensely nationalistic, antisemitic and reactionary, calling for a return to the monarchy and domination of the state by the Catholic Church. In 1926, Pope Pius XI condemned Action Française because the pope decided that it was folly for the French Church to continue to tie its fortunes to the unlikely dream of a monarchist restoration and distrusted the movement's tendency to defend the Catholic religion in merely utilitarian and nationalistic terms. Action Française never fully recovered from the denunciation, but it was active in the Vichy era.

== World War II and downfall ==
=== National government ===
Léon Blum was a French socialist politician and three-time Prime Minister of France. Although his two tenures in the 1930s were brief, his policies played a key role in French policy during the events leading up to World War II. As Prime Minister in the left-wing Popular Front government in 1936–1937, he provided a series of major economic and social reforms. Blum declared neutrality in the Spanish Civil War (1936–1939) to avoid the civil conflict spilling over into France itself. Once out of office in 1938, he denounced the appeasement of Germany. When Germany defeated France in 1940, he became a staunch opponent of Vichy France.

After the fall of the Blum government, Édouard Daladier became head of government on 10 April 1938, orienting his government towards the centre and ending the Popular Front. Along with Neville Chamberlain, Benito Mussolini and Adolf Hitler, Daladier signed the Munich Agreement in 1938, which gave Nazi Germany control over the Sudetenland. After Hitler's invasion of Poland in 1939, Britain and France declared war on Germany.

During the Phoney War, France's failure to aid Finland against the Soviet Union's invasion during the Winter War led to Daladier's resignation on 21 March 1940 and his replacement by Paul Reynaud. Daladier remained Minister of Defence until 19 May, when Reynaud took over the portfolio personally after the French defeat at Sedan.

Reynaud opposed the Munich Agreement of September 1938, when France and the United Kingdom gave way before Hitler's proposals for the dismemberment of Czechoslovakia. After the outbreak of World War II Reynaud became the penultimate Prime Minister of the Third Republic in March 1940. He was also vice-president of the Democratic Republican Alliance center-right party. Reynaud was Prime Minister during the German defeat of France in May and June 1940; he persistently refused to support an armistice with Germany, as premier in June 1940, he unsuccessfully attempted to save France from German occupation in World War II, and resigned on 16 June. After unsuccessfully attempting to flee France, he was arrested by Philippe Pétain's administration. Surrendering to German custody in 1942, he was imprisoned in Germany and later Austria until liberation in 1945, where he was released after the Battle of Itter Castle in which one of the leaders, German Major Josef Gangl, declared a hero by the Austrian resistance, took a sniper's bullet to save Reynaud.

=== Diplomatic situation with Nazi Germany ===
The most important factor in French foreign policy was the Remilitarization of the Rhineland on 7 March 1936 in defiance of the Treaty of Versailles, which had been declared to be a permanent demilitarized zone. With the Rhineland remilitarized, for the first time since 1918 German military forces could menace France directly, and equally importantly the Germans started to build the Siegfried line along the Franco-German border. The assumption behind the French alliance system in Eastern Europe was that the French Army would use the demilitarized status of the Rhineland to launch an offensive into western Germany if the Reich should invade any of France's allies in Eastern Europe, namely Poland, Czechoslovakia, Romania and Yugoslavia.

With the building of the Siegfried Line, it was possible for Germany to invade any of France's Eastern European allies with the majority of the Wehrmacht being sent east with the remainder of the Wehrmacht staying on the defensive in the Rhineland to halt any French offensive into Germany, a situation that boded ill for the survival of the French alliance system in Eastern Europe. A further complication for the French was the greater population of Germany as France could only field a third of the young men that the Reich could field along with the greater size of the German economy. To even the odds against the Reich, it was the unanimous opinion of all French foreign policy and military experts that France needed allies.

The nation that France wanted the most as an ally was Great Britain, which had the world's largest navy and provided that Britain made the "continental commitment" of sending another large expeditionary force to France like the BEF of the First World War would allow the French to face any challenge from Germany on more even terms. The need for the "continental commitment" allowed Britain to have a sort of veto power over French foreign policy in the interwar period as the French wanted the "continental commitment" very badly, and thus could not afford to alienate the British too much.

The other major ally the French wanted was the Soviet Union. However, the lack of a common German–Soviet frontier, the unwillingness of Romania and especially Poland to grant the Red Army transit rights, and the strong British dislike of the alliance that the French signed with the Soviet Union in 1935 all presented problems from the French viewpoint. Blum's foreign policy was one of attempting to improve relations with Germany to avoid a war while seeking to strengthen France's alliances and to conclude an alliance with Britain.

=== Munich agreement ===
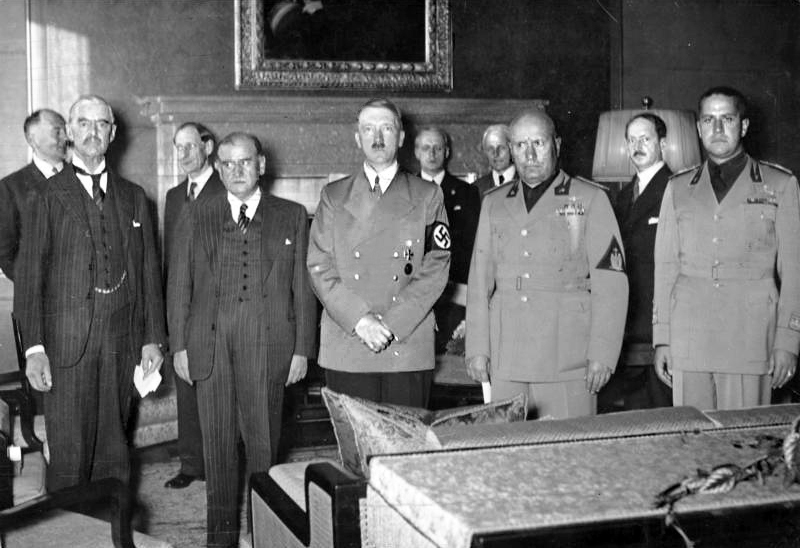
From left to right: Chamberlain, Daladier, Hitler, Mussolini and Ciano pictured before they sign the Munich Agreement, which gave the Czechoslovak border areas to Germany

Daladier's last government was in power at the time of the negotiations preceding the Munich Agreement during which France pressured Czechoslovakia to hand the Sudetenland to Nazi Germany. In April–May 1938, British Prime Minister Neville Chamberlain strongly but unsuccessfully pressed Daladier to renounce the French-Czechoslovak alliance, which led to Britain becoming involved in the crisis. From the British perspective, the problem was not the Sudetenland but the French-Czechoslovak alliance. British military experts were almost unanimous that Germany would defeat France in a war unless Britain intervened. The British thought that allowing Germany to defeat France would unacceptably alter the balance of power, and so Britain would have no choice but to intervene if a French-German war broke out.

The alliance would have turned any German attack on Czechoslovakia into a French–German war. As British Foreign Secretary Lord Halifax stated at a Cabinet meeting in March 1938, "Whether we liked or not, we had to admit the plain fact that we could not afford to see France overrun."

At the Anglo-French summit on 28–29 April 1938, Chamberlain pressured Daladier to renounce the alliance with Czechoslovakia, only to be firmly informed that France would stand by its obligations, which forced the British to be involved very reluctantly in the Sudetenland Crisis. The summit of 28–29 April 1938 represented a British "surrender" to the French, rather than a French "surrender" to the British since Daladier made it clear France would not renounce its alliance with Czechoslovakia.

Unlike Chamberlain, Daladier had no illusions about Hitler's ultimate goals. In fact, he told the British in a late April 1938 meeting that Hitler's real aim was to eventually secure "a domination of the Continent in comparison with which the ambitions of Napoleon were feeble".

Daladier went on to say, "Today, it is the turn of Czechoslovakia. Tomorrow, it will be the turn of Poland and Romania. When Germany has obtained the oil and wheat it needs, she will turn on the West. Certainly we must multiply our efforts to avoid war. But that will not be obtained unless Great Britain and France stick together, intervening in Prague for new concessions [i.e. to the Sudeten Germans] but declaring at the same time that they will safeguard the independence of Czechoslovakia. If, on the contrary, the Western Powers capitulate again, they will only precipitate the war they wish to avoid."

Despite being on the opposite sides of the ideological divide, starting on 14 April 1938 the Conservative MP Winston Churchill started a correspondence with Blum, sending him a series of letters written in his idiosyncratic French, encouraging him to support rearmament and oppose appeasement. During the Sudetenland crisis of 1938, Daladier accepted the offer of the British Prime Minister Neville Chamberlain to serve as an "honest broker" in an attempt to find a compromise. Chamberlain met with Adolf Hitler at a summit at Berchtesgaden where he agreed that the Sudetenland region of Czechoslovakia would be transferred to Germany. At a subsequent Anglo-German summit at Bad Godesberg, Hitler rejected Chamberlain's plan over a secondary issue as he demanded that the Sudetenland be transferred to Germany before 1 October 1938 while the Anglo-French plan called for a transfer to occur after 1 October. For a time in September 1938, it appeared that Europe was on brink of a war again. The fact that the issue at stake was only a secondary issue, namely the timetable for transferring the Sudetenland, after the primary issue had been settled struck many as bizarre.

The Munich Agreement that ended the crisis was a compromise as it was affirmed that the Sudetenland would be transferred to Germany but after only 1 October, albeit on a schedule that favored the German demand to have the Sudetenland "go home to the Reich" as soon as possible. When the Munich Agreement was signed on 30 September 1938, Blum wrote that he felt "soulagement honteux" ("shameful relief") as he wrote that he was happy that France would not be going to war with Germany, but he felt ashamed of an agreement that favored Germany at the expense of Czechoslovakia. On 1 October 1938, Blue wrote in Le Populaire: "There is not a woman and a man to refuse MM. Neville Chamberlain and Édouard Daladier their rightful tribute of gratitude. War is avoided. The scourge recedes. Life can become natural again. One can resume one's work and sleep again. One can enjoy the beauty of an autumn sun. How would it be possible for me not to understand this sense of deliverance when I feel it myself?"

Blum's contorted position of voting for the Munich Agreement, but being opposed to further appeasement was largely an attempt to hold together the Socialists. In the months that followed, Blum became more critical of the "men of Munich". The principal object of his criticism was not Daladier—whom he knew to be a reluctant appeaser—but rather the Foreign Minister, Georges Bonnet. Bonnet was known to be the advocate of some sort of Franco-German understanding under which France would recognize Eastern Europe as being in the German sphere of influence and abandon all of France's allies in Eastern Europe. Blum focused his criticism on Bonnet as the main advocate of appeasement in the cabinet.

=== Military and diplomatic policies ===
In an attempt to improve productivity in the French armament industry, especially its aviation industry, the Finance Minister Paul Reynaud, supported by Daladier, brought in a series of sweeping laws that undid much of the Popular Front's economic policies, most notably ending the 48 hour work week. Blum joined forces with the Communists in opposing the Daladier government's economic policies, and supported the general strike called by the Communists on 30 November 1938. Daladier called out the French Army to operate essential services and had the French police use tear gas to evict striking workers at the Renault works. The use of the military to operate essential services while sending out the police to arrest the strike leaders broke the general strike. In a speech, Blum accused Daladier of using repressive methods to crush the French working class and revert France back to the pre-1936 economic system.

Complicating matters was the beginning of a major crisis in Italo-French relations. On 30 November 1938 – the same day as the general strike – a carefully staged "spontaneous" demonstration organized by the Italian Foreign Minister Count Galeazzo Ciano took place in the Italian Chamber of Deputies where on cue all of the deputies rose up to shout "Tunis, Corsica, Nice, Savoy!" Benito Mussolini had intended to use what he called "Sudeten methods" on France as the Italian media started a violent anti-French campaign demanding that France cede Corsica, Nice, Savoy and Tunisia to Italy.

Daladier responded with a series of resolute speeches on French radio where he rejected all of the Italian demands, which won him much popularity in France. From the viewpoint of Blum, being opposed to Daladier at a time when he won himself many accolades as the defender of France's territorial integrity against Italy was politically difficult. At the next session of the Chambre des députés on 9 December 1938, the Popular Front formally came to an end as Daladier chose to base his majority of the parties of the right and center. Despite the end of the Popular Front, Blum did not press for a vote of no-confidence or new elections. Blum believed that Daladier would win an election if one was called, and the Socialists did not vote for a Communist motion of no-confidence in the Daladier government.

=== Strategic missteps ===
When war was declared in 1939, Maurice Gamelin was France's commander in chief, with his headquarters at the Château de Vincennes, a facility completely devoid of telephonic or any other electronic links to his commanders in the field: a massive oversight in the face of the Wehrmacht's subsequent swift and flexible 'Blitzkrieg' tactics. France saw little action during the Phoney War, apart from a few French divisions crossing the German border in the Saar Offensive, who advanced a mere 8 km (5.0 mi). They stopped even before reaching Germany's unfinished Siegfried Line. According to General Siegfried Westphal, a German staff officer on the Western Front, if France had attacked in September 1939 German forces could not have held out for more than one or two weeks. Gamelin ordered his troops back behind the Maginot Line, but only after telling France's ally, Poland, that France had broken the Siegfried Line and that help was on its way. Before the war, he had expected the Polish Army to hold out against Germany for six months.

Gamelin prohibited any bombing of the industrial areas of the Ruhr, in case the Germans retaliated. The French mobilisation had called up many essential workers, which disrupted vital French industries in the first weeks of the campaign. Gamelin's vision for France's defence was based upon a static defence along the Franco-German border, which was reinforced by the Maginot Line. However, the Line did not extend along the Belgian frontier. During the winter of 1939–40, which was one of the coldest of the 20th century, work on the extension of the Line along the Belgian frontier was slow and not of the same quality as the original defences. Gamelin, along with many other members of the French High Command, saw the Ardennes as unlikely to be attacked and chose to defend it with only ten reserve divisions and few fortifications. Much of the French army was posted further northwest along the Belgian frontier. According to General Hasso von Manteuffel, a German Panzer commander, France had more and better tanks than Germany, but chose to disperse them.

Gamelin's own views had changed from a purely defensive strategy relying on the Maginot Line. French strategists predicted a German drive across northern Belgium, as in 1914. Gamelin favoured an aggressive advance northward to meet the attacking German forces in Belgium and the Netherlands, as far removed from French territory as possible. This strategy, known as the Dyle Plan, fitted with Belgian defensive plans and also with British objectives. Gamelin committed much of the motorised forces of the French Army and the entire British Expeditionary Force (BEF) to this strategy. Such a strategy also meant that most of the French Army would leave its one-year-old prepared defensive positions in northern France to be committed to joining battle on an unknown Belgian defensive line.

Despite reports of the build-up of German forces, and even knowing the date of the planned German attack, Gamelin did nothing until May 1940, stating that he would "await events". Then, when the Germans attacked, Gamelin insisted on moving 40 of his best divisions, including the BEF, northwards to conform to the Dyle Plan.

In the first few days of the Battle of Belgium, many Allied aircraft were attacked while still on the ground. The rest of the air support was concentrated on the French advance, rather than attacking the exposed 150 km (93 mi) column supplying the German advance. Quickly, the French and the British became fearful of being outflanked and they withdrew from the defensive lines drawn up across Belgium. They did not pull back fast enough to prevent them being outflanked by the German Panzer divisions.

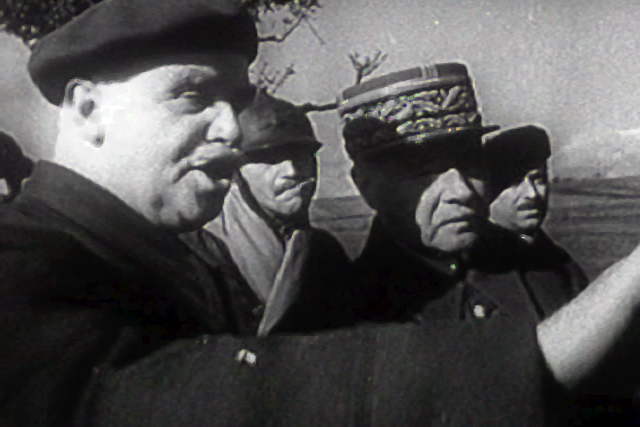
Gamelin (in kepi) seen in Frank Capra's film Divide and Conquer

The German wing that attacked further south was able to cross the River Meuse faster than anticipated, aided by heavy Luftwaffe aerial bombardment. Although almost all the crossings over the Meuse were destroyed by the French, one weir 60 km (37 mi) north of Sedan had been left intact and was only lightly defended. It was thus quickly captured and exploited by the Germans. Meanwhile, French guns were ordered to limit their firing in case they ran out of ammunition. German Colonel-General Heinz Guderian disregarded his orders, and attacked aggressively on this front.

In response, Gamelin withdrew forces in this area so that they could defend Paris, thinking this was the Germans' objective, rather than the coast.

=== Downfall of the Third Republic ===
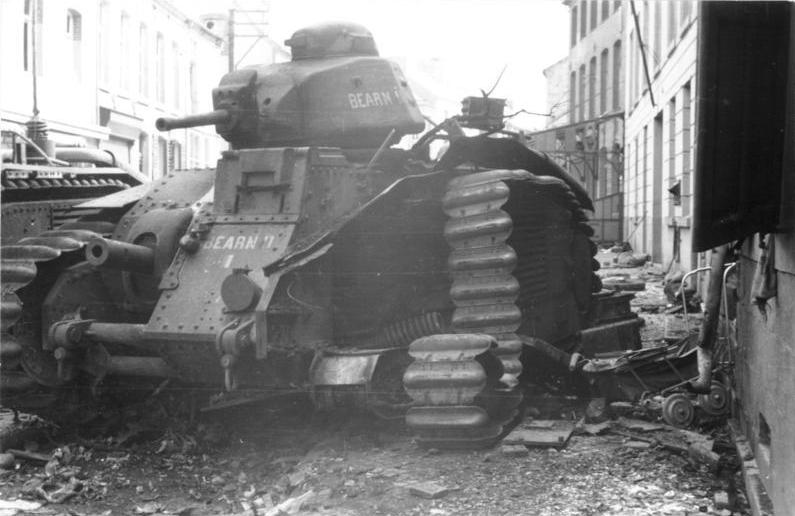
French Char B1 tank destroyed in 1940

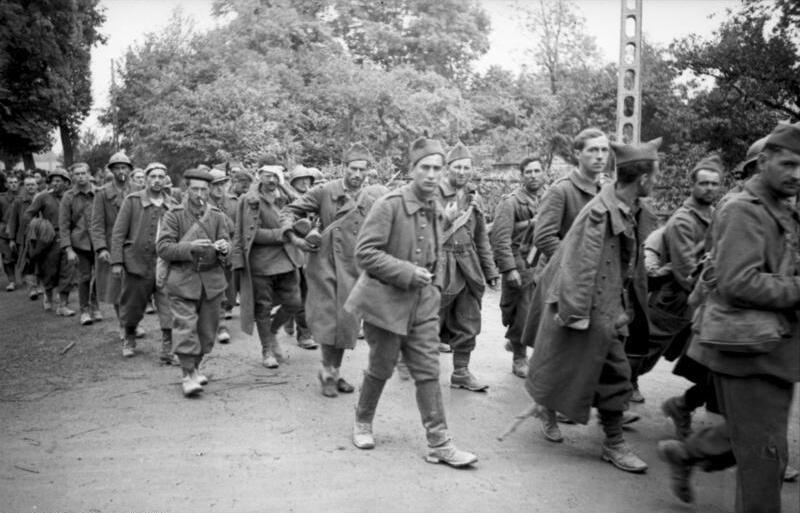
French soldiers marching into German captivity, June 1940

The looming threat to France of Nazi Germany was delayed at the Munich Conference of 1938. France and Great Britain abandoned Czechoslovakia and appeased the Germans by giving in to their demands concerning the acquisition of the Sudetenland (the portions of Czechoslovakia with German-speaking majorities). Intensive rearmament programs began in 1936 and were re-doubled in 1938, but they would only bear fruit in 1939 and 1940.

Historians have debated two themes regarding the sudden collapse of the French government in 1940. One emphasizes a broad cultural and political interpretation, pointing to failures, internal dissension, and a sense of malaise that ran through all French society. A second one blames the poor military planning by the French High Command. According to the British historian Julian Jackson, the Dyle Plan conceived by French General Maurice Gamelin was destined for failure, since it drastically miscalculated the ensuing attack by German Army Group B into central Belgium. The Dyle Plan embodied the primary war plan of the French Army to stave off Wehrmacht Army Groups A, B, and C with their much revered Panzer divisions in the Low Countries. As the French 1st, 7th, 9th armies and the British Expeditionary Force moved in Belgium to meet Army Group B, the German Army Group A outflanked the Allies at the Battle of Sedan of 1940 by coming through the Ardennes, a broken and heavily forested terrain that had been believed to be impassable to armoured units. The Germans also rushed along the Somme valley toward the English Channel coast to catch the Allies in a large pocket that forced them into the disastrous Battle of Dunkirk. As a result of this brilliant German strategy, embodied in the Manstein Plan, the Allies were defeated in stunning fashion. France had to accept the terms imposed by Adolf Hitler at the Second Armistice at Compiègne, which was signed on 22 June 1940 in the same railway carriage in which the Germans had signed the armistice that ended the First World War on 11 November 1918.

On 10 July 1940 the French parliament gave full powers to Marshal Philippe Pétain.He proclaimed in the following days the État Français (the "French State"), commonly known as the "Vichy Regime" or "Vichy France" following its re-location to the town of Vichy in central France. His rival Charles de Gaulle made the Appeal of 18 June, exhorting the French to not accept defeat, and to rally to Free France and continue the fight with the Allies.

The Third Republic "surreptitiously disappeared", Jackson wrote. Vichy never officially ended the Third Republic; Pétain never promulgated a new constitution, and Vichy always remained a provisional government. The former government was so discredited, however, that even de Gaulle said he fought for "honor and country" instead of the republic.

== Historiography ==
=== Interpreting the Third Republic ===
Throughout its seventy-year history, the Third Republic stumbled from crisis to crisis, from dissolved parliaments to the appointment of a mentally ill president (Paul Deschanel). It fought bitterly through the First World War against the German Empire, and the inter-war years saw much political strife with a growing rift between the right and the left. When France was liberated in 1944, few called for a restoration of the Third Republic, and a Constituent Assembly was established by the government of a provisional French Republic to draft a constitution for a successor, established as the Fourth Republic (1946 to 1958) that December, a parliamentary system not unlike the Third Republic.

Adolphe Thiers, first president of the Third Republic, called republicanism in the 1870s "the form of government that divides France least." France might have agreed about being a republic, but it never fully accepted the Third Republic. France's longest-lasting governmental system since before the 1789 Revolution, the Third Republic was consigned to the history books as being unloved and unwanted in the end. Yet, its longevity showed that it was capable of weathering many storms, particularly the First World War.

One of the most surprising aspects of the Third Republic was that it constituted the first stable republican government in French history and the first to win the support of the majority of the population, but it was intended as an interim, temporary government. Following Thiers's example, most of the Orleanist monarchists progressively rallied themselves to the Republican institutions, thus giving support of a large part of the elites to the Republican form of government. On the other hand, the Legitimists remained harshly anti-Republicans, while Charles Maurras founded the Action française in 1898. This far-right monarchist movement became influential in the Quartier Latin in the 1930s. It also became a model for various far right leagues that participated to the 6 February 1934 riots that toppled the Second Cartel des gauches government.

=== Historiography of decadence ===
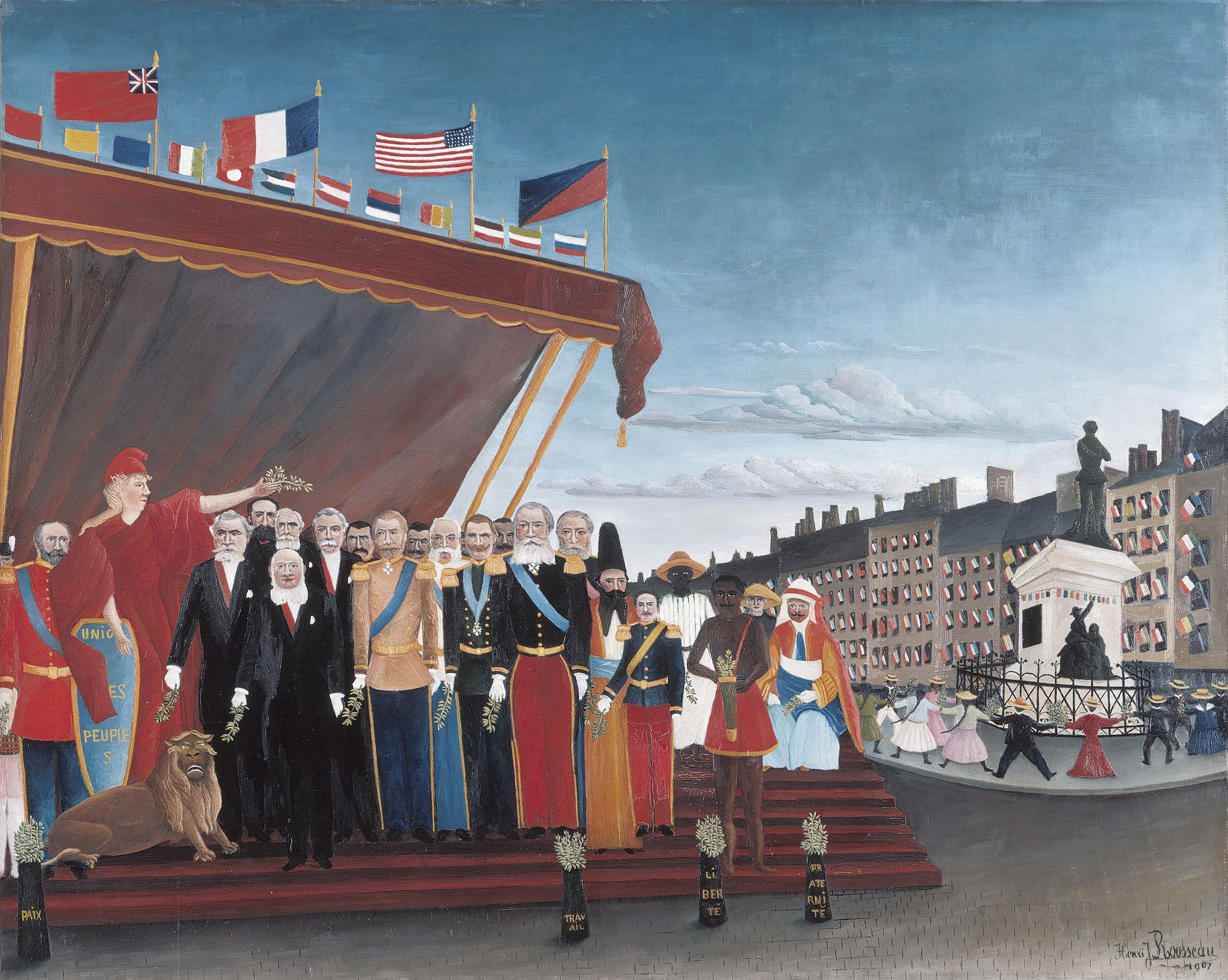
The Representatives of Foreign Powers Coming to Greet the Republic as a Sign of Peace, 1907 painting by Henri Rousseau

The topic of the "decadence" of French institutions and France arose as a historiographical debate at the end of the Second Empire and was a recurring theme of debate during the Third Republic. Each defeat, setback, or national humiliation served to confirm the idea, as France lost its vital essence or even will to exist, while energetic young countries like the United States appeared to be on the upsurge, France and old world civilization appeared in stasis or on a slow decline, according to this thesis. It first made its appearance in the somewhat bizarre and now obscure writings of Claude-Marie Raudot, who was hostile to First and Second Empire, and wrote that France was living and wished to live in a world of illusion. Raudot pointed out the declining birth rate, falling below replacement level, which he considered a cancerous symptom of the national malaise, foretelling an inevitable national decline, while the Russians and the Americans pushed ahead as seen in de Tocqueville's writings, and even Brazil was seen as a future rising star.

Proponents of the concept have argued that the French defeat of 1940 was caused by what they regard as the innate decadence and moral rot of France. The notion of la décadence as an explanation for the defeat began almost as soon as the armistice was signed in June 1940. Marshal Philippe Pétain stated in one radio broadcast, "The regime led the country to ruin." In another, he said "Our defeat is punishment for our moral failures" that France had "rotted" under the Third Republic. In 1942 the Riom Trial was held bringing several leaders of the Third Republic to trial for declaring war on Germany in 1939 and accusing them of not doing enough to prepare France for war.

John Gunther in 1940, before the defeat of France, reported that the Third Republic ("the reductio ad absurdum of democracy") had had 103 cabinets with an average length of eight months, and that 15 former prime ministers were living. Marc Bloch in his book Strange Defeat (written in 1940, and published posthumously in 1946) argued that the French upper classes had ceased to believe in the greatness of France following the Popular Front victory of 1936, and so had allowed themselves to fall under the spell of fascism and defeatism. Bloch said that the Third Republic suffered from a deep internal "rot" that generated bitter social tensions, unstable governments, pessimism and defeatism, fearful and incoherent diplomacy, hesitant and shortsighted military strategy, and, finally, facilitated German victory in June 1940. The French journalist André Géraud, who wrote under the pen name Pertinax in his 1943 book, The Gravediggers of France indicted the pre-war leadership for what he regarded as total incompetence.

After 1945, the concept of la décadence was widely embraced by different French political fractions as a way of discrediting their rivals. The French Communist Party blamed the defeat on the "corrupt" and "decadent" capitalist Third Republic (conveniently hiding its own sabotaging of the French war effort during the Nazi-Soviet Pact and its opposition to the "imperialist war" against Germany in 1939–40).

From a different perspective, Gaullists called the Third Republic a "weak" regime and argued that if France had a regime headed by a strong-man president like Charles de Gaulle before 1940, the defeat could have been avoided. In power, they did exactly that and started the Fifth Republic. Then was a group of French historians, centered around Pierre Renouvin and his protégés Jean-Baptiste Duroselle and Maurice Baumont, that started a new type of international history to take into what Renouvin called forces profondes (profound forces) such as the influence of domestic politics on foreign policy. However, Renouvin and his followers still followed the concept of la décadence with Renouvin arguing that French society under the Third Republic was "sorely lacking in initiative and dynamism" and Baumont arguing that French politicians had allowed "personal interests" to override "any sense of the general interest".

In 1979, Duroselle published a well-known book entitled La Décadence that offered a total condemnation of the entire Third Republic as weak, cowardly and degenerate. Even more so then in France, the concept of la décadence was accepted in the English-speaking world, where British historians such A. J. P. Taylor often described the Third Republic as a tottering regime on the verge of collapse.

A notable example of the la décadence thesis was William L. Shirer's 1969 book The Collapse of the Third Republic, where the French defeat is explained as the result of the moral weakness and cowardice of the French leaders.Shirer portrayed Édouard Daladier as a well-meaning, but weak willed; Georges Bonnet as a corrupt opportunist even willing to do a deal with the Nazis; Marshal Maxime Weygand as a reactionary soldier more interested in destroying the Third Republic than in defending it; General Maurice Gamelin as incompetent and defeatist, Pierre Laval as a crooked crypto-fascist; Charles Maurras (whom Shirer represented as France's most influential intellectual) as the preacher of "drivel"; Marshal Philippe Pétain as the senile puppet of Laval and the French royalists, and Paul Reynaud as a petty politician controlled by his mistress, Countess Hélène de Portes. Modern historians who subscribe to la décadence argument or take a very critical view of France's pre-1940 leadership without necessarily subscribing to la décadence thesis include Talbot Imlay, Anthony Adamthwaite, Serge Berstein, Michael Carely, Nicole Jordan, Igor Lukes, and Richard Crane.

The first historian to denounce la décadence concept explicitly was the Canadian historian Robert J. Young, who, in his 1978 book In Command of France argued that French society was not decadent, that the defeat of 1940 was due to only military factors, not moral failures, and that the Third Republic's leaders had done their best under the difficult conditions of the 1930s. Young argued that the decadence, if it existed, did not impact French military planning and readiness to fight. Young finds that American reporters in the late 1930s portrayed a calm, united, competent, and confident France. They praised French art, music, literature, theatre, and fashion, and stressed French resilience and pluck in the face of growing Nazi aggression and brutality. Nothing in the tone or content of the articles foretold the crushing military defeat and collapse of June 1940.

Young has been followed by other historians such as Robert Frankenstein, Jean-Pierre Azema, Jean-Louis Crémieux-Brilhac, Martin Alexander, Eugenia C. Kiesling, and Martin Thomas, who argued that French weakness on the international stage was due to structural factors as the impact of the Great Depression had on French rearmament and had nothing to do with French leaders being too "decadent" and cowardly to stand up to Nazi Germany.

== Timeline to 1914 ==
- September 1870: following the collapse of the Empire of Napoleon III in the Franco-Prussian War, the Third Republic was created and the Government of National Defence ruled during the Siege of Paris (19 September 1870 – 28 January 1871).
- May 1871: The Treaty of Frankfurt (1871), the peace treaty ending the Franco-Prussian War. France lost Alsace and most of Lorraine, and had to pay a cash indemnity to the new nation of Germany.
- 1871: The Paris Commune. In a formal sense, the Paris Commune of 1871 was simply the local authority that exercised power in Paris for two months in the spring of 1871. It was separate from that of the new government under Adolphe Thiers. The regime came to an end after a bloody suppression by Thiers's government in May 1871.
- 1872–73: After the nation faced the immediate political problems, it needed to establish a permanent form of government. Thiers wanted to base it on the constitutional monarchy of Britain, however he realized France would have to remain republican. In expressing this belief, he violated the Pact of Bordeaux, angering the Monarchists in the Assembly. As a result, he was forced to resign in 1873.
- 1873: Marshal Patrice de MacMahon, a conservative Roman Catholic, was made President of the Republic. Albert de Broglie, the Orleanist duc de Broglie, became prime minister. Unintentionally, the Monarchists had replaced an absolute monarchy by a parliamentary one.
- Feb 1875: Series of parliamentary Acts established the organic or constitutional laws of the new republic. At its apex was a President of the Republic. A two-chamber parliament was created, along with a ministry under the President of the Council, who was nominally answerable to both the President of the Republic and Parliament.
- May 1877: with public opinion swinging heavily in favour of a republic, the President of the Republic, Patrice de MacMahon, himself a monarchist, made one last desperate attempt to salvage the monarchical cause by dismissing the republic-minded Prime Minister Jules Simon and reappointing the monarchist leader Albert de Broglie to office. He then dissolved parliament and called a general election. If his hope had been to halt the move towards republicanism, it backfired spectacularly, with the President being accused of having staged a constitutional coup d'état, known as le seize Mai after the date when it happened.
- 1879: Republicans returned triumphant, finally killing off the prospect of a restored French monarchy by gaining control of the Senate on 5 January 1879. MacMahon himself resigned on 30 January 1879, leaving a seriously weakened presidency in the shape of Jules Grévy.
- 1880: The Jesuits and several other religious orders were dissolved, and their members were forbidden to teach in state schools.
- 1881: Following the 16 May crisis in 1877, Legitimists were pushed out of power, and the Republic was finally governed by republicans, called Opportunist Republicans as they were in favour of moderate changes to firmly establish the new regime. The Jules Ferry laws on free, mandatory and secular public education, voted in 1881 and 1882, were one of the first sign of this republican control of the Republic, as public education was not any more in the exclusive control of the Catholic congregations.
- 1882: Religious instruction was removed from all state schools. The measures were accompanied by the abolition of chaplains in the armed forces and the removal of nuns from hospitals. Due to the fact that France was mainly Roman Catholic, this was greatly opposed.
- 1889: The Republic was rocked by the sudden but short-timed Boulanger crisis, spawning the rise of the modern intellectual Émile Zola. Later, the Panama scandals also were quickly criticized by the press.
- 1893: Following anarchist Auguste Vaillant's bombing at the National Assembly, killing nobody but injuring one, deputies voted the lois scélérates which limited the 1881 freedom of the press laws. The following year, President Sadi Carnot was stabbed to death by Italian anarchist Caserio.
- 1894: The Dreyfus Affair: a Jewish artillery officer, Alfred Dreyfus, was arrested on charges relating to conspiracy and espionage. Allegedly, Dreyfus had handed over important military documents discussing the designs of a new French artillery piece to a German military attaché named Max von Schwartzkoppen.
- 1894: The Franco-Russian Alliance was formed.
- 1898: Writer Émile Zola published an article entitled J'Accuse...! The article alleged an antisemitic conspiracy in the highest ranks of the military to scapegoat Dreyfus, tacitly supported by the government and the Catholic Church. The Fashoda Incident nearly causes an Anglo-French war.
- 1901: The Radical-Socialist Party is founded and remained the most important party of the Third Republic starting at the end of the 19th century. The same year, followers of Léon Gambetta, such as Raymond Poincaré, who became President of the Council in the 1920s, created the Democratic Republican Alliance (ARD), which became the main center-right party after World War I and the parliamentary disappearance of monarchists and Bonapartists.
- 1904: French foreign minister Théophile Delcassé negotiated the Entente Cordiale with the British Foreign Secretary, Lord Lansdowne, in 1904.
- 1905: The government introduced the law on the separation of Church and State, heavily supported by Emile Combes, who had been strictly enforcing the 1901 voluntary association law and the 1904 law on religious congregations' freedom of teaching (more than 2,500 private teaching establishments were by then closed by the state, causing bitter opposition from the Catholic and conservative population).
- 1906: It became apparent that the documents handed over to Schwartzkoppen by Dreyfus in 1894 were a forgery and Dreyfus was exonerated after previously being pardoned after serving 5 years in prison.
- 1914: After SFIO (French Section of the Workers' International) leader Jean Jaurès's assassination a few days before the German invasion of Belgium, the French socialist movement, as the whole of the Second International, abandoned its antimilitarist positions and joined the national war effort. The First World War begins.

== See also ==
- Belle Époque, 1871–1914
  - Paris in the Belle Époque
- Interwar France, 1919–1939
- Economic history of France#1789–1914
- Economic history of France#1914–1944
- Women in France
- French colonial empire
  - List of French possessions and colonies
  - French Africa
- French presidential elections under the Third Republic
- France in the long nineteenth century
- History of France (1900 to present)
- Freemasonry under the Second French Empire
- Purge of the French Civil Service (1879-1884)
- French anti-Southern sentiment during the Third Republic
- Nomination of Mayors under the French Third Republic
- Proclamation of the French Republic (September 4, 1870)
- Freemasonry in the French Third Republic
- Bourbon-Orléanist Restoration Project
- History of Savoy from 1860 to 1914
- French Republican Left (1871–1885)
