= List of tariffs in France =

This is a list of French tariffs.

- 1806: Continental System
- 1860: Cobden–Chevalier Treaty
- 1881: French tariff of 1881
- 1885: French tariff of 1885
- 1887: French tariff of 1887
- 1892: Méline tariff
- 1968: European Economic Community (Common External Tariff completed 1 July)
