= List of tariffs =

This is a list of tariffs and trade legislation:

- List of tariffs in Canada
- List of tariffs in France
- List of tariffs in Germany
- List of tariffs in Pakistan
- List of tariffs in the United Kingdom
- List of tariffs in the United States
