= French peasants =

Largest socioeconomic class until the mid-1900s

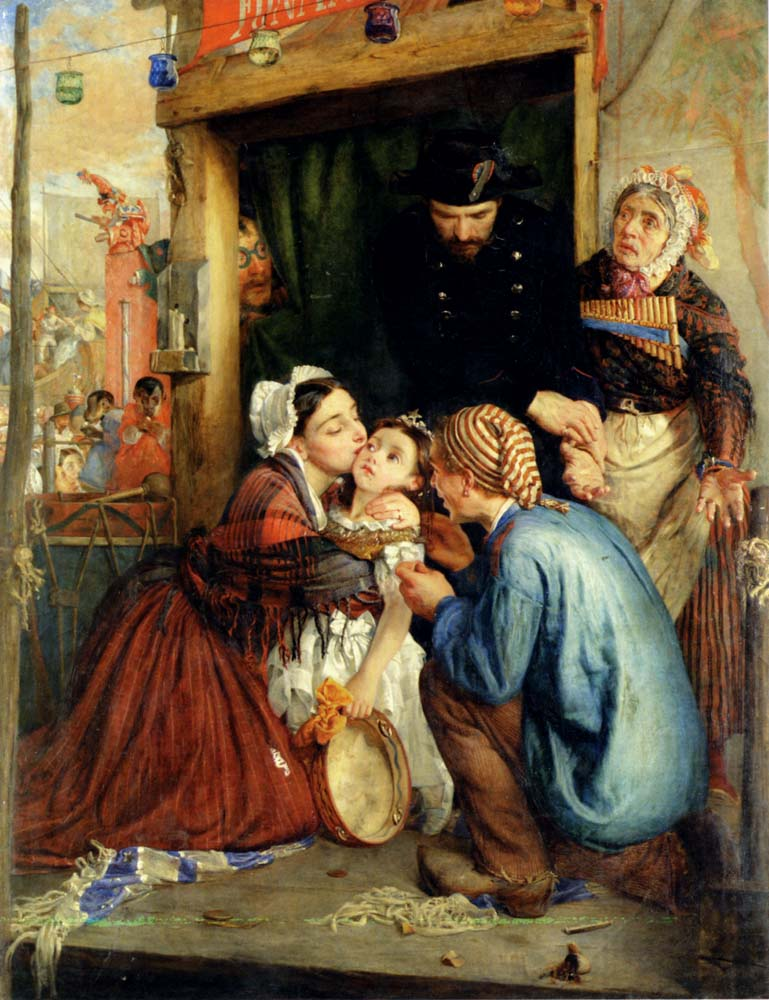
Philip Calderon "French Peasants Finding Their Stolen Child"; 1859

French peasants were the largest socio-economic group in France until the mid-20th century. The word peasant, while having no universally accepted meaning, is used here to describe those who practiced subsistence farming throughout the Middle Ages, often smallholders or those paying rent to landlords, and rural workers in general. As industrialization developed, some peasants became wealthier than others and drove investment in agriculture. Rising inequality and financial management in France during the late 18th century eventually motivated peasants to revolt and destroy the feudal system. Today peasants could no longer be said to exist as an economic or social group in France, although many attempts have been made to honor and preserve their supposed traditional way of life.

== 1500 to 1780s ==
By the middle of the 16th century, France's demographic growth, its increased demand for consumer goods, and its rapid influx of gold and silver from Africa and the Americas led to inflation (grain became five times as expensive from 1520 to 1600), and wage stagnation. Although many richer land-owning peasants and enterprising merchants had been able to grow rich during the boom, the standard of living fell greatly for poor rural peasants, who were forced to deal with bad harvests at the same time. This led to reduced purchasing power and a decline in manufacturing. The monetary crisis led France to abandon (in 1577) the livre as its money of account, in favor of the écu in circulation, and banning most foreign currencies.

Meanwhile, France's military ventures in Italy and (later) disastrous civil wars demanded huge sums of cash, which were raised with through the taille and other taxes. The taille, which was levied mainly on the peasantry, increased from 2.5 million livres in 1515 to 6 million after 1551, and by 1589 the taille had reached a record 21 million livres. Financial crises hit the royal household repeatedly, and so in 1523, Francis I established a government bond system in Paris, the "rentes sure l'Hôtel de Ville".

In the 17th century rich peasants who had ties to the market economy provided much of the capital investment necessary for agricultural growth, and frequently moved from village to village (or town). Geographic mobility, directly tied to the market and the need for investment capital, was the main path to social mobility. The "stable" core of French society, town guildspeople and village laborers, included cases of staggering social and geographic continuity, but even this core required regular renewal. Accepting the existence of these two societies, the constant tension between them, and extensive geographic and social mobility tied to a market economy holds the key to a clearer understanding of the evolution of the social structure, economy, and even political system of early modern France. Collins (1991) argues that the Annales School paradigm underestimated the role of the market economy; failed to explain the nature of capital investment in the rural economy, and grossly exaggerated social stability.

== 1748 to 1789: Politicization and Changing Public Attitudes, Pre-Revolution ==
Before mid-century, in France, most peasants lived their day-to-day lives without engaging themselves politically. Things changed after a major regional conflict; the War of the Austrian Succession, which France fought to keep Prussia from claiming Habsburg lands (unsuccessfully). It was an expensive, drawn-out, and confusing war for ordinary French citizens. The French did not make meaningful territorial gains and instead, indebted themselves further (leading to higher taxes for peasants). News about the result of the war led to wide controversy surrounding French interests and about the presence of misinformation coming from the crown. People began to pay closer attention, forming their own opinions on governmental affairs.

The situation worsened dramatically after the result of the Seven Years' War (1756-1763). The French suffered the loss of almost all their territories in North America, humiliating the monarchy, and doubling the nation’s debt. The government tried to recoup the cost by creating new tax policies on land and income (which targeted commoners while excluding nobles), enforcement of unpaid/mandatory labor programs, and forced purchase of inflated goods (mainly salt). Pamphlets like the Richesse de l’Etat (1764) critiqued the way the tax system was being managed, placing the blame on a lack of fiscal equity, transparency, and a partiality to the interests and well-being of the second and first estates. “The expensive, and unjust system of taxation should be replaced by a single tax on wealth, which would be apportioned among the top two million property owners according to a graduated scale.”

New attitudes and opinions like these can be largely attributed to the expansion of political thought influenced by the ideals of the Enlightenment Period. Publications, particularly the Encyclopédie, developed a public that questioned authority, demanded reform, and valued reason over tradition. These ideas created backlash from the government: ""On April 16, 1757, the Crown decreed that anyone who published anything that merely tended to “stir up spirits” (“émouvoir les esprits”) would be executed."". Censorship campaigns like this added to distrust in the monarchy, framing it as tyrannical and untrustworthy.

This distrust in the crown only grew after public scandals, like in the case of Guillaume Kornmann, who was victimized by a French official through an affair with his wife. This tugged at the heartstrings of the common people, who pinned the blame on a corrupt government. Louis XVI’s attacks on venal offices through Chancellor Maupeou’s reforms (1771) undermined the independent judiciary (even with its existing flaws). The falling credibility and legitimacy of the monarchy stemmed from issues like these, which were now exploding in front of a public that was politically aware and ready to enact change.

Peasants increasingly understood their grievances as systemic rather than local and began to see the monarchy as responsible for their suffering. When the fiscal crisis of the late 1780s forced the Crown to call the Estates General, peasants were prepared not only to articulate their grievances but also to act. The politicization that unfolded between 1748 and 1789 laid the groundwork for peasant participation in the French Revolution and for the radical challenge to feudal authority that followed.

== 1789–1945 ==
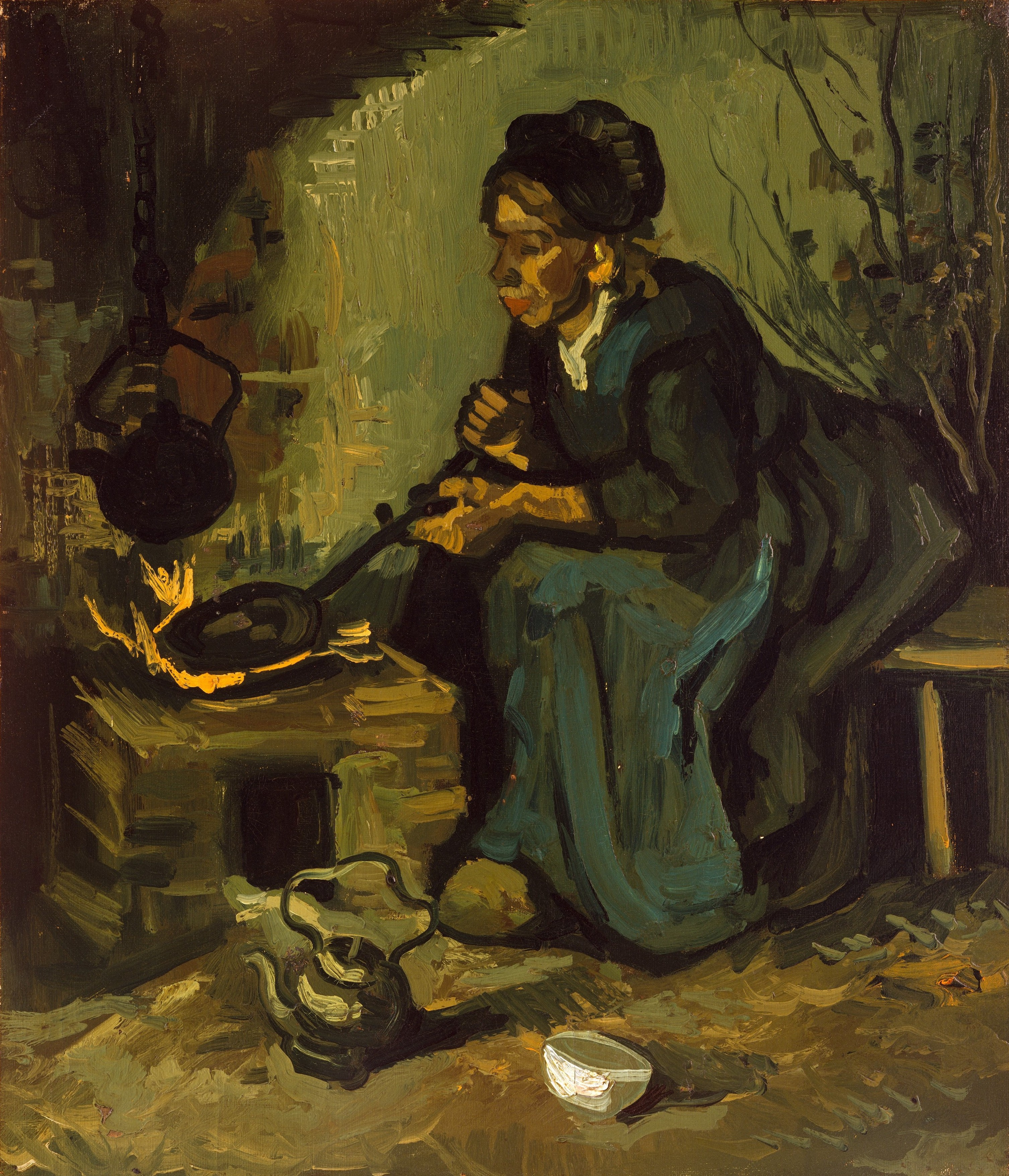
"A Peasant Woman Cooking by a Fireplace"; by Vincent van Gogh; 1885

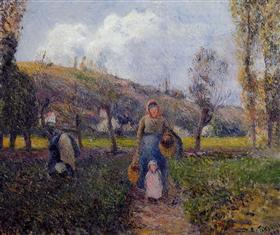
"A Peasant Woman and Child Harvesting the Fields"; Camille Pissarro; 1882

France faced a series of major economic crises after 1770. Because of very expensive wars, and inadequate financial system, the government was virtually bankrupt. From the point of view of the peasants, rapid population growth, harvest failures, physiocratic calls for modernization of agriculture, and rising seigneurial dues motivated peasants to destroy feudalism in France. They played a major role in starting the French Revolution in 1789. However most quickly retired from active political involvement. Karl Marx argued that the “allotment farmer” lacked political unity due to the sheer local nature of their lives. Napoleon I was widely popular. The Second Republic was widely resented for imposing high taxes, most notorious among them the 45 centime tax.

=== 19th century modernization of peasants ===
France was a rural nation as late as 1940, but a major change took place after railways started arriving in the 1850s–60s. In his seminal book Peasants into Frenchmen (1976), historian Eugen Weber traced the modernization of French villages and argued that rural France went from backward and isolated to modern and possessing a sense of French nationhood during the late 19th and early 20th centuries. He emphasized the roles of railroads, republican schools, and universal military conscription. He based his findings on school records, migration patterns, military service documents and economic trends. Weber argued that until 1900 or so a sense of French nationhood was weak in the provinces. Weber then looked at how the policies of the Third Republic created a sense of French nationality in rural areas. The book was widely praised, but was criticized by some, such as Ted W. Margadant, who argued that a sense of Frenchness already existed in the provinces before 1870.

=== Protectionism ===
After a period of free trade under Napoleon III and the early Third Republic, French national policy became more protectionist with regard to agricultural products, to protect the very large agricultural population, especially through the Méline tariff of 1892. France maintained two forms of agriculture: a modern, mechanized, capitalistic system in the Northeast, and in the rest of the country a reliance on subsistence agriculture on very small farms with low income levels.

In 1884 unions were legalised which in the countryside allowed for the creation of syndicats agricoles representing farmers. At first this led to the setting up of gentry-led unions (called the syndicalisme des ducs).

== Since 1945 ==
Modernization of the traditional/subsistence farming sector began in the 1940s, and resulted in a rapid depopulation of rural France, although protectionist measures remained national policy. With government support, younger, more active farmers bought out their neighbors, enlarged their properties, and used the latest in mechanization, new seeds, fertilizers, and new techniques. The result was a revolution in agricultural output, as well as a sharply reduced number of active farmers from 7.4 million in 1946 to only 2 million in 1975. It also resulted in millions of empty old farm houses. They were promptly purchased and upgraded by Frenchmen who wanted a rural retreat away from the frenzy of their primary work in the cities. Many did this out of nostalgia about family memories of rural living that drew the city dwellers back to the countryside. By 1978, France was the world leader in per capita ownership of second homes and L’Express reported an "irresistible infatuation of the French for the least Norman thatched house, Cévenol sheep barn or the most modest Provençal farmhouse."

Numerous organizations since the 1930s have emerged to preserve and enhance the position of the small farm in France, with a wide range of ideological approaches from far left to far right. They all seek to honor the tradition and fund the surviving farmers, and mobilize their political support.

The media became deeply involved, especially the postwar French film industry. Film depicted the exodus from countryside to city as a threat to France's historic role as a traditional, agrarian society. Documentaries celebrated the enormous power of modern machinery and electrification, while fictional dramas portrayed the joy of city dwellers who returned to the wholesome atmosphere of the country.

== See also ==
- Economic history of France
- History of France
- Peasant
- Peasants' War (1798), revolt in 1798 against the French occupiers of the Southern Netherlands
- Siege of Malta (1798–1800). which began as a peasant uprising against French rule in 1798
