= Economic history of France =

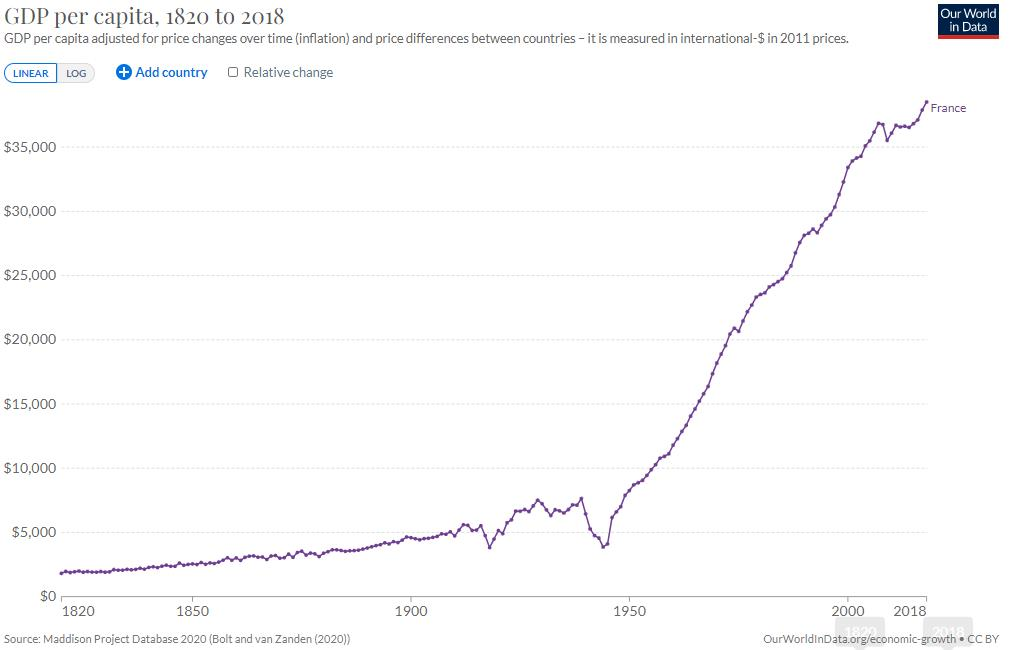
Change in per capita GDP of France, 1820–2018. Figures are inflation-adjusted to 2011 international dollars.

The economic history of France involves major events and trends, including the elaboration and extension of the seigneurial economic system (including the enserfment of peasants) in the medieval Kingdom of France, the development of the French colonial empire in the early modern period, the wide-ranging reforms of the French Revolution and the Napoleonic Era, the competition with the United Kingdom and other neighboring states during industrialization and the extension of imperialism, the total wars of the late-19th and early 20th centuries, and the introduction of the welfare state and integration with the European Union since World War II.

Medieval and early modern France experienced periods of economic growth, as well as challenges such as wars, plagues, and social inequality. The economy relied heavily on agriculture, trade, and the production of luxury goods, and the power and influence of the monarchy played a significant role in shaping economic policies and development. In the late 18th century, French industries faced challenges from competition with England, leading to an industrial depression. The American War of Independence had mixed effects on trade, while the French economy experienced setbacks, including agricultural price reductions and debt accumulation.

France experienced a mix of growth, stagnation, and setbacks during the period from 1789 to 1914. It faced economic challenges related to the French Revolution, Napoleonic wars, protectionism, and industrialization. While France made some advancements in banking and finance, it fell behind other nations in terms of industrial development. Colonialism played a complex role in France's economic and geopolitical landscape. While it provided economic benefits and resources, it also had consequences for the colonized peoples, including exploitation, cultural assimilation, and the suppression of local autonomy.

In 1914-1944, World War I, the interwar period, and the German occupation during World War II had significant impacts on the French economy, resulting in economic challenges, inflation, labor unrest, and hardship for the population.

During the Trente Glorieuses, from 1947 to 1973, France experienced a booming period with an average annual growth rate of 5%. The population grew rapidly, fueled by a high birth rate and declining mortality rate. The economy's growth was driven by productivity gains and increased working hours, as well as investment in targeted industries, regions, and products through indicative planning. The government played a significant role in directing investment and supporting industries of strategic national importance.

During the 1980s France faced economic troubles including a short recession. This led to a shift away from dirigisme, or state intervention, towards a more pragmatic approach. Economic growth resumed later in the decade but was hindered by the economic depression in the early 1990s, which affected the Socialist Party. Jacques Chirac's liberalization measures in the late 1990s strengthened the economy. However, the global economic stagnation after 2005 and the 2008 global crisis had adverse effects on France and the Eurozone, causing difficulties for Nicolas Sarkozy's conservative government.

== Medieval France ==
The collapse of the Roman Empire unlinked the French (Franks) economy from Europe. Town and city life and trade declined and society became based on the self-sufficient manor. What limited international trade existed in the Merovingian age — primarily in luxury goods such as silk, papyrus, and silver — was carried out by foreign merchants such as the Radhanites.

Agricultural output began to increase in the Carolingian age as a result of the arrival of new crops, improvements in agricultural production, and good weather conditions. However, this did not lead to a revival of urban life; in fact, urban activity further declined in the Carolingian era as a result of civil war, Arab raids, and Viking invasions. The Pirenne hypotheses posits that this disruption brought an end to long-distance trade, without which civilization retreated to purely agricultural settlements, and isolated military, church, and royal centers. When trade revived these centers became the nucleus of new towns and cities around which suburbs of merchants and artisans grew.

The High Middle Ages saw a continuation of the agricultural boom of the Carolingian age. In addition, urban life grew during this period; cities such as Paris expanded dramatically.

The 13 decades from 1335 to 1450 spawned a series of economic catastrophes, with bad harvests, famines, plagues, and wars that overwhelmed four generations of the French. The population had expanded, making the food supply more precarious. The bubonic plague ("Black Death") hit Western Europe in 1347, killing a third of the population, and it was echoed by several smaller plagues at 15-year intervals. The French and English armies during the Hundred Years War marched back and forth across the land; they ransacked and burned towns, drained the food supply, disrupted agriculture and trade, and left disease and famine in their wake. Royal authority weakened, as local nobles became strongmen fighting their neighbors for control of the local region. France's population plunged from 17 million to 12 million in 130 years. Finally, starting in the 1450s, a long cycle of recuperation began.

== Early modern France ==
Figures cited in the following section are given in livre tournois, the standard "money of account" used in the period. Comparisons with modern figures are extremely difficult; food items were comparatively cheap, but luxury goods and fabrics were very expensive. In the 15th century, an artisan could earn perhaps 30 livres a year; a great noble could have land revenues from 6,000 to 30,000 livres or more. A late seventeenth-century unskilled worker in Paris earned around 250 livres a year, while a revenue of 4,000 livres a year maintained a relatively successful writer in modest comfort. At the end of the 18th century, a well-off family could earn 100,000 livres by the end of the year, although the most prestigious families could gain twice or three times that much, while, for provincial nobility, yearly earnings of 10,000 livres permitted a minimum of provincial luxury.

=== Renaissance ===
The economy of Renaissance France was, for the first half-century, marked by dynamic demographic growth and developments in agriculture and industry. Until 1795, France was the most populated country in Europe and the third most populous country in the world, behind only China and India. With an estimated population of 17 million in 1400, 20 million in the 17th century, and 28 million in 1789, its population exceeded that of even Russia and was twice the size of Britain and the Dutch Republic. In France, the Renaissance was marked by a massive increase in urban populations, although on the whole, France remained a profoundly rural country, with less than 10% of the population located in urban areas. Paris was one of the most populated cities in Europe, with an estimated population of 650,000 by the end of the 18th century.

Agricultural production of a variety of food items expanded, including olive oil, wine, cider, woad (Fr. "pastel", a source of blue dye), and saffron. Southern France grew artichokes, melons, romaine lettuce, eggplant, salsifies, celery, fennel, parsley, and alfalfa. After 1500 New World crops appeared such as beans, corn (maize), squash, tomatoes, potatoes, and bell peppers. Production techniques remained attached to medieval traditions and produced low yields. With the rapidly expanding population, additional land suitable for farming became scarce. The situation was made worse by repeated disastrous harvests in the 1550s.

Industrial development greatly affected printing (introduced in 1470 in Paris, 1473 in Lyon) and metallurgy. The introduction of the high-temperature forge in northeast France and an increase in mineral mining were important developments, although it was still necessary for France to import many metals, including copper, bronze, tin, and lead. Mines and glasswork benefited greatly from royal tax exemptions for a period of about twenty years. Silk production (introduced in Tours in 1470 and in Lyon in 1536) enabled the French to join a thriving market, but French silk remained of lesser quality than Italian silks. Wool production was widespread, as was the production of linen and of hemp (both major export products).

After Paris, Rouen was the second largest city in France (70,000 inhabitants in 1550), in large part because of its port. Marseille (French since 1481) was France's second major port: it benefited greatly from French trading agreements signed in 1536 with Suleiman the Magnificent. To increase maritime activity, Francis I founded the port city of Le Havre in 1517. Other significant ports included Toulon, Saint Malo and La Rochelle.

Lyon was the center of France's banking and international trade markets. Market fairs occurred four times a year and facilitated the exportation of French goods, such as cloth and fabrics, and importation of Italian, German, Dutch, and English goods. It also allowed the importation of exotic goods such as silks, alum, glass, wools, spices, and dyes. Lyon also contained the houses of most of Europe's banking families, including Fugger and Medici. Regional markets and trade routes linked Lyon, Paris, and Rouen to the rest of the country. Under Francis I and Henry II, the relationships between French imports and the exports to England and to Spain were in France's favor. Trade was roughly balanced with the Netherlands, but France continually ran a large trade deficit with Italy due to the latter's silks and exotic goods. In subsequent decades, English, Dutch and Flemish maritime activity would create competition with French trade, which would eventually displace the major markets to the northwest, leading to the decline of Lyon.

Although France, initially more interested in the Italian Wars, arrived late to the exploration and colonization of the Americas, private initiative and piracy brought Bretons, Normans and Basques early to American waters. Starting in 1524, Francis I began to sponsor exploration of the New World. Significant explorers sailing under the French flag included Giovanni da Verrazzano and Jacques Cartier. Later, Henry II sponsored the explorations of Nicolas Durand de Villegaignon who established a largely Calvinist colony in Rio de Janeiro, 1555–1560. Later, René Goulaine de Laudonnière and Jean Ribault established a Protestant colony in Florida (1562–1565) (see French colonization of the Americas).

By the middle of the 16th century, France's demographic growth, its increased demand for consumer goods, and its rapid influx of gold and silver from Africa and the Americas led to inflation (grain became five times as expensive from 1520 to 1600), and wage stagnation. Although many land-owning peasants and enterprising merchants had been able to grow rich during the boom, the standard of living fell greatly for rural peasants, who were forced to deal with bad harvests at the same time. This led to reduced purchasing power and a decline in manufacturing. The monetary crisis led France to abandon (in 1577) the livre as its money of account, in favor of the écu in circulation, and banning most foreign currencies.

Meanwhile, France's military ventures in Italy and (later) disastrous civil wars demanded huge sums, which were raised with through the taille and other taxes. The taille, which was levied mainly on the peasantry, increased from 2.5 million livres in 1515 to 6 million after 1551, and by 1589 the taille had reached a record 21 million livres. Financial crises hit the royal household repeatedly, and so in 1523, Francis I established a government bond system in Paris, the "rentes sure l'Hôtel de Ville".

The French Wars of Religion were concurrent with crop failures and epidemics. The belligerents also practiced massive "scorched earth" strategies to rob their enemies of foodstuffs. Brigands and leagues of self-defense flourished; transport of goods ceased; villagers fled to the woods and abandoned their lands; towns were put to the torch. The south was particularly affected: Auvergne, Lyon, Burgundy, Languedoc. Agricultural production in those areas fell roughly 40%. The great banking houses left Lyon: from 75 Italian houses in 1568, there remained only 21 in 1597.

=== Rural society ===
In the 17th century rich peasants who had ties to the market economy provided much of the capital investment necessary for agricultural growth, and frequently moved from village to village (or town). Geographic mobility, directly tied to the market and the need for investment capital, was the main path to social mobility. The "stable" core of French society, town guildspeople and village laborers, included cases of staggering social and geographic continuity, but even this core required regular renewal. Accepting the existence of these two societies, the constant tension between them, and extensive geographic and social mobility tied to a market economy holds the key to a clearer understanding of the evolution of the social structure, economy, and even political system of early modern France. Collins (1991) argues that the Annales School paradigm underestimated the role of the market economy; failed to explain the nature of capital investment in the rural economy, and grossly exaggerated social stability.

=== Seventeenth century ===
After 1597, the French economic situation improved and agricultural production was aided by milder weather. Henry IV, with his minister Maximilien de Béthune, Duc de Sully, adopted monetary reforms. These included better coinage, a return to the livre tournois as account money, reduction of the debt, which was 200 million livres in 1596, and a reduction of the tax burden on peasants. Henry IV attacked abuses, embarked on a comprehensive administrative reform, increased charges for official offices, the "paulette", repurchased alienated royal lands, improved roads and funded the construction of canals, and planted the seed of a state-supervised mercantile philosophy. Under Henry IV, agricultural reforms, largely started by Olivier de Serres were instituted. These agricultural and economic reforms, and mercantilism, would also be policies of Louis XIII's minister Cardinal Richelieu. In an effort to counteract foreign imports and exploration, Richelieu sought alliances with Morocco and Persia, and encouraged exploration of New France, the Antilles, Sénégal, Gambia and Madagascar, though only the first two were immediate successes. These reforms would establish the groundwork for the Louis XIV's policies.

Louis XIV's glory was irrevocably linked to two great projects, military conquest and the building of Versailles — both of which required enormous sums of money. To finance these projects, Louis created several additional tax systems, including the "capitation" (begun in 1695) which taxed every person including nobles and the clergy, though exemption could be bought for a large one-time sum, and the "dixième" (1710–1717, restarted in 1733), which was a true tax on income and on property value and was meant to support the military. The taille remained the chief direct tax, but its weight fell differently depending on the fiscal status (généralité) of the province. The pays d'états were at a great advantage because they paid the taille réelle, which was based on a fixed percentage of a property's value. The pays d'élection enjoyed no such privileges; their taille rate was assessed behind closed doors by the Council of State, which raised the taille arbitrarily to try and close the widening government deficit. The differences in terms of material prosperity between the two types of province was noticeable. To exacerbate the burden of the taille, it was levied quarterly rather than annually, and was a heavy burden on rural peasants, tending to fall heaviest on the poorest généralités and parishes. This acted as a disincentive on farmers to increase their productivity, since a larger yield was inevitably offset by a higher taille assessment.

Louis XIV's minister of finances, Jean-Baptiste Colbert, started a mercantile system which used protectionism and state-sponsored manufacturing to promote the production of luxury goods over the rest of the economy. The state established new industries (the royal tapestry works at Beauvais, French quarries for marble), took over established industries (the Gobelins tapestry works), protected inventors, invited workmen from foreign countries (Venetian glass and Flemish cloth manufacturing), and prohibited French workmen from emigrating. To maintain the character of French goods in foreign markets, Colbert had the quality and measure of each article fixed by law, and severely punished breaches of the regulations. This massive investment in (and preoccupation with) luxury goods and court life (fashion, decoration, cuisine, urban improvements, etc.), and the mediatization (through such gazettes as the Mercure galant) of these products, elevated France to the role of arbiter of European taste.

Unable to abolish the duties on the passage of goods from province to province, Colbert did what he could to induce the provinces to equalize them. His régime improved roads and canals. To encourage companies like the important French East India Company founded in 1664, Colbert granted special privileges to trade with the Levant, Senegal, Guinea and other places, for the importing of coffee, cotton, dyewoods, fur, pepper, and sugar, but none of these ventures proved successful. Colbert achieved a lasting legacy in his establishment of the French royal navy; he reconstructed the works and arsenal of Toulon, founded the port and arsenal of Rochefort, and the naval schools of Rochefort, Dieppe and Saint-Malo. He fortified, with some assistance from Vauban, many ports including those of Calais, Dunkirk, Brest and Le Havre.

Colbert's economic policies were a key element in Louis XIV's creation of a centralized and fortified state and in the promotion of government prestige. They had many economic failures: they were overly restrictive on workers, they discouraged inventiveness, and had to be supported by unreasonably high tariffs.

The Revocation of the Edict of Nantes in 1685 created additional economic problems: of the more than 200,000 Huguenot refugees who fled France for Prussia, Switzerland, England, Ireland, United Provinces, Denmark, South Africa and eventually America, many were highly educated skilled artisans and business-owners who took their skills, businesses, and occasionally even their Catholic workers, with them. Both the expansion of French as a European lingua franca in the 18th century, and the modernization of the Prussian army have been due to the Huguenots.

The wars and the weather at the end of the century brought the economy to the brink. Warfare accounted for three quarters of government expenditure between 1689 and 1697, while overall government expenditure doubled. Conditions in rural areas were grim from the 1680s to 1720s. To increase tax revenues, the taille was increased, as too were the prices of official posts in the administration and judicial system. The government also resorted to currency devaluation - there were around 40 changes in the legal value of French coinage, while the Livre tournois lost one third of its metal value over a 20-year period. There was also a short-lived experiment with a paper currency, billets de monnaie, issued in 1701. They immediately declined in value and were withdrawn in 1710.

With the borders guarded due to war, international trade was severely hindered. The economic status of the vast majority of the French population — predominantly simple farmers — was extremely precarious, and the Little Ice Age resulted in further crop failures. Bad harvests caused starvation, killing a tenth of the population in 1693–94. Unwilling to sell or transport their much-needed grain to the army, many peasants rebelled or attacked grain convoys, but the state put these rebellions down. Meanwhile, wealthy families with stocks of grains survived relatively unscathed; in 1689 and again in 1709, in a gesture of solidarity with his suffering people, Louis XIV had his royal dinnerware and other objects of gold and silver melted down.

An economic divergence between Britain and France began in the second half of the 17th century.

=== Eighteenth century ===
France was large and rich and experienced a slow economic and demographic recovery in the first decades following the death of Louis XIV in 1715. Birth rates were high and the infant mortality rate was in steady decline. The overall mortality rate in France fell from an average of 400 deaths per 10,000 people in 1750, to 328 in 1790, and 298 per 10,000 in 1800.

Monetary confidence was briefly eroded by the disastrous paper money system introduced by John Law from 1716 to 1720. Law, as Controller General of Finances, established France's first central bank, the Banque Royale, initially founded as a private entity by Law in 1716 and nationalized in 1718. The bank was entrusted with paying down the enormous debt accumulated through Louis XIV's wars and stimulating the reeling French economy. Initially a great success, the bank's pursuit of French monopolies led it to land speculation in Louisiana through the Mississippi Company, forming an economic bubble in the process that eventually burst in 1720. The collapse of the Banque Royale in the crisis and the paper currency which it issued left a deep suspicion of the idea of a central bank; it was not until 80 years later that Napoleon established the Bank of France. In 1726, under Louis XV's minister Cardinal Fleury, a system of monetary stability was put in place, leading to a strict conversion rate between gold and silver, and set values for the coins in circulation in France. The amount of gold in circulation in the kingdom rose from 731 million livres in 1715 to 2 billion in 1788 as economic activity accelerated.

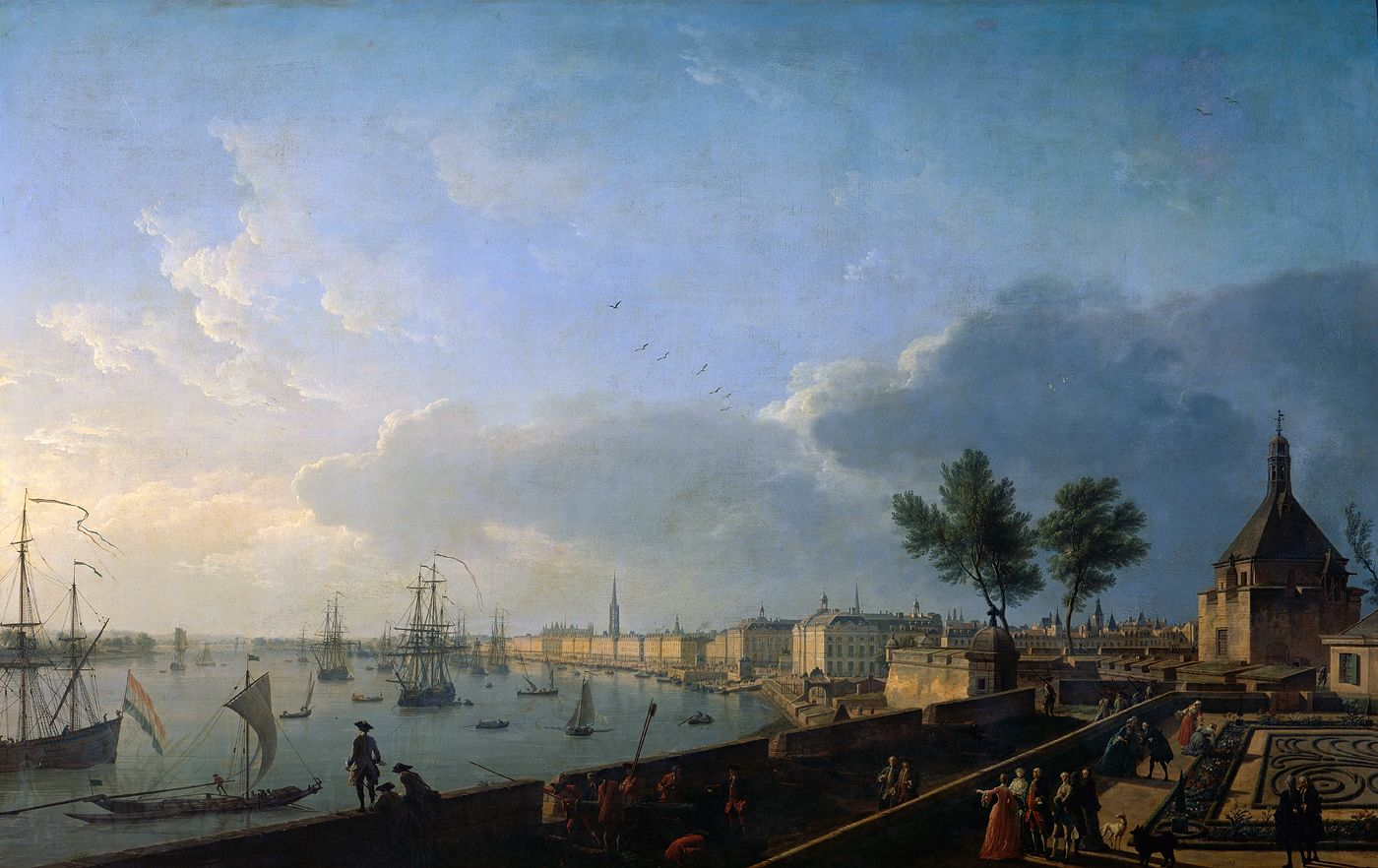
A view of the port of Bordeaux in 1759

The international commercial centers of the country were based in Lyon, Marseille, Nantes, and Bordeaux. Nantes and Bordeaux saw phenomenal growth due to an increase in trade with Spain and Portugal. Trade between France and her Caribbean colonies (Saint-Domingue, Guadeloupe, and Martinique) grew ten-fold between 1715 and 1789, with Saint Domingue the single richest territory in the world by 1789. Many of the lucrative imports from the Caribbean were re-exported to other European countries. By the late 1780s, 87% of the sugar, 95% of the coffee, and 76% of the indigo imported to Bordeaux from the Caribbean was being re-exported. Cádiz was the commercial hub for export of French printed fabrics to India, the Americas and the Antilles (coffee, sugar, tobacco, American cotton), and Africa (the slave trade), centered in Nantes. The value of this export activity amounted to nearly 25% of the French national income by 1789.

Industry continued to expand, averaging 2% growth per year from the 1740s onwards and accelerating in the last decades before the Revolution. The most dynamic industries of the period were mines, metallurgy, and textiles (in particularly printed fabrics, such as those made by Christophe-Philippe Oberkampf). The advances in these areas were often due to British inventors. For example, John Kay's invention of the flying shuttle revolutionized the textile industry, and James Watt's steam engine changed industry as the French had known it. Capital remained difficult to raise for commercial ventures, however, and the state remained highly mercantilistic, protectionist, and interventionist in the domestic economy, often setting requirements for production quality and industrial standards, and limiting industries to certain cities.

In 1749, a new tax, modeled on the "dixième" and called the "vingtième" (or "one-twentieth"), was enacted to reduce the royal deficit. This tax continued until the end of the Ancien Régime. It was based solely on revenues, requiring 5% of net earnings from land, property, commerce, industry and from official offices, and was meant to touch all citizens regardless of status. However, the clergy, the regions with "pays d'état" and the parlements protested; the clergy won exemption, the "pays d'état" won reduced rates, and the parlements halted new income statements, effectively making the "vingtième" a far less efficient tax than it was designed to be. The financial needs of the Seven Years' War led to a second (1756–1780), and then a third (1760–1763), "vingtième". In 1754, the "vingtième" produced 11.7 million livres.

Improvements in communication, like an expanding network of roads and canals, and the diligence stagecoach services which by the 1780s had sharply reduced travel times between Paris and the provincial cities, went a long way towards expanding trade within France. However, most French markets were overwhelmingly local in character (by 1789 only 30% of agricultural produce was being sold in a place other than where it was produced). Price discrepancies between regions and heavy internal customs barriers, which made for exorbitant transportation costs, meant that a unified national market like that of Britain was still far off. On the eve of the Revolution, a shipment of goods travelling from Lorraine to the Mediterranean coast would have been stopped 21 times and incurred 34 different duties.

==== Agriculture ====
Starting in the late 1730s and early 1740s, and continuing for the next 30 years, France's population and economy underwent expansion. Rising prices, particularly for agricultural products, were extremely profitable for large landholders. Artisans and tenant farmers also saw wage increases but on the whole, they benefited less from the growing economy. The ownership share of the peasantry remained largely the same as it had in the previous century, with around 1/3 of arable land in the hands of peasant smallholders in 1789. A newer trend was the amount of land which came into the hands of bourgeois owners during the 18th century: fully 1/3 of the arable land in France by 1789. The stability of land ownership made it a very attractive investment for the bourgeois, as did the social prestige which it brought.

Pivotal developments in agriculture such as modern techniques of crop rotation and the use of fertilizers, which were modeled on successes in Britain and Italy, began to be introduced in parts of France. It would, however, take generations for these reforms to spread throughout all of France. In northern France the three-field system of crop rotation still prevailed, and in the south the two-field system. Under such methods, farmers left either one third or half of their arable land vacant as fallow every year to restore fertility in cycles. This was both a considerable waste of land at any one time which might otherwise have been cultivated, and an inferior way of restoring fertility compared to planting restorative fodder crops.

Farming of recent New World crops, including maize (corn) and potatoes, continued to expand and provided an important supplement to the diet. However, the spread of these crops was geographically limited (potatoes to Alsace and Lorraine, and maize in the more temperate south of France), with the bulk of the population over-reliant on wheat for subsistence. From the late 1760s onwards harsher weather caused consistently poor wheat harvests (there were only three between 1770 and 1789 which were deemed sufficient).

The hardship bad harvests caused mainly affected the small proprietors and peasants who constituted the bulk of French farmers; large land owners continued to prosper from rising land prices and strong demand. Bread shortages could cause steep price rises, which in turn might lead to mass disruption and rioting. The average wage earner in France, during periods of abundance, might spend as much as 70% of his income on bread alone. During shortages, when prices could rise by as much as 100%, the threat of destitution increased dramatically for French families. The French government experimented unsuccessfully with regulating the grain market, lifting price controls in the late 1760s, re-imposing them in the early 1770s, then lifting them again in 1775. Abandoning price controls in 1775, after a bad harvest the previous year, caused grain prices to skyrocket by 50% in Paris; the rioting which erupted as a result, known as the Flour War, engulfed much of northeastern France and had to be put down with force.

==== Slave trade ====
The slaving interests were based in Nantes, La Rochelle, Bordeaux, and Le Havre from 1763 to 1792. The 'négriers' were merchants who specialized in funding and directing cargoes of black captives to the Caribbean colonies, which had high death rates and needed a continuous fresh supply. The négriers intermarried with each other's families; most were Protestants. Their derogatory and patronizing approach toward blacks immunized them from moral criticism. They strongly opposed to the application of the Declaration of Rights of Man to blacks. While they ridiculed the slaves as dirty and savage, they often took black mistresses. The French government paid a bounty for each captive sold to the colonies, which made the business profitable and patriotic. They vigorously defended their business against the abolition movement of 1789.

==== 1770-1789 ====
The agricultural and climatic problems of the 1770s and 1780s led to a large increase in poverty: in some cities in the north, historians have estimated the poor as reaching upwards of 20% of the urban population. Displacement and criminality, mainly theft, also increased, and the growth of groups of mendicants and bandits became a problem. Overall about one third of the French population lived in poverty, approximately 8 million people. This could increase by several million after bad harvests and the resulting economic crises. Although nobles, bourgeoisie, and wealthy landholders saw their revenues affected by the depression, the hardest-hit in this period were the working class and the peasants. While their tax burden to the state had generally decreased in this period, feudal and seigneurial dues had increased.

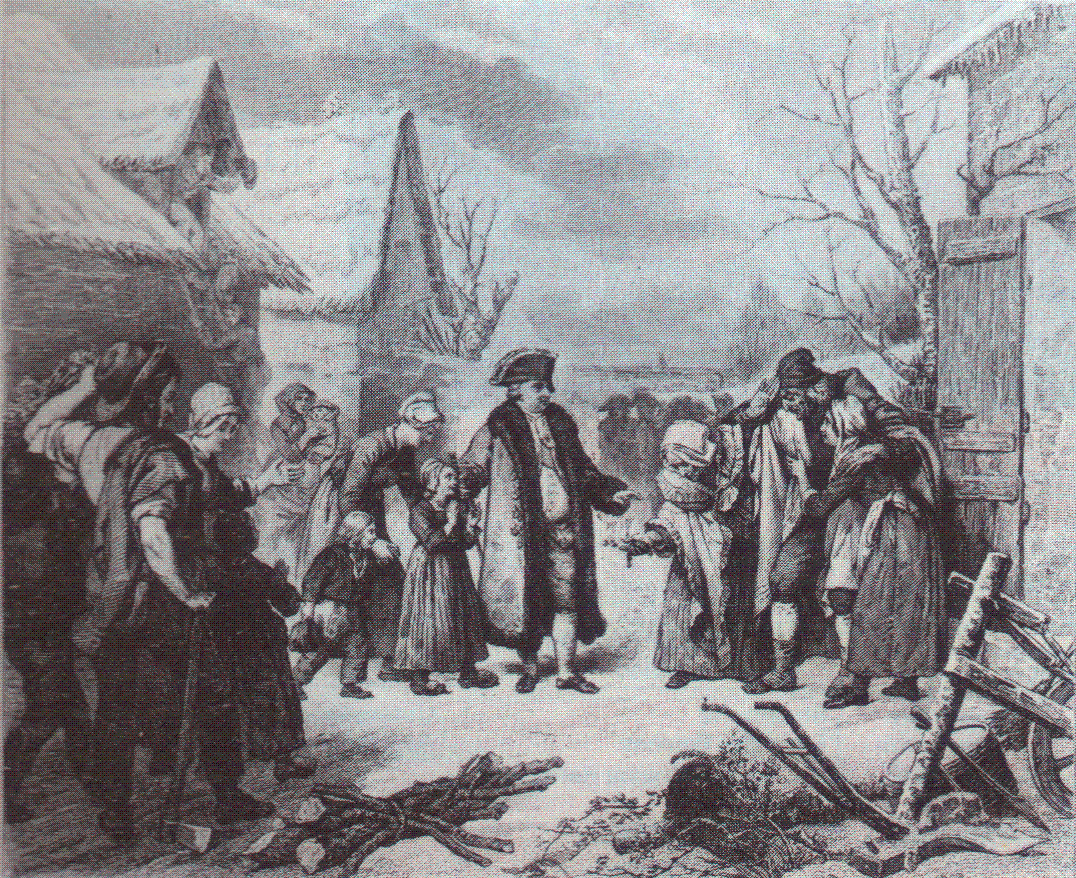
Louis XVI distributing money to the poor of Versailles, during the brutal winter of 1788

In these last decades of the century, French industries continued to develop. Mechanization was introduced, factories were created, and monopolies became more common. However, this growth was complicated by competition from England in the textile and cotton industries. The competitive disadvantage of French manufactures was sorely demonstrated after the 1786 Anglo-French commercial treaty opened the French market to British goods beginning in mid-1787. The cheaper and superior quality British products undercut domestic manufacturers, and contributed to the severe industrial depression underway in France by 1788. The depression was worsened by a catastrophic harvest failure during the summer of 1788, which reverberated across the economy. As peasants and wage earners were forced to spend higher proportions of their income on bread, demand for manufactured goods evaporated.

The American War of Independence had led to a reduction of trade (cotton and slaves), but by the 1780s Franco-American trade was stronger than before. Similarly, the Antilles represented the major source for European sugar and coffee, and it was a huge importer of slaves through Nantes. Paris became France's center of international banking and stock trading in these last decades, like Amsterdam and London, and the Caisse d'Escompte was founded in 1776. Paper money was re-introduced, denominated in livres; these were issued until 1793.

The later years of Louis XV's reign saw some economic setbacks. While the Seven Years' War, 1756–1763, led to an increase in the royal debt and the loss of nearly all of France's North American possessions, it was not until 1775 that the French economy began to truly enter a state of crisis. An extended reduction in agricultural prices over the previous twelve years, with dramatic crashes in 1777 and 1786, further complicated by climatic events such as the disastrous winters of 1785-1789, contributed to the problem. With the government deeply in debt, King Louis XVI was forced to permit the radical reforms of Turgot and Malesherbes. However, the nobles' disaffection led to Turgot's dismissal and Malesherbes' resignation 1776. Jacques Necker replaced them. Louis supported the American Revolution in 1778, but the Treaty of Paris (1783) yielded the French little, excepting an addition to the country's enormous debt. The government was forced to increase taxes, including the "vingtième." Necker had resigned in 1781, to be replaced temporarily by Calonne and Brienne, but was restored to power in 1788.

== 1789–1914 ==
French economic history after the late-18th century Revolution was tied to three major events and trends: the Napoleonic era, competition with Britain and its other neighbors in industrialization, and the 'total wars' of the late-19th and early 20th centuries. Quantitative analysis of output data shows the French per capita growth rates were slightly smaller than Britain's. However the British population tripled in size, while France grew by only a third, so the overall British economy grew much faster. François Crouzet has succinctly summarized the ups and downs of French per capita economic growth in 1815-1913 as follows:
1815-1840: irregular, but sometimes fast growth;
1840-1860: fast growth;
1860-1882: slowing down;
1882-1896: stagnation;
1896-1913: fast growth

For the 1870-1913 era, Angus Maddison gives growth rates for 12 Western advanced countries—10 in Europe, plus the United States and Canada. In terms of per capita growth, France was about average. However again its population growth was very slow, so as far as the growth rate in total size of the economy France was in next to the last place, just ahead of Italy. The 12 countries averaged 2.7% per year in total growth in output, but France only averaged 1.6%. Crouzet argues that the average size of industrial undertakings was smaller in France than in other advanced countries; that machinery was generally less up to date, productivity lower, costs higher. The domestic system and handicraft production long persisted, while big modern factories were for a long time exceptional. Large chunks of the Ancien Régime economy survived. On the whole, the qualitative lag between the British and French economy persisted, and later a similar lag developed between France and Belgium, Germany, and the United States. France did not succeed in catching up with Britain, and was overtaken by several of her rivals.

=== French Revolution ===
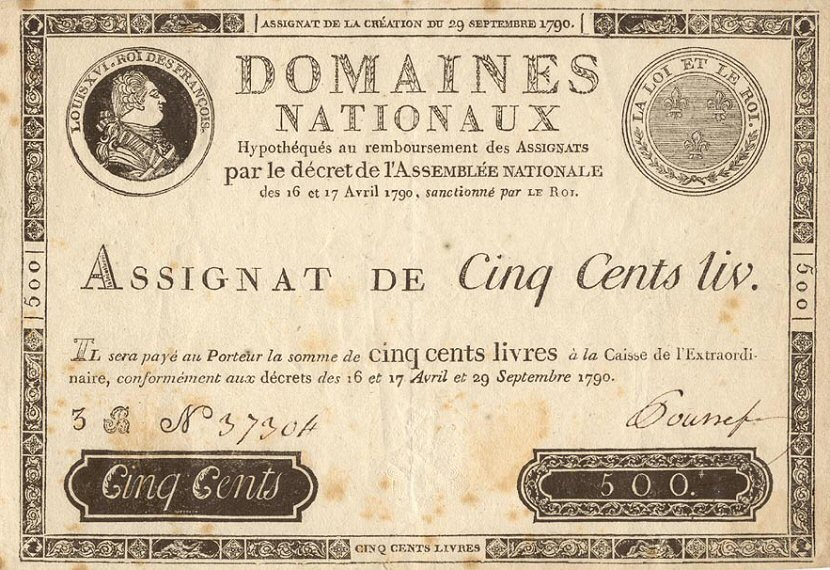
Early Assignat of 29 Sept, 1790: 500 livres

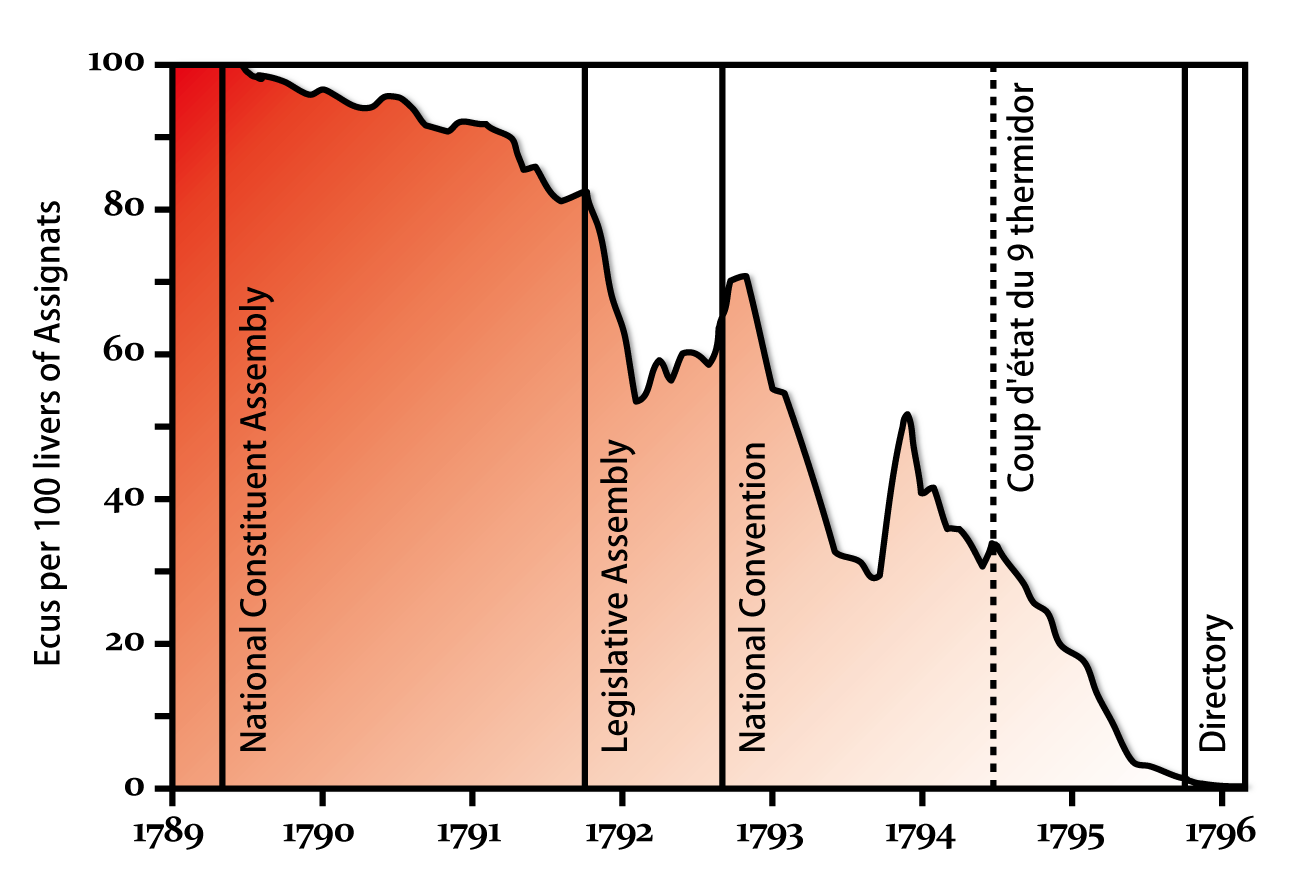
The value of Assignats (1789-1796)

The French Revolution abolished many of the constraints on the economy from the Ancien Régime. It "abolished the guild system as a worthless remnant of feudalism." It also abolished the highly inefficient system of tax farming, whereby private individuals would collect taxes for a hefty fee. The government seized the foundations that had been set up (starting in the 13th century) to provide an annual stream of revenue for hospitals, poor relief, and education. The state sold the lands but typically local authorities did not replace the funding, and so most of the nation's charitable and school systems were massively disrupted.

The economy did poorly in 1790-96 as industrial and agricultural output dropped, foreign trade plunged, and prices soared. The government decided not to repudiate its legacy debt. Instead, it issued more and more paper money (called "assignats") that supposedly were grounded in seized lands. The result was escalating inflation. The government imposed price controls and prosecuted speculators and traders in the black market. People increasingly refused to pay taxes as the annual government deficit increased from 10% of gross national product in 1789 to 64% in 1793. By 1795, after the bad harvest of 1794 and the removal of price controls, inflation reached 3500%. Throughout January and February 1795, the Seine River (the main source of import and export of goods at the time) froze, making it impossible to transport food, luxury goods, and materials that factories depended on in order to keep running. Many factories and workshops were forced to close because they had no way to operate. This led to increased unemployment. Many of the poor (most of the population) were forced to sell their belongings. On the other hand, the very few who were wealthy, could afford anything they needed. "The markets were well stocked, but the food could only be bought at excessive prices".

The value of the assignats "had plunged from 31 percent of that of the silver currency in July 1794 to 8 percent in March 1795" The main cause of assignat depreciation was over-issuance by successive revolutionary governments, who turned to printing more and more paper notes to fund escalating expenditure, especially after the advent of war in 1792. Some 45 billion livres worth of paper had been printed by 1797, which collectively were worth less than one seventh that amount based on 1790 prices. The depreciation of the assignat not only caused spiraling inflation, but had knock-on effects across the entire economy. Because assignats were legal tender, they could be used to service debt repayments at face value, although their real value stood at only a fraction of this. The losses that lenders suffered as a result led them to tighten credit and raise interest rates. Likewise the real value of national lands, which the assignats were pegged to, sank to only 25% of their face value. The assignats were withdrawn in 1796 but the replacements also fueled inflation. Inflation was finally ended by Napoleon in 1803 with the gold franc as the new currency.

The diminution of the economic power of the nobility and the clergy also had serious disruptive effects on the French economy. With the closure of monasteries, chapters, and cathedrals in towns like Tours, Avignon and Bayeux, thousands were deprived of their livelihoods as servants, artisans, or tradesmen. Likewise, the exodus of nobles devastated the luxury trades and led to still greater hardship for servants, as well as industries and supply networks dependent on aristocratic consumption. For those nobles who remained in France, the heated anti-aristocratic social environment dictated more modest patterns of dress and consumption, while the spiraling inflation of the assignats dramatically reduced their buying power. The plunging market for silk, for example, meant that output in the silk capital of Lyons fell by half between 1789 and 1799, contributing to a loss of almost one-third of Lyons' pre-revolutionary population.

In the cities entrepreneurship on a small scale flourished, as restrictive monopolies, privileges, barriers, rules, taxes, and guilds gave way. However, the British blockade that began in 1793 severely damaged overseas trade. The wartime exigencies enacted that year by the National Convention worsened the situation by banning the export of essential goods and embargoing neutral shipping from entering French ports. Although these restrictions were lifted in 1794, the British had managed to usurp transatlantic shipping lanes in the meantime, further reducing markets for French goods. By 1796, foreign trade accounted for just 9% of the French economy, compared to 25% in 1789.

==== Agriculture ====
Agriculture was transformed by the Revolution. It abolished tithes owed to local churches as well as feudal dues owed to local landlords. The result hurt the tenants, who paid both higher rents and higher taxes. It nationalized all church lands, as well as lands belonging to royalist enemies who went into exile. The government in Paris planned to use these seized lands to finance expenditure by issuing assignats. With the breakup of large estates controlled by the Church and nobility and worked by hired hands, rural France became permanently a land of small independent farms. The rural proletariat and nobility both gave way to the commercial farmer. Cobban says the revolution "bequeathed to the nation "a ruling class of landowners." Most of these new landowners were bourgeois in origin, as the economic uncertainties of the 1790s and the abolition of venal office made land ownership an attractive and safe investment.

However, the recruitment needs of the wartime French Republic between 1792 and 1802 led to shortages of agricultural workers. Farmers were also subject to requisition of their livestock by passing armies; the consequent losses of manure negatively impacted the fertility and productivity of the land.

Overall the Revolution did not greatly change the French business system and probably helped freeze in place the horizons of the small business owner. The typical businessman owned a small store, mill or shop, with family help and a few paid employees; large-scale industry was less common than in other industrializing nations.

=== Napoleon and Bourbon reaction: 1799-1830 ===
After 1799 Napoleon paid for his expensive wars by multiple means, starting with the modernization of the rickety financial system. He conscripted soldiers at low wages, raised taxes, placed large-scale loans, sold lands formerly owned by the Catholic Church, sold Louisiana to the United States, plundered conquered areas and seized food supplies, and carried out requisitions on countries he controlled, such as Italy.

The constant war footing of the Napoleonic Era, 1795–1815, stimulated production at the cost of investment and growth. Production of armaments and other military supplies, fortifications, and the general channeling of the society toward establishing and maintaining massed armies, temporarily increased economic activity after several years of revolution. The rampant inflation of the Revolutionary era was halted by not printing the new currency quite as fast. The maritime Continental Blockade, implemented by Napoleon's opponents and very effectively enforced by the Royal Navy, gradually cut into any economic arena in which the French economy was not self-sufficient. 1815 saw the final defeat and collapse of the French forces. This gave rise to a relatively peaceful period across Europe until 1914, during which important institutional reforms such as the introduction of a highly rationalized legal system could be implemented.

Napoleon's impact on the French economy was of modest importance in the long run. He did sweep away the old guilds and monopolies and trade restrictions. He introduced the metric system and fostered the study of engineering. Most important, he opened up French finance by the creation of the indispensable Bank of France. However, entrepreneurs had little opportunity to take advantage of these reforms. Napoleon provided a protected continental market by systematic exclusion of all imports from Britain. This had the effect of encouraging innovation in Britain, where the Industrial Revolution was well underway, and diverting the need for innovation in France. What innovation took place focused on armaments for the army, and was of little value in peacetime. In France the business crisis in 1810-1812 undermined what successes entrepreneurs had achieved.

With the restoration of the Bourbons in 1814, the reactionary aristocracy with its disdain for entrepreneurship returned to power. British goods flooded the market, and France responded with high tariffs and protectionism to protect its established businesses especially handcrafts and small-scale manufacturing such as textiles. The tariff on iron goods reached 120%.

Agriculture had never needed protection but now demanded it from the lower prices of imported foodstuffs, such as Russian grain. French winegrowers strongly supported the tariff – their wines did not need it, but they insisted on a high tariff on the import of tea. One agrarian deputy explained: "Tea breaks down our national character by converting those who use it often into cold and stuffy Nordic types, while wine arouses in the soul that gentle gaiety that gives Frenchmen their amiable and witty national character." The French government falsified statistics to claim that exports and imports were growing – actually there was stagnation and the economic crisis of 1826-29 disillusioned the business community and readied them to support the revolution in 1830.

=== Banking and finance ===
Perhaps the only successful and innovative economic sector was banking. Paris emerged as an international center of finance in the mid-19th century, second only to London. It had a strong national bank and numerous aggressive private banks that financed projects all across Europe and the expanding French Empire. Napoleon III had a goal of overtaking London to make Paris the premier financial center of the world, but the war in 1870 reduced the range of Parisian financial influence. One key development was the establishment of one of the main branches of the Rothschild family.

In 1812, James Mayer Rothschild arrived in Paris from Frankfurt, and set up the bank "De Rothschild Frères". This bank funded Napoleon's return from Elba and became one of the leading banks in European finance. The Rothschild banking family of France funded France's major wars and colonial expansion. The Banque de France founded in 1796 helped resolve the financial crisis of 1848 and emerged as a powerful central bank. The Comptoir National d'Escompte de Paris (CNEP) was established during the financial crisis and the Republican revolution of 1848. Its innovations included both private and public sources in funding large projects and the creation of a network of local offices to reach a much larger pool of depositors.

The Péreire brothers founded the Crédit Mobilier. It became a powerful and dynamic funding agency for major projects in France, Europe and the world at large. It specialized in mining developments; it funded other banks including the Imperial Ottoman Bank and the Austrian Mortgage Bank; it funded railway construction. It also funded insurance companies and building contractors. The bank had large investments in a transatlantic steamship line, urban gas lighting, a newspaper and the Paris Métro public transit system. Other major banks included the Société Générale, and in the provinces the Crédit Lyonnais. After its defeat in 1871, France had to pay enormous reparations to Germany, with the German army continuing its occupation until the debt was paid. The 5 billion francs amounted to a fourth of France's GNP – and one-third of Germany's – and was nearly double the usual annual exports of France. Observers thought the indemnity was unpayable and was designed to weaken France and justify long years of military occupation. However France paid it off in less than three years. The payments, in gold, acted as a powerful stimulus that dramatically increased the volume of French exports, and on the whole, produced positive economic benefits for France.

The Paris Bourse or stock exchange emerged as a key market for investors to buy and sell securities. It was primarily a forward market, and it pioneered in creating a mutual guarantee fund so that failures of major brokers would not escalate into a devastating financial crisis. Speculators in the 1880s who disliked the control of the Bourse used a less regulated alternative the Coulisse. However, it collapsed in the face of the simultaneous failure of a number of its brokers in 1895–1896. The Bourse secured legislation that guaranteed its monopoly, increased control of the curb market, and reduced the risk of another financial panic.

=== Industrialization ===
France in 1815 was overwhelmingly a land of peasant farms, with some handicraft industry. Paris, and the other much smaller urban centers had little industry. At the onset of the nineteenth century, GDP per capita in France was lower than in Great Britain and the Netherlands. This was probably due to higher transaction costs, which were mainly caused by inefficient property rights and a transportation system more geared towards to military needs than to economic growth. Industry was dominated by small and medium-sized firms, which continued using traditional techniques of production because transportation barriers protected their local markets from outside competition. According to Roger Price, "modern forms of concentrated production were exceptional and coexisted with the typical establishments of a pre-industrial economy." In 1851, only 1.5 million people worked in firms which employed more than ten people, while 3 million were employed in smaller workshops. Restraints on the growth of heavy industry included poor transportation infrastructure, the slow growth of agricultural production, of demand from the agricultural population, and a lack of raw materials and power sources.

Historians are reluctant to use the term "Industrial Revolution" for France because the slow pace seems an exaggeration for France as a whole. The Industrial Revolution was well underway in Britain when the Napoleonic wars ended, and soon spread to Belgium and, to a lesser extent to northeastern France. The remainder remained little changed. The growth regions developed industry, based largely on textiles, as well as some mining. The pace of industrialization was far below Britain, Germany, the United States and Japan. The persecution of the Protestant Huguenots after 1685 led to a large-scale flight of entrepreneurial and mechanical talents that proved hard to replace. Instead French business practices were characterized by tightly held family firms, which emphasized traditionalism and paternalism. These characteristics supported a strong banking system, and made Paris a world center for luxury craftsmanship, but slowed the building of large factories and giant corporations. Napoleon had promoted engineering education, and it paid off in the availability of well-trained graduates who developed the transportation system, especially the railways after 1840.'

The only period in the 19th century in which economic growth accelerated at the rate of other industrializing nations was 1852–1857, during which modern industry gained preeminence over smaller, artisanal production. The advent of the railway integrated previously isolated markets, facilitated easy transportation of raw materials and finished products, and facilitated the development of mechanization and financing systems. By removing transportation barriers, the railways eliminated the limits on growth for industries like coal and metallurgy. Railway construction also provided a massive stimulus in itself to metallurgy, coal and engineering, "stimulating the further concentration of production by which capitalism became industrial rather than commercial." Small firms which had dominated local markets with their products made using small-scale, artisanal methods, now had to compete with mass-produced, cheaper, and often higher quality products coming from factories.

=== Retail ===
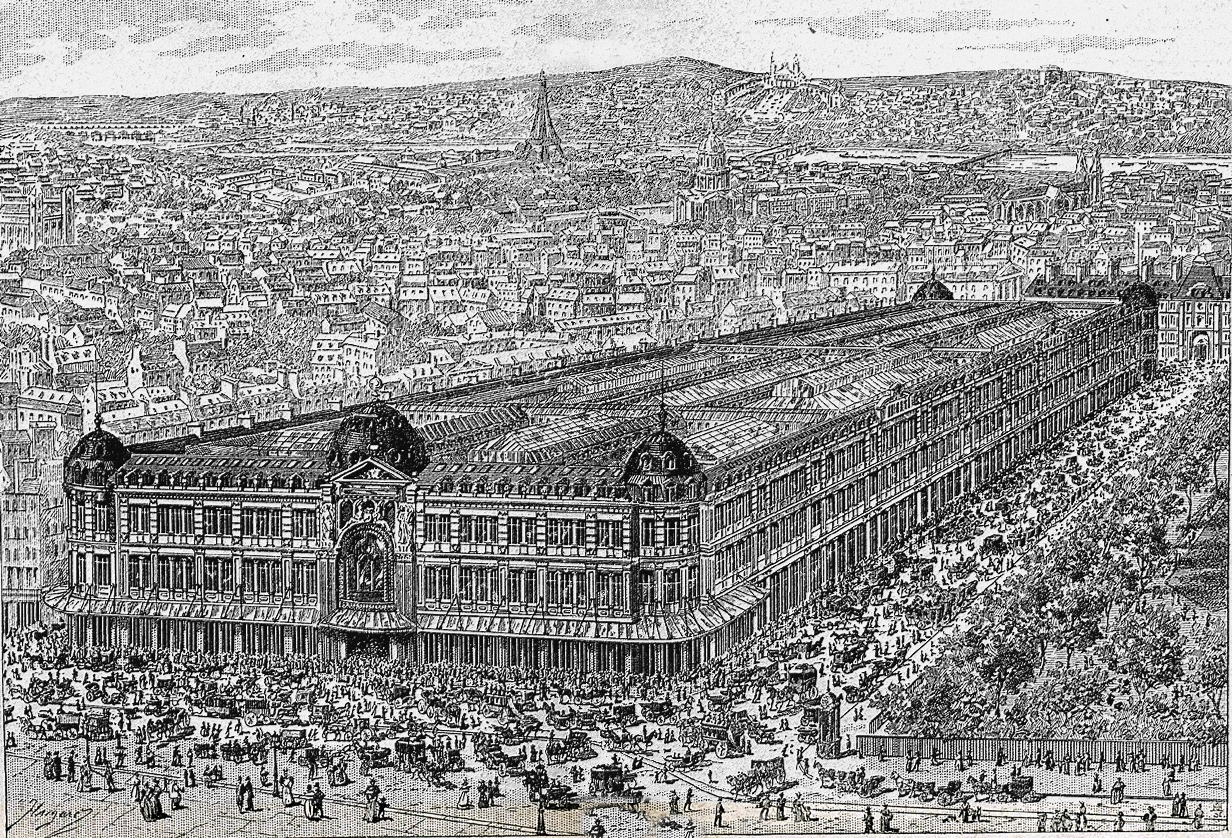
Au Bon Marché

Paris became world-famous for making consumerism a social priority and economic force, especially through its upscale arcades filled with luxury shops and its grand department stores. These were "dream machines" that set the world standard for consumption of fine products by the upper classes as well as the rising middle class. Paris took the lead internationally in elaborate department stores reaching upscale consumers with luxury items and high quality goods presented in a novel and highly seductive fashion. The Parisian department store had its roots in the magasin de nouveautés, or novelty store; the first, the Tapis Rouge, was created in 1784. They flourished in the early 19th century, with La Belle Jardiniere (1824), Aux Trois Quartiers (1829), and Le Petit Saint Thomas (1830). Balzac described their functioning in his novel César Birotteau. In the 1840s, the new railroads brought wealthy consumers to Paris from a wide region. Luxury stores grew in size, and featured plate glass display windows, fixed prices and price tags, and advertising in newspapers.

The entrepreneur Aristide Boucicaut in 1852 took Au Bon Marché, a small shop in Paris, set fixed prices (with no need to negotiate with clerks), and offered guarantees that allowed exchanges and refunds. He invested heavily in advertising, and added a wide variety of merchandise. Sales reached five million francs in 1860. In 1869 he moved to larger premises; sales reached 73 million in 1877. The multi-department enterprise occupied fifty thousand square meters with 1788 employees. Half the employees were women; unmarried women employees lived in dormitories on the upper floors. The success inspired numerous competitors all vying for upscale customers.

The French gloried in the national prestige brought by the great Parisian stores. The great writer Émile Zola (1840–1902) set his novel Au Bonheur des Dames (1882–83) in the typical department store. Zola represented it as a symbol of the new technology that was both improving society and devouring it. The novel describes merchandising, management techniques, marketing, and consumerism.

Other competitors moved downscale to reach much larger numbers of shoppers. The Grands Magasins Dufayel featured inexpensive prices and worked to teach workers how to shop in the new impersonal environment. Its advertisements promised the opportunity to participate in the newest, most fashionable consumerism at reasonable cost. The latest technology was featured, such as cinemas and exhibits of inventions like X-ray machines (used to fit shoes) and the gramophone. Increasingly after 1870 the stores' work force included greater numbers of young women. Despite the low pay and long hours they gained access to the newest and most fashionable merchandise and to interactions with upscale customers.

By the 21st century, the grand Paris department stores had difficulty surviving in the new economic world. In 2015, just four remained; Au Bon Marché, now owned by the luxury goods firm LVMH; BHV; Galeries Lafayette and Printemps.

=== Railways ===
In France, railways became a national medium for the modernization of backward regions, and a leading advocate of this approach was the poet-politician Alphonse de Lamartine. One writer hoped that railways might improve the lot of "populations two or three centuries behind their fellows" and eliminate "the savage instincts born of isolation and misery." Consequently, France built a centralized system that radiated from Paris (plus lines that cut east to west in the south). This design was intended to achieve political and cultural goals rather than maximize efficiency.

The development of the railways was "one of the major achievements of the Second Empire in the area of economic policy." In the first few months of 1852, more than 1,500 kilometers of new track were approved by the French state, and the average rate of construction grew to 1,000 kilometers of new track per year. The Second Empire was responsible for over half of the network at its maximum extent, in terms of the concessions granted. Over one third of the network was constructed during the Second Empire. Investment in railways grew dramatically to average 300 million francs per year in the four years between 1852 and 1856. This was three times the rate of investment per year for the period between 1848 and 1852.

After some consolidation, six companies controlled monopolies of their regions, subject to close control by the government in terms of fares, finances, and even minute technical details. The central government department of Ponts et Chaussées (bridges and roads, or the Highways Department) brought in British engineers and workers, handled much of the construction work, provided engineering expertise and planning, land acquisition, and construction of permanent infrastructure such as the track bed, bridges and tunnels. It also subsidized militarily necessary lines along the German border, which were considered necessary for the national defense. In 1878, the Minister of Public Works Charles de Freycinet launched an ambitious public works program, often called the Freycinet Plan, to counter an economic downturn. The plan involved the purchaser of railroads by the state and the financing of new railways, waterways, and roads. Around 150 lines were constructed under this program, which was nearly complete by 1914.

Private operating companies provided management, hired labor, laid the tracks, and built and operated stations. They purchased and maintained the rolling stock—6,000 locomotives were in operation in 1880, which averaged 51,600 passengers a year or 21,200 tons of freight. Much of the equipment was imported from Britain and therefore did not stimulate machinery makers. Although starting the whole system at once was politically expedient, it delayed completion, and forced even more reliance on temporary exports brought in from Britain. Financing was also a problem. The solution was a narrow base of funding through the Rothschilds and the closed circles of the Bourse in Paris, so France did not develop the same kind of national stock exchange that flourished in London and New York. The system did help modernize the parts of rural France it reached, but it did not help create local industrial centers. Critics such as Émile Zola complained that it never overcame the corruption of the political system, but rather contributed to it.

The railways helped the industrial revolution in France by facilitating a national market for raw materials, wines, cheeses, and imported manufactured products. Yet the goals set by the French for their railway system were moralistic, political, and military rather than economic. As a result, the freight trains were shorter and less heavily loaded than those in such rapidly industrializing nations such as Britain, Belgium or Germany. Other infrastructure needs in rural France, such as better roads and canals, were neglected because of the expense of the railways, so it seems likely that there were net negative effects in areas not served by the trains.

=== Total War ===
In 1870 the relative decline in industrial strength, compared to Bismarck's Germany, proved decisive in the Franco-Prussian War. The total defeat of France, in this conflict, was less a demonstration of French weakness than it was of German militarism and industrial strength. This contrasted with France's occupation of Germany during the Napoleonic wars. By 1914, however, German armament and general industrialization had out-distanced not only France but all of its neighbors. Just before 1914, France was producing about one-sixth as much coal as Germany, and a quarter as much steel.

=== Agricultural improvement ===
From the 1850s onwards, French agriculture underwent dramatic structural change, underpinned by several factors. Agriculture became more productive due to increased use of fertilizers and greater availability of manure. Grain yields increased by 50% between 1850 and 1880. Farmers replaced the fallowing of land with fodder crops and sugar beets, which permitted more livestock to be raised. In the south, the three-stage system used in northern France replaced the two-stage system, with fodder crops substituted for fallowing. More livestock provided more income for farmers and more manure. In the Paris basin, the introduction of the sugar beet after 1850 drastically increased the productivity of the land; the turnover of a hectare of land in this region rose from 150 to 200 francs in 1840 to 400 francs in 1880.

Better equipment was also introduced, with the horse plow replacing the swing plow and the scythe replacing the sickle. In areas like the Paris basin with large-scale farming operations, capital-intensive tedding machines, reapers, threshers, and mowing machines were introduced between 1873 and 1882.

Investment in agriculture, previously a sector of the economy starved for capital, also rose. This was in part due to the migration of peasants to the towns, motivating employers to introduce improved tools and harvesting machinery to offset the tightening labor market. The damaging economic effects of poor harvests were also eliminated in the 1850s, as prices were stabilized. This was due substantially to the development of the railways, which provided fast, cheap, and bulk transport for grain and other foodstuffs which helped ensure demand was met across the country. This was first demonstrated after the harvest failure of 1846, when the Paris-Orléans line distributed food quickly to the areas it reached, shielding those areas from the catastrophic effects of the harvest failure suffered in other parts of the country. By the 1850s the railways had developed to such an extent that they were able to minimize the effects of the poor harvests in 1853 and 1855 throughout the country.

Grain could be transported from regions with surplus harvest to those with shortages, or imported from abroad. Merchants were encouraged to expand their markets by the low cost of rail transport. A sliding scale of tariffs on grain imports discouraged merchants from importing sufficient quantities of grain, since they could be subject to higher tariffs if prices decreased at home. This came to an end when the tariffs were repealed in 1860, not to be reintroduced until 1885. Imports jumped from 3 to 5 million hectoliters in 1846 following the poor harvest, and the next year stood at 10 million. In 1855, 10 million hectoliters were imported, but because the railway network was not yet mature and because of the discouraging effect of the tariffs, it took eight months to distribute this grain throughout the country. By 1861, 13.5 million hectoliters were imported, but this time distribution was much faster because of the progress of the railway network. In 1879, 29.8 million hectoliters were imported following several years of poor harvests.

Winemaking regions like the former province of Languedoc and the Côte-d'Or benefited greatly from the railways, with a “frenzy” of vine-planting taking place in the former region after 1850, and the productive output of the Côte-d'Or rising from 400,000 to 800,000 hectoliters of wine.

=== Modernization of peasants ===
France was a rural nation as late as 1840, but a major change took place after railways started arriving in the 1850s–60s. In his seminal book Peasants Into Frenchmen (1976), historian Eugen Weber traced the modernization of French villages and argued that rural France went from backward and isolated to modern and possessing a sense of French nationhood during the late 19th and early 20th centuries. He emphasized the roles of railroads, republican schools, and universal military conscription. He based his findings on school records, migration patterns, military service documents and economic trends. Weber argued that until 1900 or so a sense of French nationhood was weak in the provinces. Weber then looked at how the policies of the French Third Republic created a sense of French nationality in rural areas. The book was widely praised, but was criticized by some, such as Ted W. Margadant, who argued that a sense of Frenchness already existed in the provinces before 1870.

French national policy was protectionist with regard to agricultural products, to protect the very large agricultural population, especially through the Méline tariff of 1892. France maintained two forms of agriculture, a modern, mechanized, capitalistic system in the Northeast, and in the rest of the country a reliance on subsistence agriculture on very small farms with low income levels. Modernization of the subsistence sector began in the 1940s, and resulted in a rapid depopulation of rural France, although protectionist measures remained national policy.

=== Colonialism ===
In the 1880s, increasing competition amongst the great European powers for territory overseas led France to acquire new colonies. By 1912, the French colonial empire constituted 3.4 million square miles and 55 million inhabitants. While some of these territories had little to no economic value (they were instead valuable for geopolitical/strategic reasons), others possessed lucrative raw materials and were exploited as markets for French goods. The development of the new colonies spurred a demand for equipment, machinery, and other goods which could only be sourced in France. The railroads and other infrastructure projects required French engineering expertise and a whole range of machinery/tools for their construction. Farmers and miners turned to France for the tools, chemicals, seed, etc. needed for their new enterprises.

Some colonies were exporters of key raw materials to France. French West Africa was the primary source of coffee for the French market and a major source of cocoa. Sugar was supplied from Martinique, Réunion, and Guadeloupe. The colonies in north Africa, West Africa, and the Caribbean provided a range of tropical fruits like bananas, citrus, pineapples, and coconuts.

Although the French government encouraged investment and development of the nation's overseas possessions, the government itself was reluctant to commit funds beyond their initial conquest and establishment. In 1900, the French parliament passed a law requiring the colonies to be fiscally self-sufficient. There was an active imperial lobby in France promoting greater investment and closer trading links between France and her colonies. This lobby argued for exclusionary tariff policy which would favor colonial trade. As protectionism returned in the 1870s and 1880s, subjecting imports to high tariffs, steps were taken to exempt the colonies. A customs union was established with Algeria in 1884, and with French Indochina in 1887. In 1892, a tariff-exemption zone was established between France and Algeria, Indochina, the old Caribbean colonies of the ancien régime, Gabon, Tunisia, and Madagascar. This allowed France and the chosen colonies to trade freely with one another. Another category of colonies exempted French imports from tariffs, but had to pay most favoured nation tariff rates when exporting their goods to France. This category included much of French West Africa, New Caledonia, Saint Pierre and Miquelon. Through this "highly preferential system", France was able to supply around 65.5% of the imports to her colonies.

By the time the First World War broke out, the French overseas empire had become an important economic asset to the mother country. The empire absorbed 13% of French exports in 1913 and constituted 9.4% of her imports. This increased the national income by 5 to 6%. From 1902 the share of colonial trade was larger than France's trade with Germany, Belgium, and Luxembourg combined. The imperial markets were especially important as a prop for French industries which were in decline, like textile, candle and soap manufacture. The preferential colonial markets compensated for the weakness of French exports elsewhere.

=== Late 19th century crisis ===
France, like other industrializing countries of the time, suffered the effects of a worldwide economic downturn in the late 19th century. Depressions and periods of recovery characterized the entire epoch between 1880 and 1914. By the time full recovery began at the end of the century, French industrialization was behind 15 years and the long period of crisis had scarred entrepreneurs and investors.

France recovered better from the Panic of 1873 than other countries like Germany, and resumed strong growth on a par with that of the 1850s until the end of 1881. There was a severe business depression in England, France, Belgium and Germany lasting from 1882 to 1885 or 1886. The failure of the French bank Union Générale in early 1882 had reverberations throughout Europe. According to Alan Sorkin, "Nearly £3 million were withdrawn from the Bank of England for France between 30 January 1882 and 15 February 1882. Stock prices fell dramatically, affecting not only France but other neighboring countries." There was an uptick in growth in the economy 1887–1889, but it wasn't until 1897-98 that full recovery took place."

The worldwide downturn was particularly severe in France, because of demand problems like slow demographic growth and the large proportion of the population employed in agriculture (45% in 1891). This was a sector whose already low-paid workers suffered even greater losses of income from the downturn. The distribution of the national income left workers with little extra money to spend, and also ensured that bourgeois demand continued to be “highly individualistic”. These characteristics limited the development of mass consumption. Scourges like the Great French Wine Blight, caused by the Phylloxera insect, and the parasitic disease known as pébrine which affected silkworms and the silk industry, made the depression of 1882 worse and more prolonged. The importance of wine production to the economy was such that around 37% of French GDP was lost between 1885 and 1894 due to phylloxera. Other factors contributing to the length and seriousness of the depression were the debt defaults of a number of foreign governments, railway company bankruptcies, a trade war between Italy and France between 1887 and 1898, new French tariffs on imports, and the general adoption of protectionism throughout the world. Between 1881 and 1892, the French government adopted tariff protection, including the Méline tariff of 1892. The Méline tariff was levelled on grain imports and stopped the fall of prices, leading to a substantial rise in agricultural wages.

From the 1860s agricultural prices began to stagnate, and the general fall of prices caused a “great depression” in agriculture between 1874 and 1895. The strong growth in worldwide agricultural output of previous decades culminated in a glut of foodstuffs on world markets once transportation costs, hitherto prohibitively high, fell. Cereal prices, the first to experience price declines, were 27% lower in 1895 compared to their 1871-75 levels. Land lost about one third of its value between 1879 and 1913, not just because of the agricultural crisis also declining population densities in the countryside. Production stagnated, with the mean annual growth in agricultural production at 0.26% between 1865 and 1900. Mean annual production fell by 0.8% in the years 1874-8 and 1889–93.

The phylloxera outbreak ravaged French vineyards, reducing French wine output by two thirds between 1875 and 1889. In 1878, one quarter of French vineyards were affected by phylloxera. Wine production, which stood at 84 million hectoliters in 1875, declined sharply to below 40 million for a period of 15 years. Local vineyards perished and the market for table wines was overtaken by producers of low quality wine in Lower Languedoc, and Algeria. The industry recovered as resistant varieties of grape vine were gradually introduced from North America.

From 1897, healthy economic growth on a par with that of 1815-1848 resumed. It was aided by the expansion of iron mining in Lorraine and the birth of new industries like automobile manufacture, electricity, aluminum and nickel mining.

== 1914–1944 ==
Economic growth rates in France, 1900-1999
Decade	average annual growth rate
1900s	2.27%
1910s	1.89%
1920s	4.43%
1930s	0.63%
1945-49	2.16%
1950s	3.85%
1960s	4.98%
1970s	3.10%
1980s	2.02%
1990s	1.30%
Source: Jean-Pierre Dormois, The French Economy in the Twentieth Century (2004) p 31

The overall growth rate of the French economy shows a very strong performance in the 1920s and again in the 1960s, with poor performances in the 1910s, 1930s, and 1990s.

=== World War I ===
The economy was critically hurt by the German seizure of major industrial areas in the northeast. While the occupied area in 1913 contained only 14% of France's industrial workers, it produced 58% of the steel, and 40% of the coal. Considerable relief came with the massive influx of American food, money and raw materials in 1917–1928. The Dalbiez Law of August 1915 set the number of workers required for the different sectors of the war economy, in an attempt to balance the labor needs of industry with the conscription requirements of the army. Individual examinations were established to keep workers in factories, and under the Dalbiez Law "military workers" under the control of the war ministry were deployed away from the front to work in the war economy.

Agricultural productivity fell precipitously due to the German occupation, the requisitioning of draught animals, as well as the loss of manpower and fertilizer, and machinery shortages. At its lowest point in 1917, the grain harvest was 40% below pre-war levels. The high prices for agricultural products which resulted were a boon for farmers, incentivizing "superhuman efforts" to cultivate by those who remained on farms. Separation allowances provided to the dependents of soldiers also gave an unexpected boost to the income of poor, rural families. Many peasants were able to pay off debts, purchase more land, and enjoy a higher quality of living. Conversely, the urban population and industrial workers became increasingly discontented with rising food prices, and the failure of their wages to keep pace.

French credit collapsed in 1916 and Britain began lending large sums to France. The J.P. Morgan & Co bank in New York assumed control of French loans in the fall of 1916 and relinquished it to the U.S. government when the U.S. entered the war in April 1917. On the other hand, the economy was helped by American loans which were used to purchase food and manufactured goods to allow a decent standard of living. The arrival of over a million American soldiers in 1918 brought heavy spending for food and construction materials. Labor shortages were in part alleviated by the use of volunteer and forced labor from the colonies.

The war damages amounted to about 113% of the GDP of 1913, chiefly the destruction of productive capital and housing. 91% of settlements across ten départements in the north and northeast suffered material damage, and 620 communes were destroyed. The national debt rose from 66% of GDP in 1913 to 170% in 1919, reflecting the heavy use of bond issues to pay for the war. Inflation was severe, with the franc losing over half its value against the British pound. The GDP Per Capita in 1914 was 2,880$.

=== 1919–1929 ===
The war effort and the occupation of French territory by Germany had dealt a heavy blow to the French economy. Overall French industrial and agricultural production was down 45% in 1919 compared to 1913. Infrastructure in the occupied region - towns, villages, factories, mines, and railways - suffered extensive destruction and/or over-exploitation in the case of mines and factories, reducing their output. Prime agricultural land had been ruined and livestock lost, and 27% of young men between the ages of 18 and 27 were killed, with a consequent negative impact on marriages and births which would impact the labor force in the 1930s. Fertility rates sharply declined during the First World War, with the deficit of births estimated to be 1.4 million. Combined with an equivalent number of casualties, the French population was 2.8 million people smaller than it otherwise would have been, due to the war.

At the Paris Peace Conference, 1919, vengeance against defeated Germany was the main French theme. France demanded full payment by Germany of the damages it created in German-occupied areas. It also wanted the full cost of postwar veterans benefits. Clemenceau, Prime Minister 16 November 1917 – 20 January 1920, was largely effective against the moderating influences of the British and Americans. France obtained large (but unspecified) reparations, regained Alsace-Lorraine and obtained mandates to rule parts of former German colonies in Africa.

In January 1923 as a response to the failure of the Germans to ship enough coal as part of its reparations, France (and Belgium) occupied the industrial region of the Ruhr. Germany responded with passive resistance, printing vast amounts of money to support idled workers, thereby causing a Hyperinflation. Inflation heavily damaged the German middle class (because their bank accounts became worthless) and also damaged the French franc. France fomented a separatist movement pointing to an independent buffer state, but it collapsed after some bloodshed. The intervention was a failure, and in summer 1924 France accepted the solution to the reparations issues as expressed in the Dawes Plan.

Industrial productivity returned to pre-war levels by 1924 and by 1929 it was 40% above 1913 levels. The French government eased immigration rules to offset the manpower shortage and some 2 million workers arrived in France as a result. Inflation was a serious problem, fueled by high government borrowing and a huge increase in the amount of money in circulation (37,900 million francs were in circulation at the end of 1920, compared to 6000 million in 1914). Consumer prices doubled between 1922 and 1926, and the franc suffered continual devaluation (in 1914 one British Pound was worth 25 francs, by July 1926 one Pound was worth 243 francs). The devaluation of the franc was a boon for exports, while inflation reduced the debt burden. As a result, "most social groups seem to have enjoyed rising real incomes, in the case of workers for example by somewhere between 9 and 26 per cent." The government of Raymond Poincaré, which came to power in July 1926, managed to stabilize France's financial situation by reducing government expenditure, raising interest rates, raising taxes, and returning in part to the gold standard in June 1928. This placed the value of the franc at one-fifth of its pre-war level, which kept French goods competitive internationally.

=== Great Depression ===
The worldwide decline after 1929 affected France a bit later than other countries, hitting around 1931. The depression was relatively mild: unemployment peaked under 5%, the fall in production was at most 20% below the 1929 output; and there was no banking crisis like the panics in other countries. But the depression also lasted longer in France than in most other countries. Like many other countries, France had introduced the gold standard in the nineteenth century, meaning that it was generally possible to exchange bank notes for gold. Other countries abandoned the gold standard, like Great Britain in 1931, but France stuck to it until 1936, which caused a number of problems in times of recession and deflation. France lost competitiveness relative to Great Britain, because the latter was able to offer its products at a cheaper price due to the devaluation of its currency after leaving the gold standard. Furthermore, terminating fixed exchange rate regimes opened up opportunities for expansive monetary policy and thus influenced consumers’ expectations of future inflation, which was crucial for domestic demand. The French economy only started to recover when France abandoned the gold standard.

However, the depression had some effects on the local economy, and partly explains the February 6, 1934 riots and even more the formation of the Popular Front, led by SFIO socialist leader Léon Blum, which won the elections in 1936.

France's relatively high degree of self-sufficiency meant the damage was considerably less than in nations like Germany.

=== Popular Front: 1936 ===
Hardship and unemployment were high enough to lead to rioting and the rise of the socialist Popular Front, which won the 1936 elections with a coalition of Socialists and Radicals, and support from the Communists. Léon Blum became the first Socialist prime minister.

The election brought a massive wave of strikes, involving two million workers, who seized many factories and stores. The strikes were spontaneous and unorganized, but nevertheless the business community panicked and met secretly with Blum, who negotiated a series of reforms, and then gave labor unions the credit for the Matignon Accords. The new laws:

- confirmed the right to strike
- generalised collective bargaining
- enacted the law mandating 12 days of paid annual leave
- enacted the law limiting the working week to 40 hours (outside of overtime)
- raised wages (15% for the lowest-paid workers, and 7% for the relatively well-paid)
- stipulated that employers would recognise shop stewards.
- ensured that there would be no retaliation against strikers.
- created a national Office du blé (Grain Board or Wheat Office, through which the government helped to market agricultural produce at fair prices for farmers) to stabilise prices and curb speculation
- nationalised the arms industries
- made loans to small and medium-sized industries
- began a major public works programme
- raised the pay, pensions, and allowances of public-sector workers
- The 1920 Sales Tax, opposed by the Left as a tax on consumers, was abolished and replaced by a production tax, which was considered to be a tax on the producer instead of the consumer.

Blum persuaded the workers to accept pay raises and go back to work. Wages increased sharply; in two years the national average was up 48 percent. However inflation also rose 46%. The imposition of the 40-hour week proved highly inefficient, as industry had a difficult time adjusting to it. The economic confusion hindered the rearmament effort, and the rapid growth of German armaments alarmed Blum. He launched a major program to speed up arms production. The cost forced the abandonment of the social reform programs of the popular front had counted heavily on.

==== Legacy of the Popular Front ====
Economic historians point to numerous bad financial and economic policies, such as delayed devaluation of the franc, which made French exports uncompetitive. Economists especially emphasize the bad effects of the 40-hour week, which made overtime illegal, forcing employers to stop work or to replace their best workers with inferior and less experienced workers when that 40-hour limit was reached. More generally the argument is made that France could not afford the labor reforms, in the face of poor economic conditions, the fears of the business community and the threat of Nazi Germany.

Some historians have judged the Popular Front a failure in terms of economics, foreign policy, and long-term political stability. "Disappointment and failure," says Jackson, "was the legacy of the Popular Front." However, it did inspire later reformers who set up the modern French welfare state.

=== Vichy France, 1940–1944 ===
Conditions in Vichy France under German occupation were very harsh. The Germans stripped France of millions of workers (as prisoners of war and "voluntary" workers), and of the food supply, while also demanding heavy cash payments. It was a period of severe economic hardship under a totalitarian government.

Vichy rhetoric exalted the skilled laborer and small businessman. In practice, however, the needs of artisans for raw materials were neglected in favor of large businesses. The General Committee for the Organization of Commerce (CGOC) was a national program to modernize and professionalize small business.

In 1940 the government took direct control of all production, which was synchronized with the demands of the Germans. It replaced free trade unions with compulsory state unions that dictated labor policy without regard to the voice or needs of the workers. The centralized, bureaucratic control of the French economy was not a success, as German demands grew heavier and more unrealistic, passive resistance and inefficiencies multiplied, and Allied bombers hit the rail yards; however, Vichy made the first comprehensive long-range plans for the French economy. The government had never before attempted a comprehensive overview. De Gaulle's Provisional Government in 1944–45, quietly used the Vichy plans as a base for its own reconstruction program. The Monnet Plan of 1946 was closely based on Vichy plans. Thus both teams of wartime and early postwar planners repudiated prewar laissez-faire practices and embraced the cause of drastic economic overhaul and a planned economy.

==== Forced labor ====
Nazi Germany kept nearly a million French Army POWs as forced laborers throughout the war. They added workers from occupied nations, especially in metal factories. The shortage of volunteers led the Vichy government to pass a law in September 1941 that effectively deported workers to Germany, where they constituted 17% of the labor force by August 1943. The largest number worked in the giant Krupp steel works in Essen. Low pay, long hours, frequent bombings, and crowded air raid shelters added to the unpleasantness of poor housing, inadequate heating, limited food, and poor medical care, all compounded by harsh Nazi discipline. They finally returned home in the summer of 1945. The forced labour draft encouraged the French Resistance and undermined the Vichy government.

==== Food shortages ====
Civilians suffered shortages of all varieties of consumer goods. The rationing system was stringent but badly mismanaged, leading malnourishment, black markets, and hostility to state management of the food supply. The Germans seized about 20% of French food production, which caused severe disruption to the household economy of the French people. French farm production fell in half because of lack of fuel, fertilizer and workers; even so the Germans seized half the meat, 20 percent of the produce, and 2 percent of the champagne. Supply problems quickly affected French stores which lacked most items. The government answered by rationing, but German officials set the policies and hunger prevailed, especially affecting youth in urban areas. The queues lengthened in front of shops. Some people—including German soldiers—benefited from the black market, where food was sold without tickets at very high prices. Farmers especially diverted meat to the black market, which meant that much less for the open market. Counterfeit food tickets were also in circulation. Direct buying from farmers in the countryside and barter against cigarettes became common. These activities were strictly forbidden, however, and thus carried out at the risk of confiscation and fines. Food shortages were most acute in the large cities. In the more remote country villages, however, clandestine slaughtering, vegetable gardens and the availability of milk products permitted better survival rates. The official ration provided starvation level diets of 1300 or fewer calories a day, supplemented by home gardens and, especially, black market purchases.

== From 1944 ==
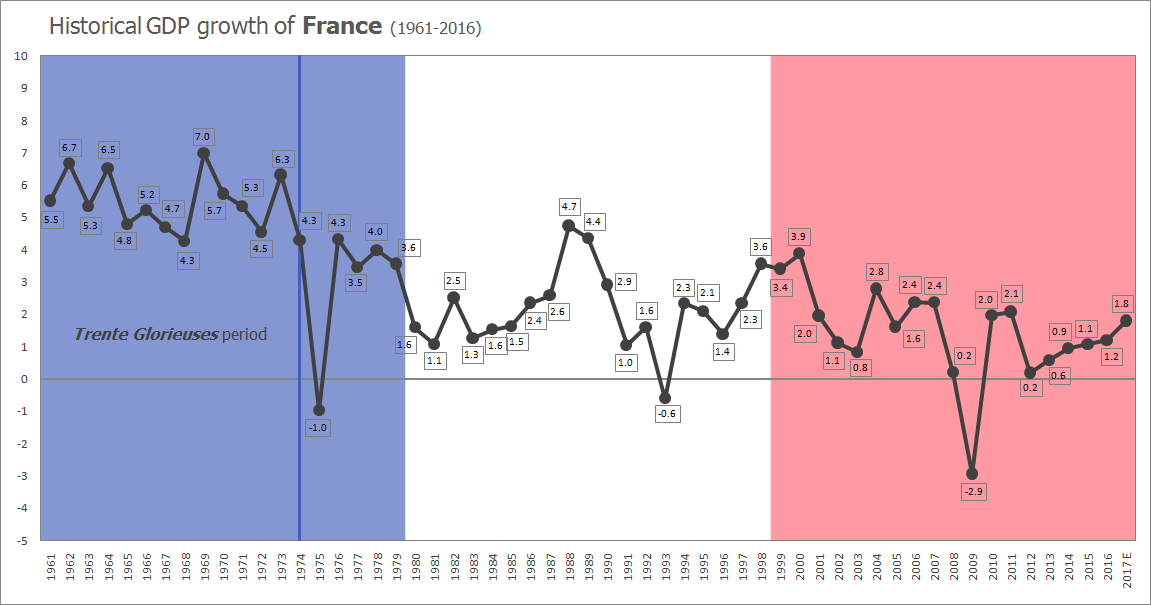
Historical GDP growth of France from 1961 to 2016 and the latter part of Les Trente Glorieuses

The hardships of wartime and the immediate post-war period were succeeded by a period of steady economic development, in France, now often fondly recalled there as The Thirty Glorious Years (Les Trente Glorieuses). Alternating policies of "interventionist" and "free market" ideas enabled the French to build a society in which both industrial and technological advances could be made but also worker security and privileges were also established and protected. In 1946 France signed a treaty with US that waived a large part of its debt. Known as The Blum-Byrnes agreement (French: accord Blum-Byrnes) a French-American agreement signed May 28, 1946 by Secretary of State James F. Byrnes and Léon Blum and Jean Monnet. This agreement erased part of the French debt to the United States after the Second World War (2 billion dollars).

By the end of the 20th century, France was once again among the leading economic powers of the world, although by the year 2000 there was some fraying around the edges: people in France and elsewhere were asking whether France alone, without becoming even more an integral part of a pan-European economy, would have sufficient market presence to maintain its position, and worker security and privileges, in an increasingly globalized and transnational economic world.

=== Reconstruction and the welfare state ===
Reconstruction began at the end of the war in 1945, and confidence in the future came back. With the baby boom (which had started as soon as 1942) the birthrate surged rapidly. It took several years to repair the damage caused by the war – battles and bombing had destroyed several cities, factories, bridges, and railway infrastructure. Some 1,200,000 buildings were destroyed or damaged.

In 1945, the provisional government of the French Republic, led by Charles de Gaulle and made up of communists, socialists and gaullists, nationalized key economic sectors (energy, air transport, savings banks, assurances) and big companies (e.g. Renault), with the creation of Social Security and of works councils. A welfare state was set up. Economic planning was initiated with the Commissariat général du Plan in 1946, led by Jean Monnet. The first "Plan de modernisation et d’équipement", for the 1947-1952 period, focused on basic economic activities (energy, steel, cement, transports, agriculture equipment); the second plan (1954–1957) had broader aims: housing construction, urban development, scientific research, manufacturing industries.

The debts left over from the First World War, whose payment had been suspended since 1931, were renegotiated in the Blum-Byrnes agreement of 1946. The U.S. forgave all $2.8 billion in debt, and gave France a new loan of $650 million. In return French negotiator Jean Monnet set out the French five-year plan for recovery and development. American films were now allowed in French cinemas three weeks per month.

=== Nationalized industries ===
The nationalization of major industries took place in the 1930s and 1940s but was never complete. The railways were nationalized in 1937 because they were losing money, but were strategically important. Likewise, the aeronautics and armaments industries were nationalized. During the war, the Vichy government froze wages, froze prices, controlled external trade, and supervise the distribution of raw materials to the manufacturing sector. The French economy accepted increasing levels of nationalization without major political opposition. After the war, the power industry, gas, and electricity were nationalized in 1946, with the goal of bringing increased efficiency. Banking and insurance were nationalized along with iron and steel. However, oil was not considered so important and was not nationalized. The enlarged role of government necessitated systematic national planning, which was a key feature of the postwar industries.

=== The Monnet Plan and economic recovery ===
Although the economic situation in France was very grim in 1945, resources did exist and the economy regained normal growth by the 1950s. The US government had planned a major aid program, but it unexpectedly ended Lend Lease in late summer 1945, and additional aid was stymied by Congress in 1945–46. However, there were $2 billion in American loans. France managed to regain its international status thanks to a successful production strategy, a demographic spurt, and technical and political innovations. Conditions varied from firm to firm. Some had been destroyed or damaged, nationalized or requisitioned, but the majority carried on, sometimes working harder and more efficiently than before the war. Industries were reorganized on a basis that ranged from consensual (electricity) to conflictual (machine tools), therefore producing uneven results. Despite strong American pressure through the Marshall Plan (officially, the European Recovery Plan), there was little change in the organization and content of the training for French industrial managers. This was mainly due to the reticence of the existing institutions and the struggle among different economic and political interest groups for control over efforts to improve the further training of practitioners.

The Monnet Plan provided a coherent framework for economic policy, and it was strongly supported by the Marshall Plan. It was inspired by moderate, Keynesian free-trade ideas rather than state control. Although relaunched in an original way, the French economy was about as productive as comparable West European countries.

The United States helped revive the French economy with the Marshall Plan whereby it gave France $2.3 billion with no repayment. France agreed to reduce trade barriers and modernize its management system. The total of all American grants and credits to France, 1946–53, came to $4.9 billion, and low-interest loans added another $2 billion. The Marshall Plan set up intensive tours of American industry. France sent 500 missions with 4700 businessmen and experts to tour American factories, farms, stores and offices. They were especially impressed with the prosperity of American workers, and how they could purchase an inexpensive new automobile for nine months' work, compared to 30 months in France. Some French businesses resisted Americanization, but others seized upon it to attract American investments and build a larger market. The industries that were most Americanized included chemicals, oil, electronics, and instrumentation. They were the most innovative, and most profitable sectors.

Claude Fohlen argues that:

In all then, France received 7,000 million dollars, which were used either to finance the imports needed to get the economy off the ground again or to implement the Monnet Plan....Without the Marshall Plan, however, the economic recovery would have been a much slower process – particularly in France, where American aid provided funds for the Monnet Plan and thereby restored equilibrium in the equipment industries, which govern the recovery of consumption, and opened the way... To continuing further growth. This growth was affected by a third factor... decolonization.

=== Les Trente Glorieuses: 1947–1973 ===
Between 1947 and 1973, France went through a booming period (5% per year in average) dubbed by Jean Fourastié Trente Glorieuses, title of a book published in 1979. Between 1946 and the end of the 1960s, the population grew by a record 30%. By 1967, one in three adults was under the age of 20. Population growth was due not only to a higher birth rate, but to a declining mortality rate fueled by improvements in medical care, housing, and nutrition. The infant mortality rate fell from 52.0 in 1950 to 18.2 in 1970. The economic growth was mainly due to productivity gains and to an increase in the number of working hours. Indeed, the working population was growing very slowly, the baby boom being offset by the extension of the time dedicated to studies. Investment as a percentage of GNP rose from around 20% per annum in the 1950s to a peak of 24.7% in 1974, the highest in Europe. Because of currency controls and "the limited mobility of international capital", lenders invested at home and not abroad. Investment fueled continual improvements in production methods, making products like automobiles more affordable for average people.

Through "indicative planning" the French government used its power to direct investment towards targeted industries, regions, and specific products. The state was concerned with stimulating continuous modernization and restructuring, which it encouraged through communication improvements, tax policy, export credits, and ensuring access to cheap loans for firms. Projects and industries considered to be of "strategic national importance" could also count on support from the French state. These included the nuclear power program, the armaments industry, infrastructure, and the aerospace industry.

During the 1950s agricultural productivity soared. France went from being an importer of food to meet the needs of its population, to self-sufficiency and surplus output. The third Modernization Plan of 1957-1961 put an emphasis on investing in the staple agricultural products of Northern France and the Paris region: meat, milk, cheese, wheat, and sugar. The desire to find export markets for this surplus was an important factor in the French decision to join the European Economic Community in 1957. France won concessions like price supports, income supports for farmers, and a commitment from its fellow member nations to buy up French agricultural surpluses. In exchange, the country eliminated tariffs and opened its market to German non-agricultural exports. Tariffs between EEC nations were eliminated in practice by 1968, and the economy and French consumers benefited from imports of Italian domestic appliances like refrigerators and washing machines, or machine tools from West Germany. EEC membership resulted in structural change, high levels of growth, soaring levels of trade between France and her EEC partners, and high levels of investment. Businessmen and farmers experienced some difficulty in adapting to the greater competition and homogeneity of the common market. The "stimulus to change" from membership was most effective in industries with a comparative advantage: agriculture, food processing, aircraft and automobile manufacturing. The importance of third-world markets in the French colonial Empire waned as the economy restructured to meet the demands of a more dynamic European market for high quality goods. In the late 1950s, the "franc area" was the destination for over 25% of French exports, twenty years later it was only 5%.

Productivity gains came from the catching up with the United States. In 1950, the average income in France was 55% of an American and reached 80% in 1973. Between 1960 and 1975, income per capita almost doubled. Among the major nations, only Japan and Spain had faster growth in this era than France. The national government's industrial policy was used to bolster French industries.

Insisting that the period was not that of an economic miracle, but a mere catching up following an economic lag, French historian Jacques Marseille noted that if the economy had constantly grown at the same rate as that of the « Belle Époque », the wealth would have been the same at the beginning of the 1970s as that actually reached after the Trente glorieuses.

==== Rural living ====
With government support, active farmers bought out their neighbors, enlarge their properties, and use the latest in mechanization, new seeds, fertilizers, and new techniques. The result was a revolution in agricultural output, as well as a sharply reduced number of active farmers from 7.4 million in 1946 to only 2 million in 1975. It also resulted in millions of empty old farm houses. They were promptly purchased and upgraded by Frenchmen who wanted a rural retreat away from the frenzy of their primary work in the cities. For many it was in nostalgia for family memories of rural living that drew the city dwellers back to the countryside. By 1978, France was the world leader in per capita ownership of second homes and L’Express reported an "irresistible infatuation of the French for the least Norman thatched house, Cévenol sheep barn or the most modest Provençal farmhouse."

=== The economic crisis ===
By the late 1960s, France's economic growth, while strong, was beginning to lose steam. Due to the impact of the 1968 social upheaval on the French economy, speculators bet against the French franc. The financial pressure from currency outflows led the government to devalue the franc against the German mark and the US dollar in 1969.

The Trente glorieuses era ended with the worldwide 1973 oil crisis, which increased costs in energy and thus on production. Economic instability marked the Giscard d'Estaing government (1974-1981). Giscard turned to Prime Minister Raymond Barre in 1976, who advocated numerous complex, strict policies ("Barre Plans"). The first Barre plan emerged on 22 September 1976, with a priority to stop inflation. It included a 3-month price freeze; a reduction in the value added tax; wage controls; salary controls; a reduction of the growth in the money supply; and increases in the income tax, automobile taxes, luxury taxes and bank rates. There were measures to restore the trade balance, and support the growth of the economy and employment. Oil imports, whose price had shot up, were limited. There was special aid to exports, and an action fund was set up to aid industries. There was increased financial aid to farmers, who were suffering from a drought, and for social security. The package was not very popular, but was pursued with vigor.

Economic troubles continued into the early years of the presidency of François Mitterrand. A recession in the early 1980s, which led to the abandonment of dirigisme in favour of a more pragmatic approach to economic intervention. Growth resumed later in the decade, only to be slowed down by the economic depression of the early 1990s, which affected the Socialist Party. Liberalisation under Jacques Chirac in the late 1990s strengthened the economy. However, after 2005 the world economy stagnated and the 2008 global crisis and its effects in both the Eurozone and France itself dogged the conservative government of Nicolas Sarkozy, who lost reelection in 2012 against Socialist Francois Hollande.

France's recent economic history has been less turbulent than in many other countries. The average income in France, after having been steady for a long time, increased elevenfold between 1700 and 1975, which constitutes a 0.9% growth rate per year, a rate which has been outdone almost every year since 1975: By the early Eighties, for instance, wages in France were on or slightly above the EEC average.

=== The financial crisis of 2008 and aftermath ===
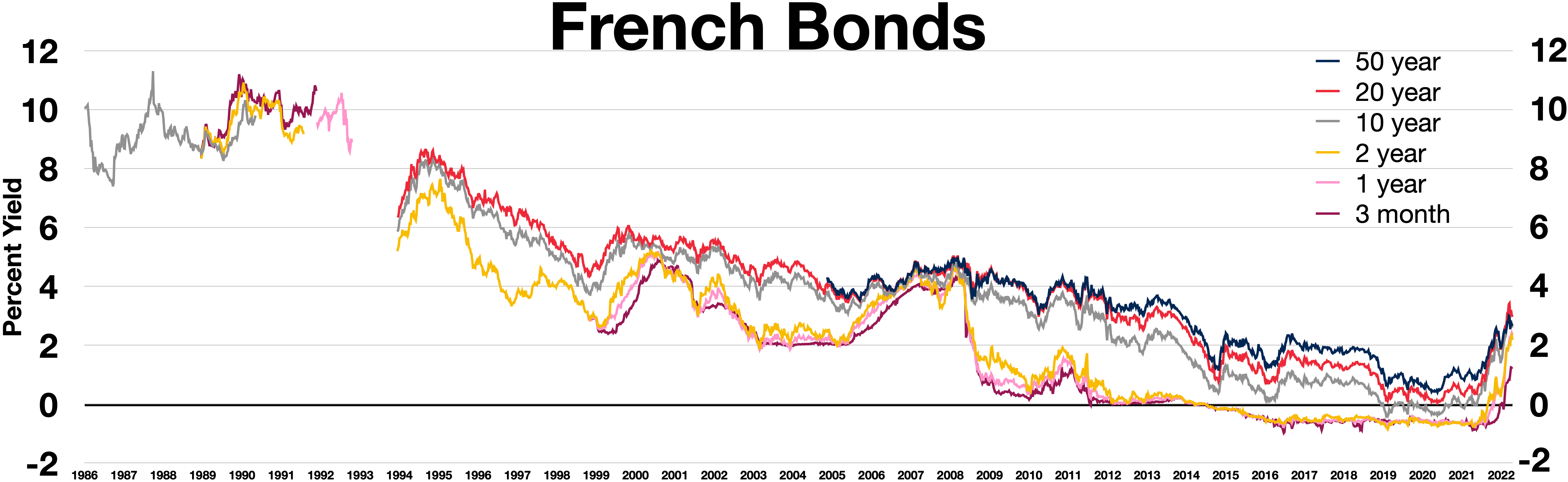
French bonds 50 year 20 year 10 year 2 year 1 year 3 month

France, like a number of countries, was affected by the 2008 financial crisis. However, during the worst part of the crisis, between 2008 and 2010, France fared better than other industrialized countries. For example, the Euro zone's overall GDP decreased by 4 percent, while France's GDP only decreased by 2.2 percent. This resilience is linked to France's social protection system, which, through the transfers it organizes (47 percent of gross disposable household income in 2007) equips France with strong economic stabilizers. However, these stabilizers weigh inversely on recovery. Starting in 2012, many countries experienced economic recoveries, where the analysis of the indicators of economic activity in France do not show a clear recovery, or rather do not show an increased growth during this time.

=== Since 2012 ===
In April and May 2012, France held a presidential election in which the winner François Hollande had opposed austerity measures, promising to eliminate France's budget deficit by 2017. The new government stated that it aimed to cancel recently enacted tax cuts and exemptions for the wealthy, raising the top tax bracket rate to 75% on incomes over a million euros, restoring the retirement age to 60 with a full pension for those who have worked 42 years, restoring 60,000 jobs recently cut from public education, regulating rent increases; and building additional public housing for the poor.

In June 2012, Hollande's Socialist Party won an overall majority in the legislative elections, giving it the capability to amend the French Constitution and allowing immediate enactment of the promised reforms. French government bond interest rates fell 30% to record lows, less than 50 basis points above German government bond rates.

Hollande's successor as President of France, Emmanuel Macron, a centrist politician, took office in May 2017. His aim was to revive the euro zone's second-largest economy.

In July 2020, during the COVID-19 pandemic, the French government issued 10-years bonds which had negative interest rates, for the first time in its history (which means that investors buying French bonds will pay, rather than receive, interest for owning French sovereign debt).

France possesses in 2020 the fourth-largest gold reserves in the world. In April 2022, France's incumbent president, Emmanuel Macron, was re-elected.

President Macron vowed in May 2023 to build factories, boost job creations and make France more independent, shaked by pension protests. The background of the pension reform was about 14% of GDP pension spending in France compared to OECD average of just over 9%. The aim of the 2023 pension reform was to reduce cost by increasing the minimum legal retirement age from 62 years to 64 years in 2030. In April 2023, president Emmanuel Macron signed the pension reforms into law.

== See also ==
- French peasants
- Economic planning in France
