= List of tariffs in Germany =

This is a list of German tariffs.

- 1834: Zollverein
- 1879: German tariff of 1879
- 1885: German tariff of 1885
- 1887: German tariff of 1887
- 1902: German tariff of 1902
- 1925: German tariff of 1925
- 1968: European Economic Community (Common External Tariff completed 1 July)
