= German tariff of 1887 =

The German tariff of 1887 was a protectionist law passed by the Reichstag (under the guidance of Chancellor Otto von Bismarck) that raised tariffs on agricultural imports into Imperial Germany. It became law on 21 December 1887.

The tariff of 1885 had raised the duties on wheat and rye to 3 marks per 100kg, with those on oats and barley raised to 1.50 marks. The price of wheat in Prussia in 1886 was 33s.7d. per imperial quarter, in 1887 it was 35s.2d. per imperial quarter. In 1886 the price of rye in Prussia was 6s.9d. per cwt.; in 1887 it was 6s.3d.

Bismarck had requested a wheat and rye duty of 6 marks, but the Reichstag voted for 5 marks. Many of the duties in the tariff were lowered by commercial treaties with Austria-Hungary and Italy negotiated by Bismarck's successor Leo von Caprivi.

== Rates ==
The duties on wheat and rye were raised to 5 marks per 100kg; on oats 4 marks; on barley 2.25 marks; on maize 2 marks; on flour 10.50 marks. The duties on butter, cheese, eggs, meat, bullocks, cows, pigs and wine remained unchanged.
