= List of tariffs in the United Kingdom =

This is a list of British tariffs.

- 1764: Sugar Act
- 1765: Customs, etc. Act 1765
- 1767: Townshend Acts
- 1778: Taxation of Colonies Act 1778
- 1815: Corn Laws
- 1860: Cobden–Chevalier Treaty
- 1931: Abnormal Importations (Customs Duties) Act 1931
- 1931: Horticultural Products (Emergency Customs Duties) Act 1931
- 1932: Import Duties Act 1932
