= French tariff of 1887 =

The French tariff of 1887 was a protectionist law passed by the National Assembly of the French Third Republic that imposed tariffs. It became law on 29 March 1885.

The 1885 tariff had increased the wheat duty to 3 francs per 100 kg. The farmers had requested a duty of 5 francs and as soon as the 1885 law was passed they agitated for an increase. They claimed that home-grown produce could not cover its costs at the current price. The duty on wheat was increased to 5 francs per 100 kg; on oats to 3 francs; on flour to 8 francs; on beef and pork 12 francs, on bullocks 38 francs per head, on cows 20 francs per head. The duties on barley, butter, cheese, eggs, pigs and wine remained unchanged from 1885.
