= Blum–Byrnes agreement =

Commercial agreements between France and the United States

The Blum–Byrnes agreements (French: accord Blum-Byrnes) were a series of commercial French–American agreements, signed May 28, 1946, by the Secretary of State James F. Byrnes and representatives of the French government Léon Blum and, especially, Jean Monnet. The agreements aimed to eradicate France's debt to America and obtain new credit in exchange for opening France's markets to American products, especially film productions.

== Pre-agreement conditions ==
French cinema was protected against foreign competition by a numerical quota system limiting the number of foreign films shown per year. Between 1936 and 1940, only 188 foreign (mostly American) films were allowed each year. Starting from 1940, films from non-Axis countries were banned under the German Occupation. The French cinema industry flourished under these conditions and in 1945 was the second-largest industry (in terms of employment numbers) in France, second only to the railways. Meanwhile, the overall economy of France faltered in the post-war years. The economy reached an all-time low by the summer of 1947.

== Provisions ==
The agreement erased the 2.8 billion dollars France owed the U.S., chiefly from World War I loans and loans in 1939–40. Monnet set out the French five-year plan for recovery and development. The U.S. loaned France $650 million at low interest through the Export-Import Bank. The loan was followed in 1948 by a free grant of $2.3 billion from the Marshall Plan, with no repayment. In exchange, French cinemas would replace the numerical quota with a "screen quota". This meant that French cinemas were required to show French-made films for four weeks out of every thirteen and leave the other nine weeks of every quarter open to free competition, namely from American films.

=== Amendments and Related Legislation ===
On September 23, 1948, the National Assembly revised the agreements so that French cinema had to reserve five weeks out of every thirteen weeks for French-made films. Numerical quotas were also reintroduced. 121 dubbed American films and 65 other foreign films were permitted each year with exceptions for countries that made significant efforts to import and distribute French films. The revisions also called for extra state aid to the French film industry. This request for financial aid was realized on September 23, 1948, with the introduction of a new program where taxes were imposed on movie tickets and the tax revenues were distributed to French film producers. In this way, American film sales helped the French film industry.

== French reception ==
Politicians, the movie industry, and the press cried out at the Blum-Byrnes loan's condition of international free market competition in the French film industry. They argued that the American productions would hurt an already war-injured French film industry. With the backlog of over 2000 American films that were banned during the German Occupation, American films were able to quickly flood the French cinemas. Committees for the Defense of the French Film were organized to draw attention to the argument that the agreement's motive was to make France a "free market" for dumping US films. On January 4, 1948, a demonstration of thousands of technicians, writers, and actors including Simone Signoret, Jean Marais, Raymond Bussieres, Madeleine Sologne, Jacques Becker, and Louis Daquin was organized and led to the subsequent revision of the agreements (as discussed in the previous section). The Center national de la cinematographie was created on October 25, 1946, to help organize and finance the French film industry. The CNC made several efforts to help support the French cinemas, including the tax program introduced in September 1948 (as discussed in the previous section). Franco-Italian agreements were signed to increase coproduction between the two countries. These coproduced films began to flourish after 1946. The Blum-Byrnes loan also awarded the French less than they wanted, and less than the British had received, further complicating Franco-American relations. Overall, the French saw the agreement as a threat to their film industry and acted to mitigate the agreement's effects.

== American reception ==
The agreement was seen as a way to "spread the American way of life" though a war-torn France (and Europe at large). It was also an effective way to promote free trade and the Hollywood industry. The US government also envisioned that these measures would eliminate all protection of the French film industry once the industry has recovered its competitiveness. The agreements were impactful and allowed for large numbers of American films to be shown in France. In the first half of 1947, 340 American films were shown compared to 40 French ones. Many American films had already amortized their costs during the period when they were banned in France and were thus able to be sold cheaply abroad for more profit. The French film industry responded to the challenge with new vigor. To further the cultural propagation effect of the Blum–Byrnes agreements, the informational Media Guaranty Program was established in 1948 as part of the Economic Cooperation Administration to "guarantee that the US government would convert certain foreign currencies into dollars at attractive rates, provided the information materials earning the moneys reflected appropriate elements of American life". This allowed American films to be shown to an even broader audience. The US gained a total of 16 million dollars from this program.
