= French tariff of 1885 =

The French tariff of 1885 was a protectionist law passed by the National Assembly of the French Third Republic that imposed tariffs. It became law on 28 March 1885.

Under the 1881 tariff, wheat was subject to a duty of 0.60 francs per 100kg. A combination of foreign competition and bad harvests had caused a growth in grain imports since 1879. Grain prices declined from 22 francs per hectoliter in 1881 to 16 francs in 1885. The Société des agriculteurs de France and the Association de l'industrie française combined to pressure the government into increasing tariffs. The agriculturists held a series of national agricultural conventions to rally farmers to protection, beginning in November 1884. The farmers requested a duty of 5 francs. The Minister of Agriculture, Jules Méline, was supportive but the Chamber of Deputies voted for a duty of 3 francs.

== Rates ==
The duty on wheat was raised to 3 francs per 100kg; on oats and barley 1.50 francs; on flour 6 francs; on beef and pork 7 francs; on bullocks 25 francs per head; on cows 12 francs per head and on pigs 6 francs per head. The duties on butter, cheese, eggs and wine remained unchanged from 1881.
