= German tariff of 1885 =

The German tariff of 1885 was a protectionist law passed by the Reichstag (under the guidance of Chancellor Otto von Bismarck) that raised tariffs on agricultural imports into Imperial Germany. It became law on 22 May 1885.

The tariff of 1879 had imposed a duty of 1 mark per 100kg on wheat, rye and oats. However, this had failed to prevent the fall in grain prices. The price of wheat in Prussia had fallen from 46s.10d. per imperial quarter in 1880 to 34s.8d. per imperial quarter in 1885. In 1880 the price of rye in Prussia was 9s.8d. per cwt.; in 1885 it was 7s.2d. Germany had also lost most of its grain export markets. The agrarian party had grown in strength, and they complained of foreign competition and demanded protection for Germany's food supply, which they argued was vital in wartime.

== Rates ==
The duties on wheat and rye were raised to 3 marks per 100kg; on oats 1.50 marks; on barley 1.50 marks; on maize 1 mark; on flour 7.50 marks; on meat 20 marks; on bullocks 30 marks; on cows 9 marks; on pigs 6 marks. The duties on butter (20 marks), cheese (20 marks), eggs (3 marks) and wine (24 marks) remained unchanged from 1879.
