= French tariff of 1881 =

The French tariff of 1881 was a tariff passed by the National Assembly of the French Third Republic that became law on 7 May 1881.

The Minister of Agriculture and Commerce, Marie Camille Alfred, vicomte de Meaux, relied on the ministry's secretary, Jules Ozenne, and the general director of customs, Léon Amé, to help formulate the government's tariff policy. They wished to retain and extend the free trade policies of the Second French Empire by lowering the protectionist duties in France's general tariff to the level of the conventional tariff in France's commercial treaties. This new general tariff would then be used to negotiate trade treaties that would lower the conventional tariff.

Meaux announced the government's intention to devise a new tariff in a circular of 7 April 1875. He also appealed for the advice on tariff levels from France's chambers of commerce. 54 chambers responded, with a majority favouring replacing the ad valorem duties with fixed duties and with all of them supporting making the existing conventional tariff the new general tariff. In March 1876 Meaux ordered the Conseil supérieur du commerce to draft a bill that would determine tariff levels. In February 1877 the bill was submitted to the Chamber of Deputies: it abolished all protective duties and in the majority of duties it made the old minimum duties the maximum that could be levied. However, the Seize Mai crisis led to the bill being withdrawn.

In March 1878 the Chamber appointed a commission (under the chairmanship of Jules Ferry) to report on a tariff bill. This deliberated until March 1879. Ferry called the commission "the most complete, the most practical, the best controlled, in a word, the most serious [inquiry] that has ever taken place". Another request for input from the chambers of commerce again led to 54 responses between April and August 1878. These revealed protectionism's growing popularity since 1875, with half favouring duties higher than those desired by the government. In December 1879 the commission submitted its moderately protectionist tariff bill to the Chamber.

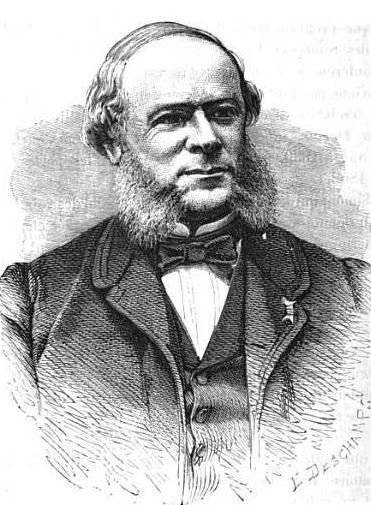
Augustin Pouyer-Quertier

The debate was divided between free traders who argued for a low general tariff and a new conventional tariff, against the protectionists who favoured a prohibitive tariff if and when the commercial treaties expired. In June 1878 the Free Trade Association was founded. On 1 May 1879 the protectionists held a congress (chaired by Augustin Pouyer-Quertier) in the Grand Hotel in Paris, with over 100 delegates representing the chambers of commerce, senators, deputies and officers of the Association de l'industrie française. Both sides campaigned to win over public opinion in the propaganda war fought across the country. Pouyer-Quertier wished to convert the French farmer to protection in the hope that they would support tariffs for industry in return for tariffs for agriculture.

In the Chamber the debate on the bill started on 30 January 1880, with lobbyists from both sides congregating in Paris to influence the vote. An agreement between the industrial protectionists and the farmers' bloc to support protection broke down when the industrialists, mistrusting their agricultural allies, failed to vote for agricultural protection. In the voting on the clauses of the bill in the Chamber, the free traders achieved their main goal in defeating the higher tariffs for industrial goods favoured by the commission.

In the Senate the protectionists again dominated the commission appointed to examine the bill, with the result that their bill resembled the protectionist one drafted by the Chamber's commission. The main difference, however, reflected a renewed attempt at industrial-agricultural co-operation: this time agriculture received higher rates of protection than before. The Senate began debating the bill on 15 February 1881, with voting commencing on 19 February. Again, the industrial-agricultural alliance broke down. This time, however, it was the agriculturists who broke ranks: despite the industrialists voting for agricultural protection the agriculturists voted against the duty on textiles.

In the end, industry failed to receive the protection it campaigned for: the general tariff for manufacturers was raised by 24 per cent. and fixed at a specific level rather than ad valorem. Agriculture received less protection than industry but the agriculturists managed to raise livestock duties and they also ensured that agricultural duties could not be lowered in any future commercial treaty. Overall, the law was a victory for free traders.

== Rates ==
The duty on wheat was 0.60 francs per 100kg; for flour 1.20 francs; butter 13 francs; cheese 8 francs; eggs 10 francs; beef and pork 3 francs; bullocks 15 francs; cows 8 francs; pigs 3 francs and wine 8 francs. Oats and barley were admitted duty free. Raw materials were either admitted duty free or subject to a small duty.
