= Cobden–Chevalier Treaty =

1860 free trade agreement between Great Britain and France

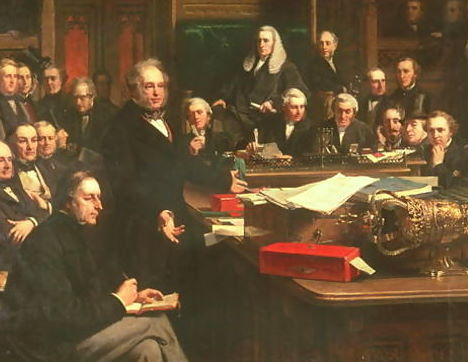
- Lord Palmerston addressing the House of Commons during the debates on the Cobden–Chevalier Treaty in February 1860, as painted by John Phillip (1863)
- Signed: October 23, 1860
- Original signatories: United Kingdom, France

The Cobden–Chevalier Treaty was an Anglo-French free trade agreement signed between the United Kingdom and France on 23 January 1860. After Britain began free trade policies in 1846, there remained tariffs with France. The 1860 treaty ended tariffs on the main items of trade—wine, brandy and silk goods from France, and coal, iron and industrial goods from Britain.

The new policy was widely copied across Europe. According to Stephen Krasner, the treaty set off a "golden age of free trade" in Europe, which lasted until the late 1870s. It was the first of eight "most favoured nation" treaties the British negotiated in the 1860s. By the 1880s, however, the rise of protectionism in Germany, the United States and elsewhere made the treaty less relevant. It was the first modern free trade agreement.

It is named after the main British and French originators of the treaty, Richard Cobden MP and Michel Chevalier.

== Origins and negotiations ==
In a Parliamentary session of 1859, Cobden's friend and political ally John Bright asked why, instead of spending money on armaments against a possible French invasion, did not the British government attempt to persuade French Emperor Napoleon III to trade freely with Britain. Upon reading this speech Chevalier wrote to Cobden and arranged to meet him in England. He discovered that Cobden was planning to visit Paris for family reasons in the winter. Chevalier urged Cobden to meet with the emperor to try to persuade him of the benefits of free trade. In September, Cobden visited Chancellor of the Exchequer William Ewart Gladstone and they both agreed that a commercial treaty between Britain and France was a good idea.

After talks with Chevalier and French Minister of Commerce Eugène Rouher in Paris, Cobden had his first audience with the emperor on 27 October 1859. They discussed free trade and the Emperor informed him that he could alter tariffs by decree if it were part of an international treaty but that he was worried that free trade would throw French workers out of their jobs. Cobden replied that free trade tended to increase rather than diminish the demand for labour and that because of his tariff reforms Sir Robert Peel came to have great fame and reputation in Britain. The Emperor replied: "I am charmed and flattered at the idea of performing a similar work in my country; but it is very difficult in France to make reforms; we make revolutions in France, not reforms".

On 9 December, Chevalier told Cobden that Rouher had drawn up a plan for a commercial treaty which would be submitted for approval by the emperor the next day. However, the Emperor was concerned over the definite advantages France would gain in adopting free trade: Britain was so dependent on trade that she was constantly in fear of war whilst France could endure war with much less inconvenience. Persigny, the French ambassador to Britain, warned the Emperor that war with Britain was a real possibility unless some kind of alliance with Britain was signed, and that with such an alliance in being it did not matter what other European states thought. Rouher presented the Emperor with his commercial plan with sixty pages of favourable arguments, which the Emperor approved. The Emperor announced the treaty in a letter published on 15 January 1860 and it caused fury among the protectionist interests.

Princeton University economist Gene Grossman described the treaty as the "first modern trade agreement." According to Stephen Krasner, the treaty set off a "golden age of free trade".

== Signing ==
On 23 January 1860 at the British Foreign Office, the plenipotentiaries of both nations signed and sealed the treaty. Lord Cowley, the British Ambassador to France, and Cobden signed on behalf of Britain, and Jules Baroche, the French Foreign Minister, and Rouher for France. However, it was then discovered that it had been written in the treaty of English coke and coal rather than British, and harbour when it was meant shipping. The treaty was re-written and signed and sealed on 29 January.

== Effects ==
The treaty reduced French duties on most British manufactured goods to levels not above 30% and reduced British duties on French wines and brandy. In consequence the value of British exports to France more than doubled in the 1860s and the importation of French wines into Britain also doubled. France ended the treaty in 1892 in favour of the Méline tariff.

According to a 2022 study, the treaty substantially increased trade between members of the treaty.

== See also ==
- France–United Kingdom relations
- Free trade agreements of the United Kingdom
