= Méline tariff =

The Méline tariff was a French protectionist measure introduced in 1892. It is noted as being the most important piece of economic legislation of the Third Republic and marked a return to earlier protectionist policies effectively ending the period of free trade associated with the 1860 Cobden–Chevalier Treaty. The tariff has in part been seen to be the result of efforts by industrialists to help combat a perceived external economic threat to the domestic market.

It has been suggested that politically the tariff was a reflection of an emerging confluence of interests among the industrial bourgeoisie, big landowners and peasant farmers. It is named after Jules Méline, the 65th Prime Minister of France.
