= Fires in the Paris Commune =

Fires at the Paris Commune

Coordinates: 48°51′27.71″N 2°20′51.78″E

Fires in Paris during the Commune
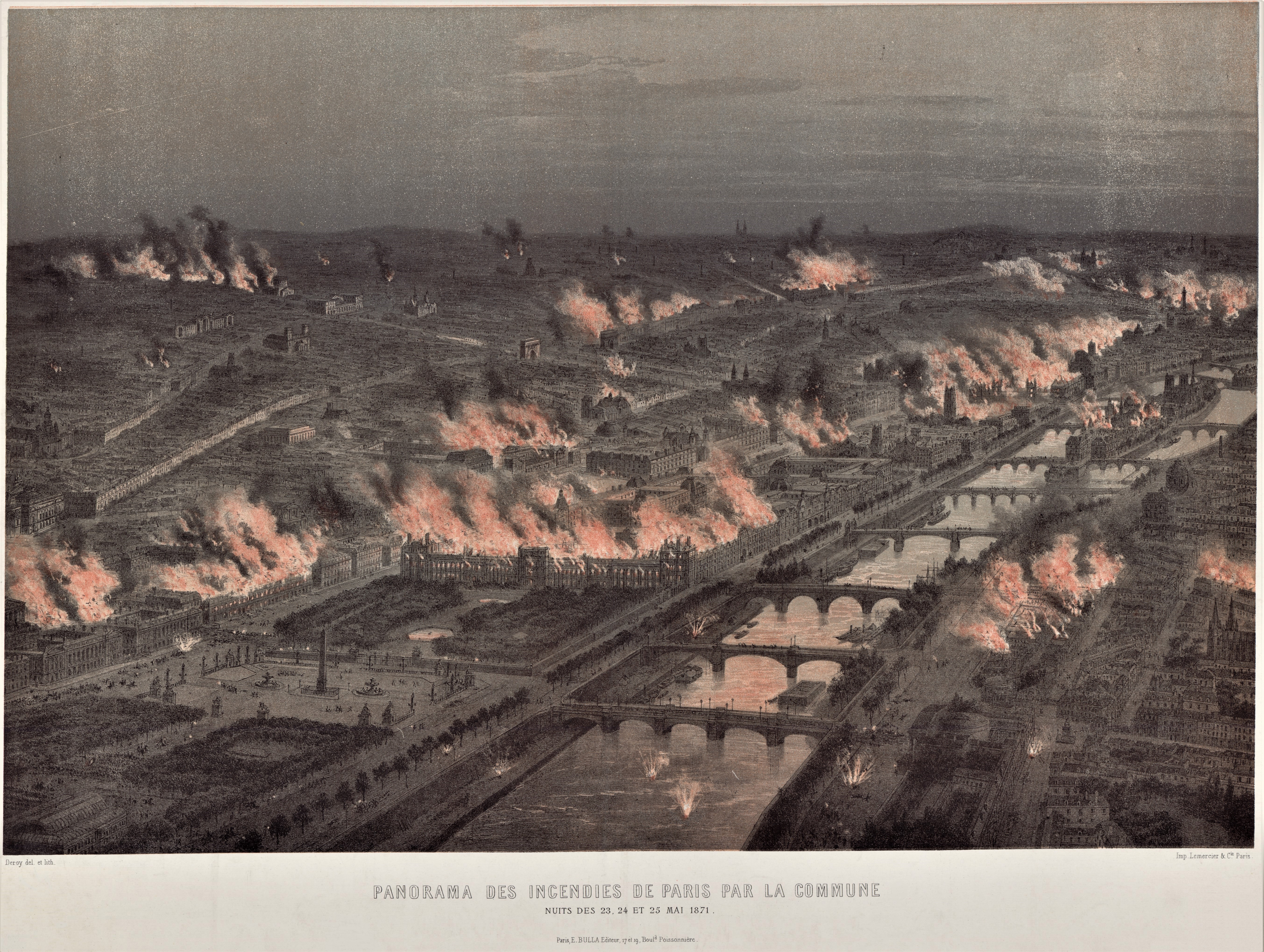
- Panorama of fires in Paris from 23 to 25 May - Lithograph by Auguste Victor Deroy, Musée Carnavalet, Paris.

The fires of Paris during the Paris Commune of 1871 refer to the widespread destruction of public monuments and private buildings in the city, particularly during "Bloody Week" (Semaine sanglante), which took place from 21 to 28 May 1871. This was the period when government forces from Versailles recaptured Paris from the Communards.

Most of the fires were set by members of the Commune, known as Communards or Federates, between 22 and 26 May. Notable buildings damaged or destroyed included the Tuileries Palace, the Palais-Royal, the Palais de Justice, and the Hôtel de Ville. Some landmarks, such as Notre-Dame de Paris, were spared. In addition to symbolic sites, private residences were also set ablaze, often as a defensive measure to hinder the advance of government troops.

The use of fire by the Communards has been interpreted in various ways: as a desperate military tactic, a symbolic act of political defiance, or a form of revolutionary expression. The decision to destroy these buildings was made in the final days of the Commune, when centralized control had largely broken down and many actions were taken on local initiative amidst the chaos of the Commune's collapse.

In the aftermath, the fires became a central element in the contested memory of the Commune. For supporters of the Versailles government, the destruction was cited as evidence of the Communards' alleged savagery, with particular emphasis placed on the role of women, leading to the emergence of the pétroleuses myth—female incendiaries accused of setting fires. The ruins of the destroyed buildings were not immediately rebuilt, and many became subjects of artistic and touristic interest. Numerous photographs captured the extent of the destruction. The loss of archives and official records in the fires also contributed to a significant erosion of historical documentation, leaving gaps in Paris's institutional memory.

== Paris under siege (September 1870-May 1871) ==
=== Prussian bombing and the barricade ===
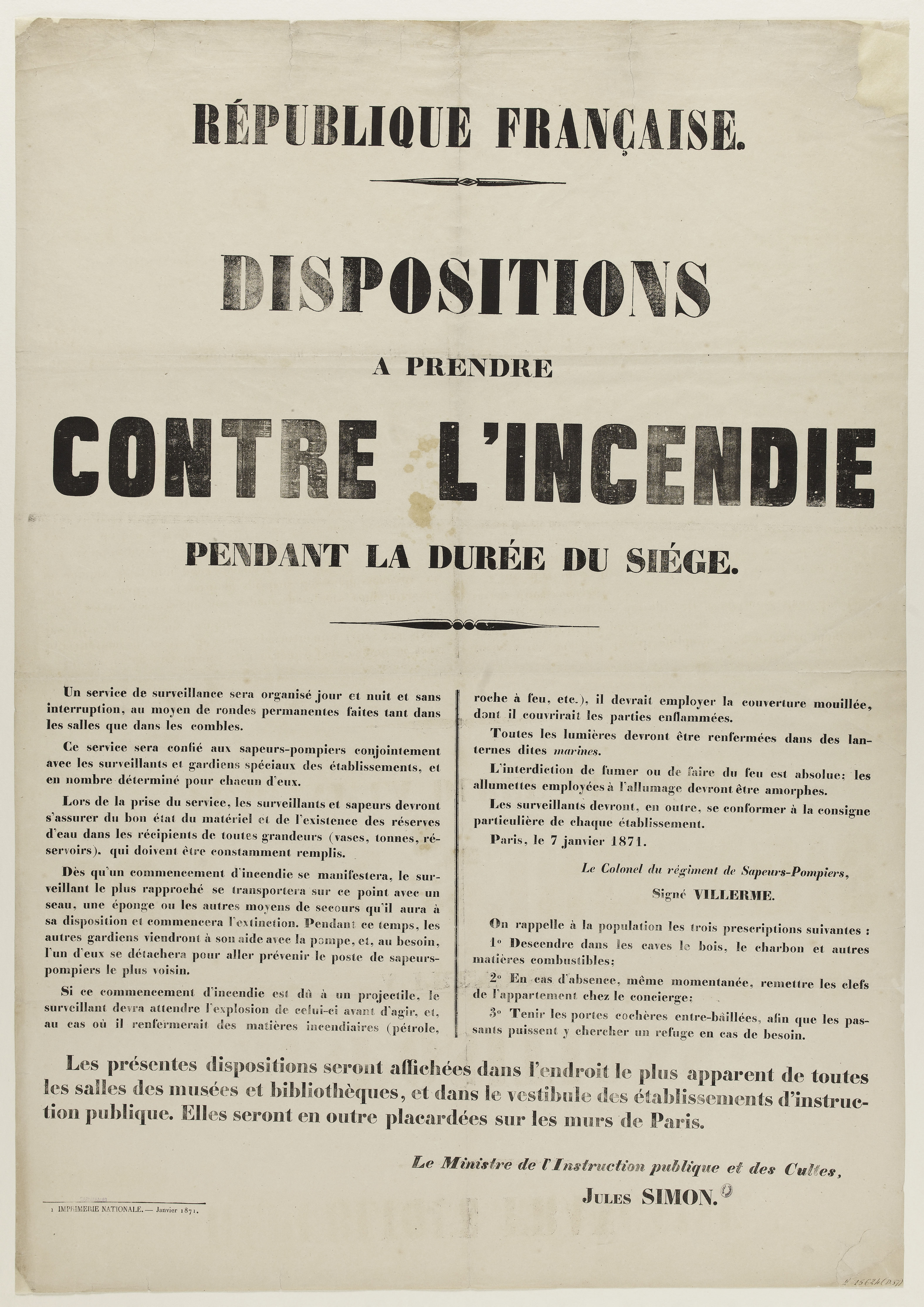
Official fire protection poster, January 1871. Musée Carnavalet.

France declared war on Prussia on 19 July 1870, initiating the Franco-Prussian War. Following the surrender of Napoleon III at the Battle of Sedan in early September, Parisians proclaimed the establishment of the Third Republic on 4 September 1870. However, hostilities continued, and from 20 September 1870, Paris came under siege by Prussian forces. During the siege, Prussian artillery regularly bombarded the city, particularly affecting the Left Bank, where numerous residential buildings were destroyed. The continuous cannonade instilled fear among the city's inhabitants. Fighting around Paris in the autumn and winter of 1870–1871 led to widespread destruction, with both French and Prussian forces responsible for the burning of buildings, bridges, farms, haystacks, and forested areas. In January 1871, a series of fires broke out in Paris as a result of the shelling, although these incidents were quickly contained.

The fear of Paris being destroyed by an invading force—an anxiety rooted in the legacy of the French Revolution, which served as a key ideological reference for the Paris Commune—was a recurring theme among 19th-century Parisian revolutionaries. This fear gradually transformed into a revolutionary resolve among some Communards to reshape and, if necessary, destroy the existing urban landscape. A central element of this approach was the barricade, which played both a defensive and symbolic role during the Commune. Beyond its military function, the barricade served to reconfigure public space, often constructed from everyday materials, including furniture and household items. This erasure of boundaries between private and public space marked the beginning of a broader revolutionary impulse to transform the city, ultimately culminating in the deliberate burning of parts of Paris during the final days of the Commune.

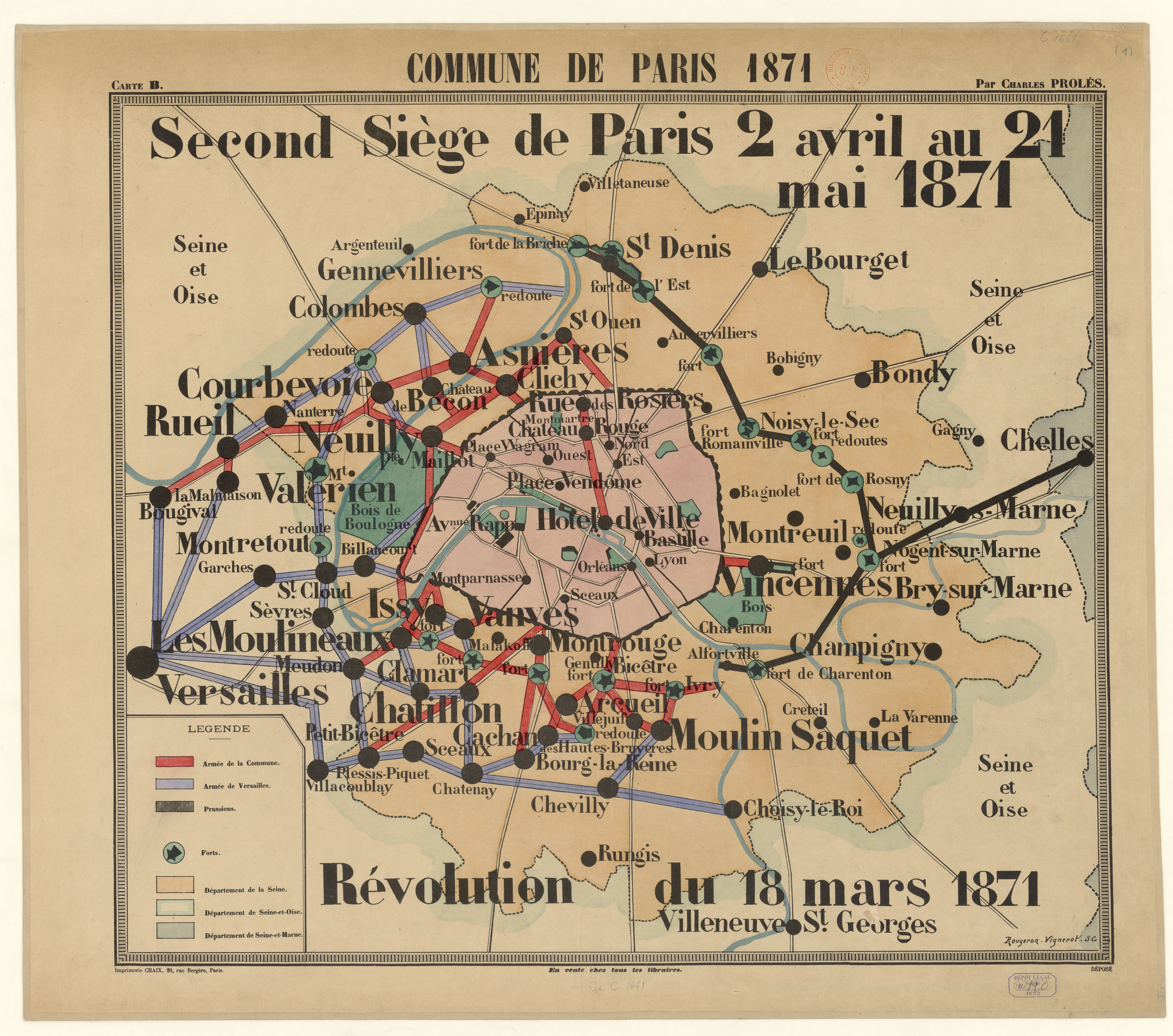
Second siege of Paris, 2 April to 21 May 1871. Map by Charles Prolès and Rougeron-Vignerot, 1892. BNF.

=== The siege of the Versailles army ===
Following the uprising of 18 March 1871, which marked the beginning of the Paris Commune, France entered a period of civil conflict. On one side was the national government, led by Adolphe Thiers and based in Versailles with the support of the National Assembly; on the other was the Commune, which exercised authority over Paris, despite unsuccessful efforts to inspire similar revolutionary movements in the provinces.

The second siege of Paris, this time led by government forces, lasted from 11 April to 21 May 1871. Thiers adopted a cautious, methodical strategy to surround and isolate the city. Paris, still fortified by the defensive walls originally commissioned by Thiers decades earlier, was treated as a military stronghold. The Versailles government proceeded carefully to avoid a military setback that might result in political instability, including the risk of army disintegration, uprisings in other major cities, or foreign—particularly Prussian—intervention.

The Versailles army subjected the Parisian suburbs and surrounding forts to sustained bombardment, surpassing even the intensity of the Prussian shelling during the earlier siege. The objective was to disable Paris’s outer defenses and breach its walls. This escalation in violence further galvanized the Communards, some of whom viewed the potential destruction of the city as preferable to surrender.

Fires broke out in several western and suburban areas, including Auteuil, Passy, Courbevoie, Asnières, Levallois-Perret, Clichy, Gennevilliers, and Montrouge. These were caused either by artillery strikes from the Versailles forces or deliberate actions by Communard fighters. Although incendiary plans reportedly existed for Bagneux and Vanves, the rapid advance of the Versailles army prevented their implementation. In total, relatively few fires were set in the western parts of Paris.

== The fires of Bloody Week ==
During Bloody Week, the chronology of destruction by fire is that of the recapture of Paris by Versailles troops, from west to east, from Sunday 21 May to Sunday 28 May 1871.

=== West, Monday, 22 May ===
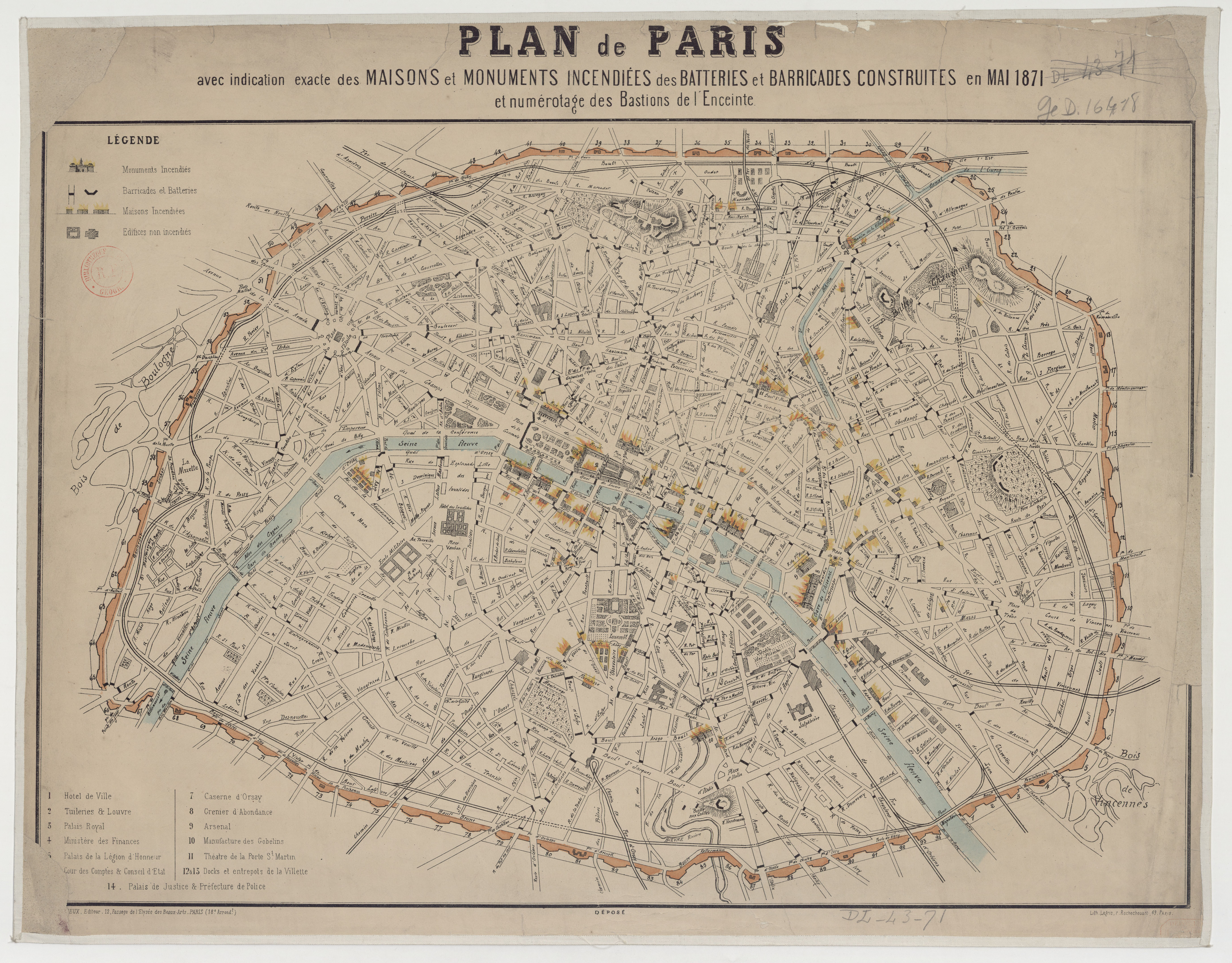
Map of Paris with exact indication of burnt houses and monuments. A. Carcireux, Paris, 1871.

Following an initial fire at the Champ de Mars barracks, a more significant blaze broke out on the evening of Monday, 22 May 1871, in the attic of the Ministry of Finance and later along rue de Rivoli, According to several accounts, the fire was initially triggered by shells fired by Versailles troops. It was subsequently extinguished by the Commune’s fire brigade.

The cause of the fire at the Ministry of Finance became a point of contention in the aftermath of the Paris Commune. As the first major fire during the final days of the conflict, it was viewed by both sides as a symbolic and strategic turning point. Each faction accused the other of initiating the act, which was seen as a precedent for the larger-scale fires that followed. Many exiled Communards attributed the fire to bombardment by Versailles artillery, a claim echoed by some Versailles sympathizers, including the writer Catulle Mendès. In contrast, anti-Communard author Maxime Du Camp alleged that there were two separate incidents at the Ministry: the first, on 22 May, caused by government shelling and extinguished by the Communards; and a second, on the following day, allegedly set intentionally by the Communards themselves.

=== The first major fires: Tuesday, 23 May ===
Until 23 May 1871, Versailles forces encountered relatively little resistance in their advance into Paris. However, the first major fires began that evening, coinciding with intensified defense efforts by the Communards. Following preparations completed around 6 p.m., several significant buildings were set ablaze during the night of 23–24 May, including the Palais de la Légion d'Honneur, the Palais d'Orsay (which housed the Cour des Comptes), the Caisse des Dépôts, the Tuileries Palace, and multiple nearby streets. Rue de Lille was among the most heavily affected. In response, the Versaillais temporarily halted their advance, opting to resume operations the following day to avoid the fires.

The Tuileries Palace served as the headquarters of the insurgent general Jules Bergeret, who commanded approximately 600 men. As Versailles troops approached, Bergeret, along with Alexis Dardelle, Étienne Boudin, and Victor Bénot, ordered the palace to be set on fire. Dardelle, appointed governor of the Tuileries by the Commune on 22 March 1871, oversaw the operation. On 23 May, flammable materials—including gunpowder, liquid tar, turpentine, and petroleum—were brought in and used to soak drapes, curtains, and wooden floors. Barrels of gunpowder were also placed in key locations, such as the Salon des Maréchaux and at the base of the Grand Staircase. Dardelle organized the evacuation of horses, harnesses, and valuable items, instructing staff to leave in anticipation of the imminent explosion. The fire was ignited using large flaming torches, and Dardelle and Bergeret later observed the blaze from the terrace of the Louvre. The Tuileries Palace continued to burn until Friday, 26 May.

The same evening, the Palais de la Légion d'Honneur was also set on fire. The act was attributed to Émile Eudes, reportedly following orders from the Comité de Salut Public. Another individual, Émile Gois, was named during a trial in 1872 as having issued the order, although definitive evidence is lacking. Elsewhere, fires in the Madeleine district and at the Croix-Rouge crossroads were used as defensive measures to slow the advance of Versailles troops. These areas were defended by Communard leaders Eugène Varlin and Maxime Lisbonne. (Note: Carrefour de la Croix-Rouge is now Place Michel-Debré)

=== Around the City Hall, Wednesday, 24 May ===
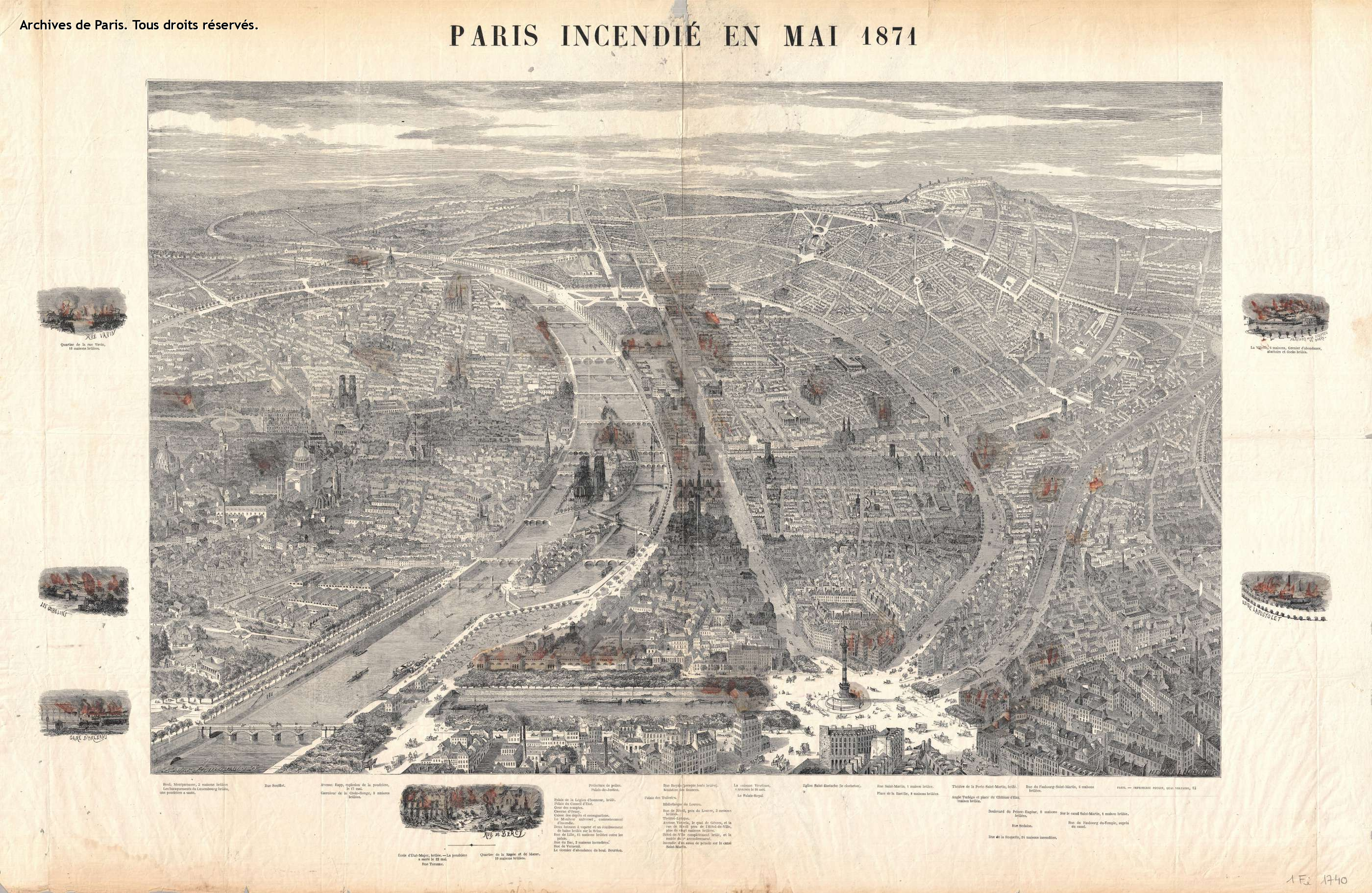
Paris set on fire in May 1871. Paris archive

On 24 May 1871, during the final days of the Paris Commune, widespread fires broke out across the city. Notable sites affected included the Louvre Palace—despite General Bergeret's later claims of opposition— as well as houses on rue Saint-Honoré, rue de Rivoli, and rue Royale, where seven people died of asphyxiation. The Palais-Royal (lightly damaged), the Hôtel de Ville (destroyed), the Palais de Justice, the Conciergerie, the Préfecture de police, the Théâtre de la Porte Saint-Martin (destroyed), and the Théâtre Lyrique were also targeted. Arsonists reportedly prepared the sites with pyres, barrels of gunpowder, and petrol. The fire at the Palais de Justice was partly caused by the collapse of a large water-filled calorifier used for heating, which ruptured and flooded the building. A report by Édouard Gerspach, chief of staff at the Ministry of Fine Arts, described the state of the Tuileries and the Louvre that same day.

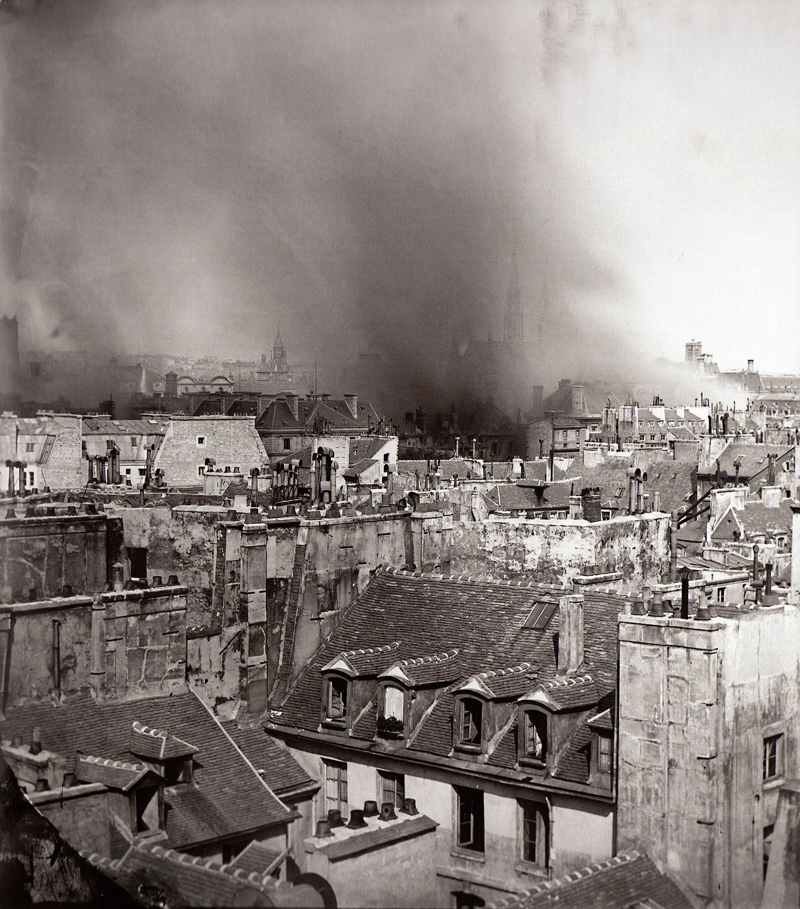
Fire at the Palais de Justice, photograph by Hippolyte Blancard, Bibliothèque historique de la ville de Paris.

The Hôtel de Ville was set on fire by order of Jean-Louis Pindy, its governor since 31 March. Théophile Ferré ordered the burning of the Préfecture de Police and the Palais de Justice around 10 a.m. Victor Bénot played a key role in the fire at the Palais-Royal and was reportedly responsible for setting fire to the Louvre library. A fire at Place du Château d'Eau that day hindered the Versailles advance. In the afternoon, Maxime Lisbonne detonated the powder magazine in the Luxembourg Garden.

Fires were also set on 23–24 May in houses near barricades, including on rue Saint-Florentin, rue du Faubourg Saint-Honoré, rue du Bac, rue Vavin, place de l'Hôtel-de-Ville, and boulevard de Sébastopol. Additional buildings destroyed or damaged included the Archives de la Seine, the artillery headquarters on Place de l’Arsenal, the Protestant temple on rue Saint-Antoine, and the barracks on Quai d'Orsay.

=== East of Paris, 25 and 26 May ===
On Thursday, 25 May 1871, the fire at the Hôtel de Ville was extinguished, while a new blaze began at the Greniers d’Abondance, a food storage facility located on Boulevard Bourdon.

On Friday, 26 May, fires broke out at the docks in La Villette, where large quantities of explosives were stored. Flames also surrounded the July Column in Place de la Bastille. The following day, 27 May, fires were reported in Belleville and at the Père-Lachaise Cemetery.

Several other sites in eastern Paris were also affected by fire. These included the capsulerie (percussion cap factory) on rue de l'Orme, the Théâtre des Délassements-Comiques, the Église Notre-Dame-de-la-Nativité de Bercy, and the 12th arrondissement town hall. Jean Fenouillas was executed in 1873 for his role in the latter two fires. Additional damage occurred at the Gobelins factory and in residential areas near barricades on rue de Bondy, boulevard Mazas, (Note: Boulevard Mazas is now boulevard Diderot.) boulevard Beaumarchais, and other streets.

Despite the scale of destruction, fires generally remained contained to their intended targets. The broad avenues created by Baron Haussmann’s urban renovations functioned effectively as firebreaks, limiting accidental spread.

=== Heat and light, smells and sounds ===
Throughout the Bloody Week, staff at the Paris Observatory in the Luxembourg Garden continued to record weather data, except on 24 May, when the site was on the front line. These records show that from 21 to 25 May 1871, temperatures at midday rose from 18 °C to 25 °C, with dry conditions and light to moderate winds—an unseasonably warm period.

Fires at Tuileries and Hôtel de ville

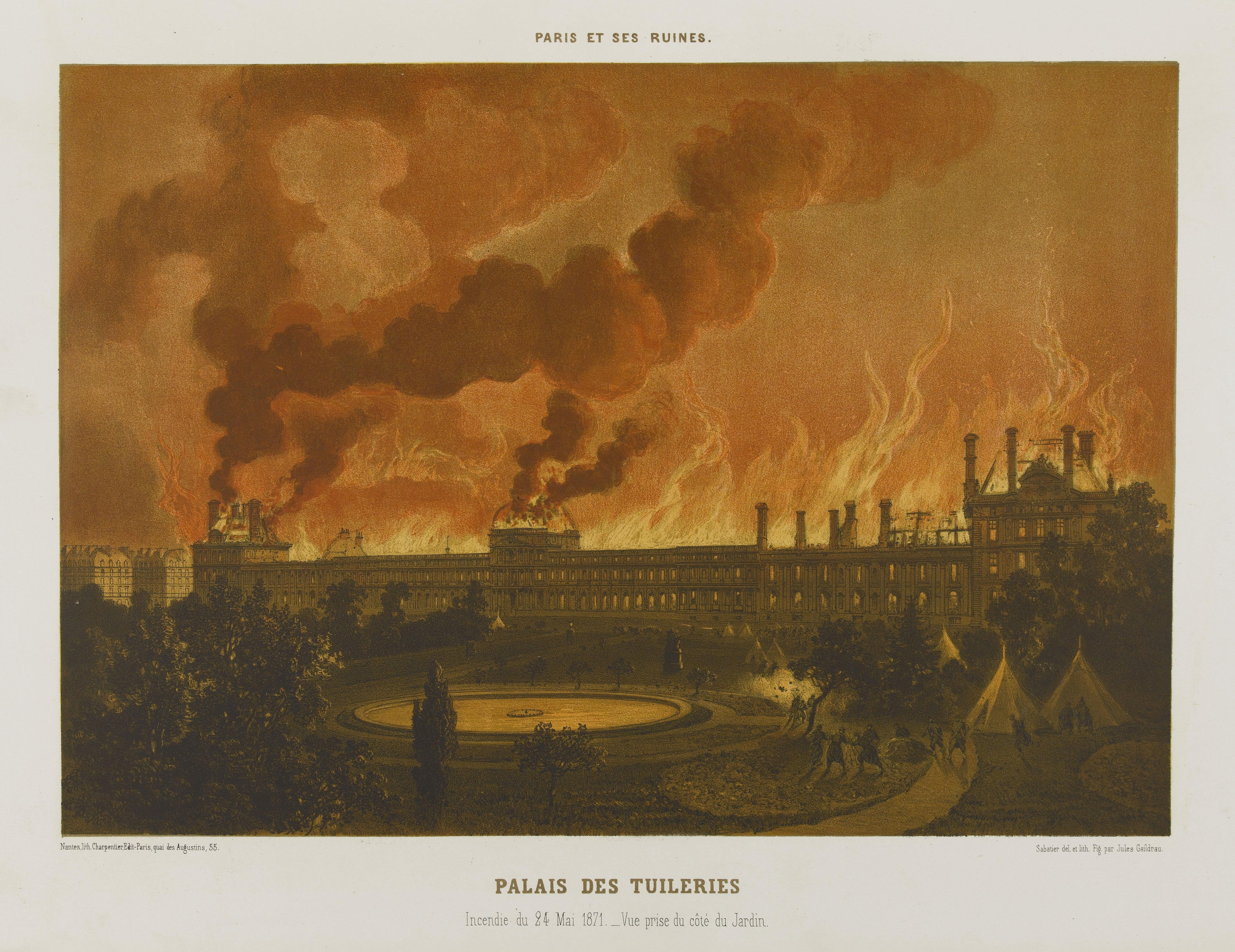
Incendie des Tuileries - Lithograph by Léon Sabatier and Albert Adam Paris et ses ruines, 1873 - Bibliothèque historique de la ville de Paris.

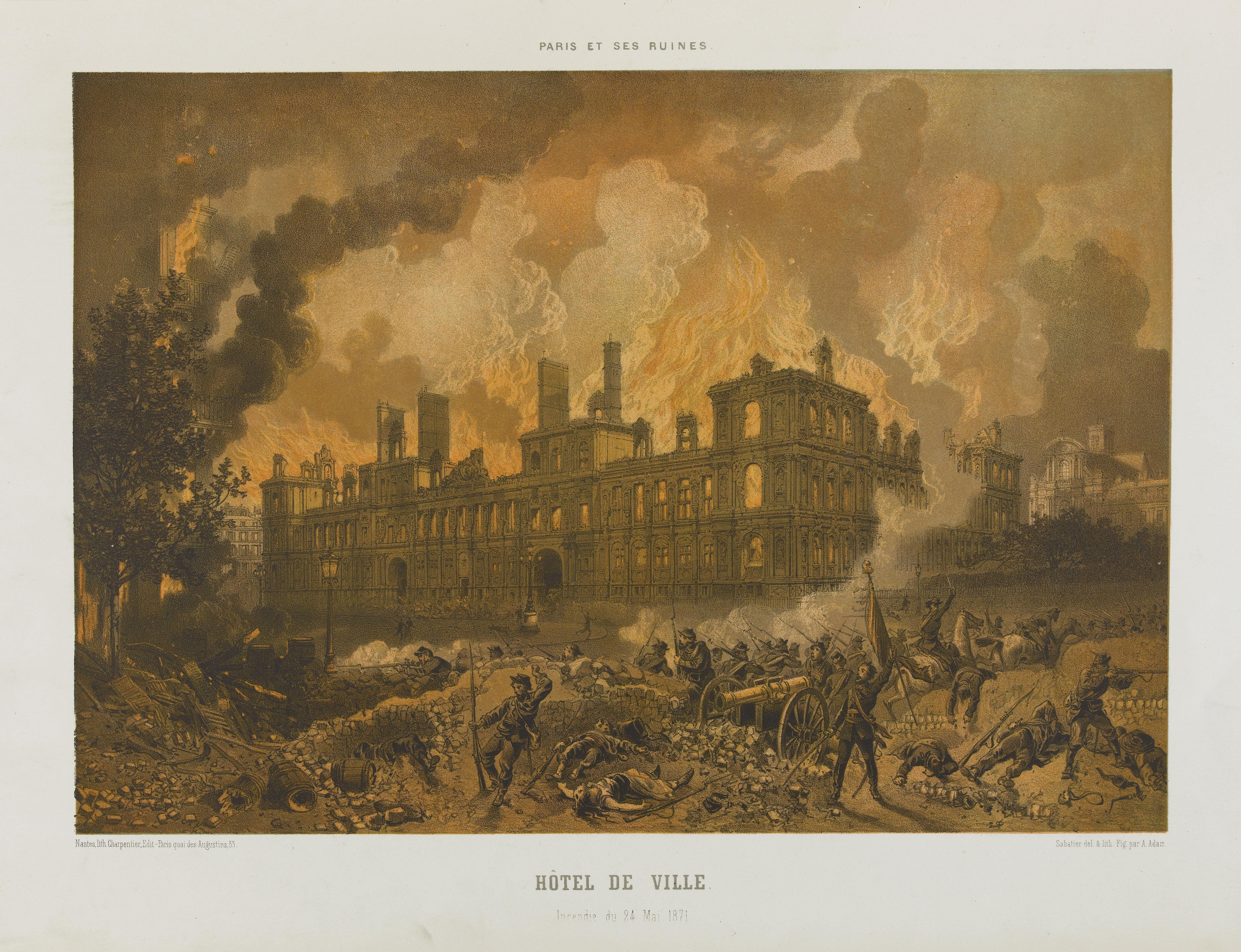
Hôtel de ville fire - Lithograph by Léon Sabatier and Albert Adam Paris et ses ruines, 1873 - Bibliothèque historique de la ville de Paris.

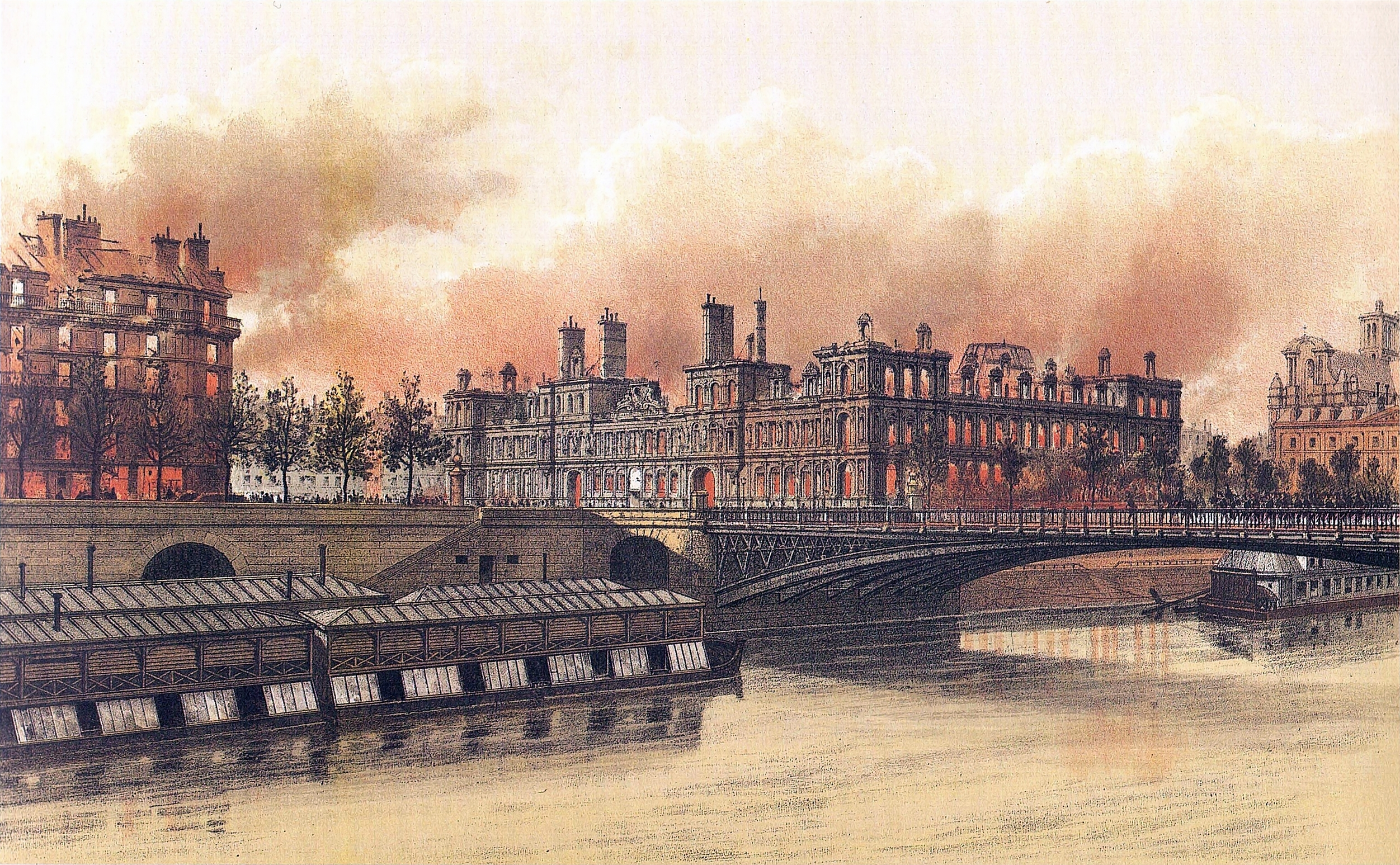
Theodor Josef Hubert Hoffbauer L'incendie de l'Hôtel de Ville de Paris. Paris through the ages, Firmin Didot, 1885.

Many Parisians climbed to rooftops or upper floors to observe the fires. The nighttime blazes created dramatic and unsettling scenes across the city. An anonymous resident of rue Saint-Denis described a sky illuminated red by fire, calling it an "infernal horizon." Contemporary observers, including a young American woman, expressed deep fear, with the fires considered among the most terrifying episodes of the Commune. In areas recaptured by Versailles forces, the destruction intensified resentment: some civilians assaulted captured Communards, blaming them for the fires, while others responded with stunned silence. As writer Ludovic Halévy remarked, “We can't find a word to say".

Weather conditions shifted on 26 May, with cooler temperatures (dropping to 17 °C), overcast skies, and rain. The showers soaked both fighters and terrain but helped control the fires. The wind turned westward, carrying smoke away from the front lines, which had moved eastward.

On 27 May, fog and steady rainfall further aided in extinguishing the flames. With Versailles forces close to victory, some interpreted the rain as a providential sign. By 28 May, the weather cleared, temperatures rose to 20 °C, and strong eastward winds fanned the last remaining fires as the Commune’s final resistance collapsed.

=== Monuments spared ===
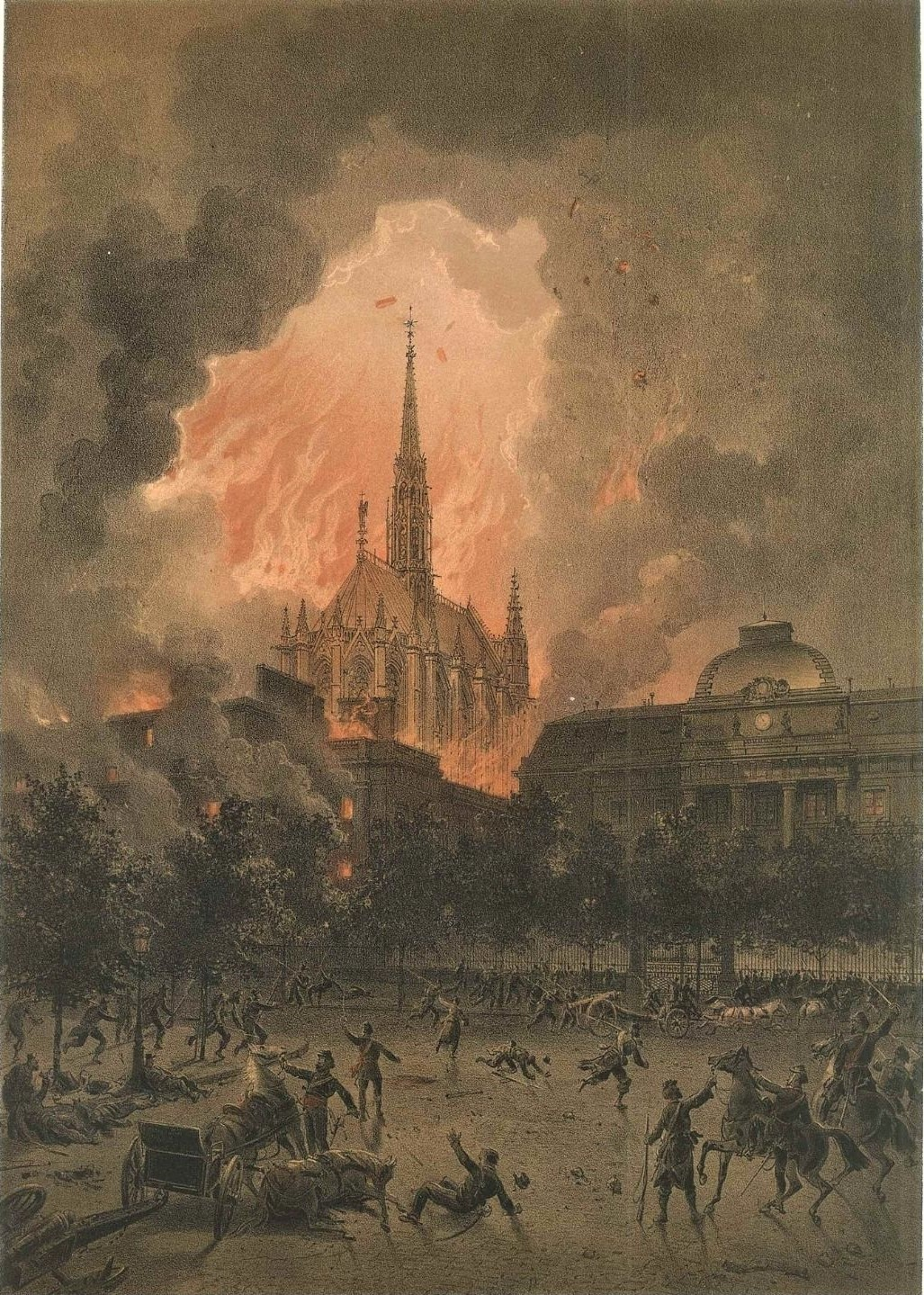
La Sainte Chapelle, miraculously preserved in the Palais de Justice fire, 24 May 1871. Lithograph by Sabatier and Adam, Paris et ses ruines, 1873.

Despite widespread fires during the final days of the Paris Commune, several prominent buildings escaped destruction. Adjacent to the burning Palais de Justice, the Sainte-Chapelle remained intact. A fire may have been briefly ignited inside Notre-Dame de Paris using chairs and benches, but it was quickly extinguished by local residents. According to Versailles sources, this was an aborted arson attempt; however, other accounts suggest the Communards deliberately refrained from targeting the cathedral, likely to avoid harming wounded federates sheltered in the nearby Hôtel-Dieu and because Notre-Dame was not among their primary political symbols. In general, churches were not targeted by arson, despite the Commune's strong anticlerical stance. The reasons for this restraint remain uncertain. The Hôtel-Dieu hospital, though within reach, was not set on fire—reportedly because the evacuation of the sick occurred too late, by which time the area had been retaken by Versailles forces.

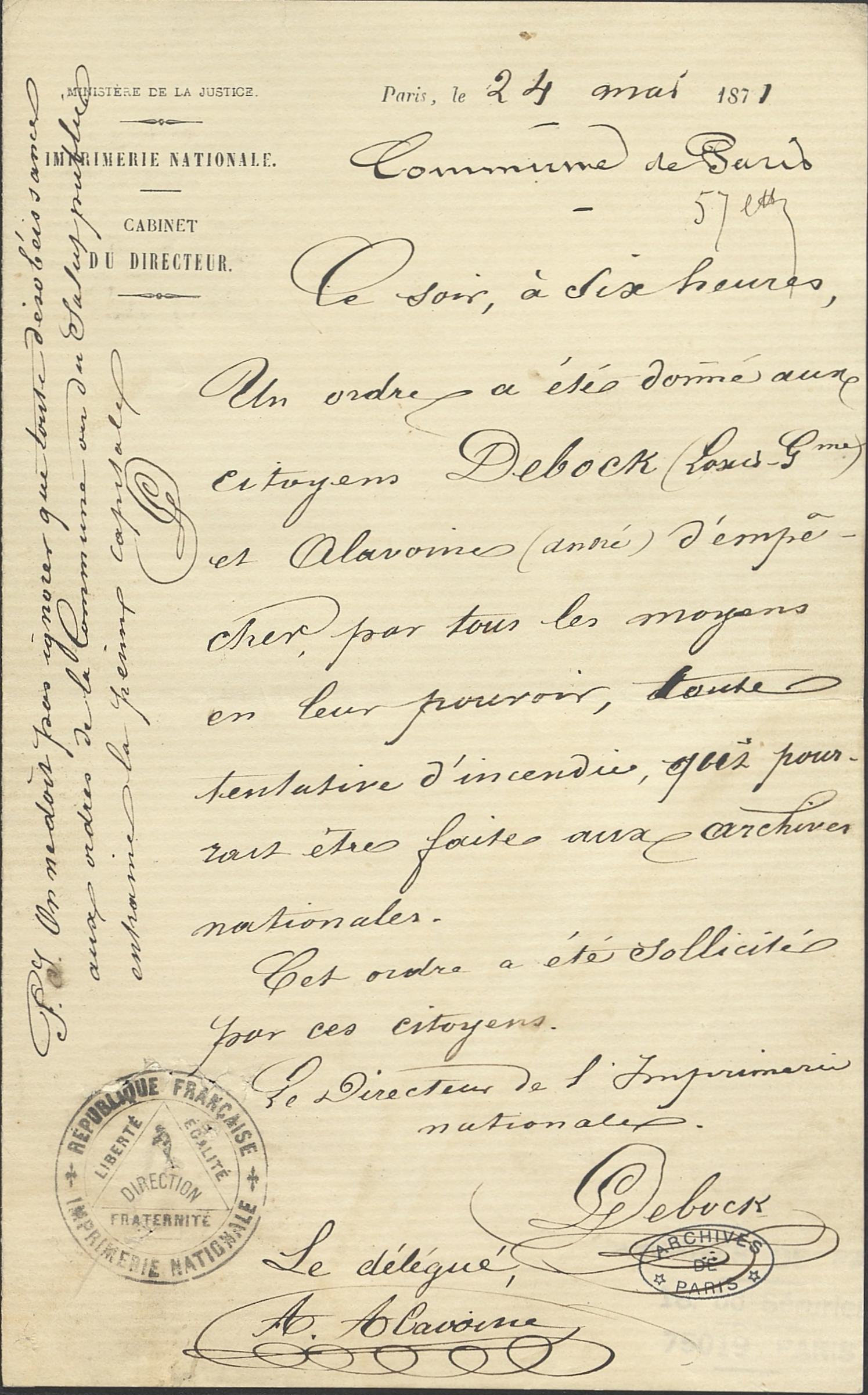
Order given to citizens Debock and Alavoine to prevent by all means any attempt to set fire to the Archives Nationales. Archives de Paris.

The Bank of France was also spared, largely due to the intervention of Charles Beslay, the Commune’s commissioner. and the deputy governor, the Marquis de Ploeuc. Beslay later explained that he had acted to prevent violence from the Commune’s radical factions and claimed credit for preserving France’s financial stability.

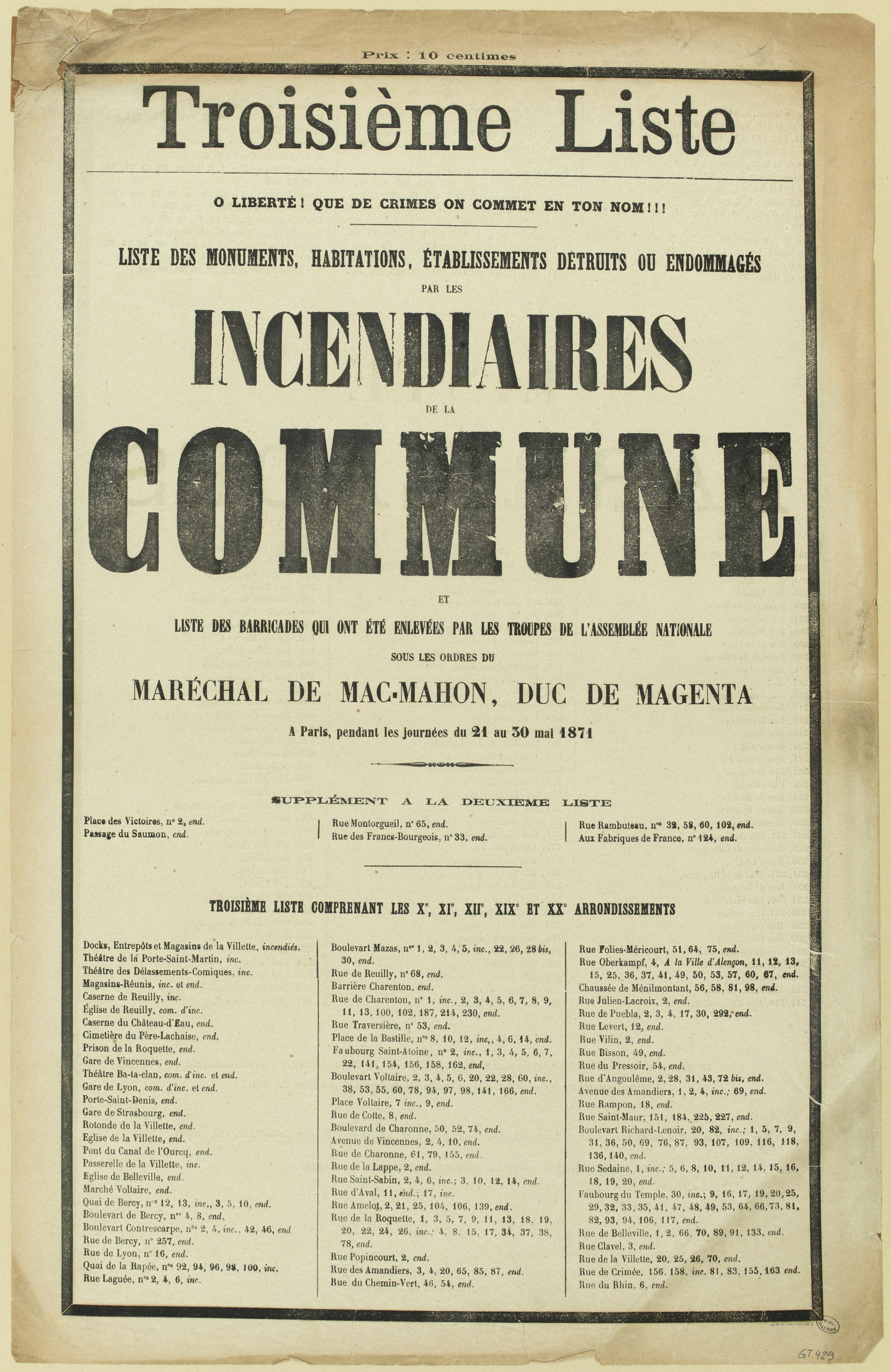
Third list of monuments, dwellings and establishments destroyed or damaged by the incendiaries of the Commune. Poster, 1871, 54.5 x 35.2 cm. Musée Carnavalet, Paris.

Other cultural institutions were also protected. The Archives Nationales, the Bibliothèque Mazarine, and the Bibliothèque du Luxembourg were saved by the efforts of both their administrators and moderate Communards. Louis Ferdinand Alfred Maury, director of the Archives, and Louis-Guillaume Debock, delegate at the Imprimerie Nationale, successfully opposed arson plans. Debock, stationed at the printing works next to the Archives, reportedly prevented their destruction by threatening an arsonist commander with a revolver on 24 May.

According to historian Jean-Claude Caron, between 216 and 238 buildings were destroyed or damaged by fire, though much of Paris remained untouched. The symbolic weight of the buildings that burned—such as the Hôtel de Ville—amplified the perceived scale of destruction. The last fires were extinguished on 2 June. Apart from the seven known victims of asphyxiation, reports of fire-related deaths are often regarded as unreliable due to their anti-Communard bias. Most houses were set alight after residents had been evacuated. Based on post-Commune compensation claims, historian Hélène Lewandowski estimated that at least 581 buildings were damaged, including 186 residences and 32 public buildings.

== The Commune and the fire ==
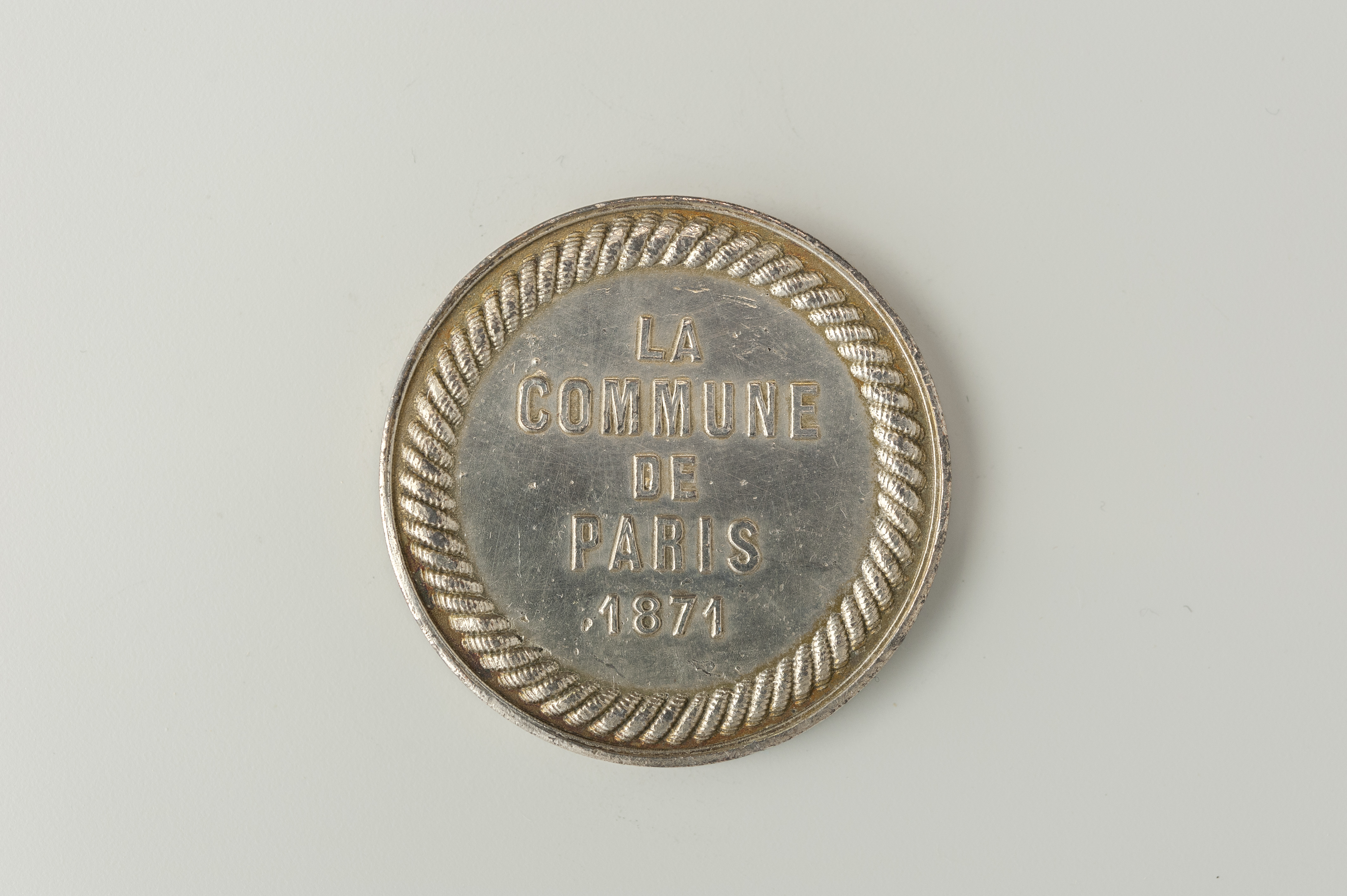
Right side of medal: La Commune de Paris 1871;

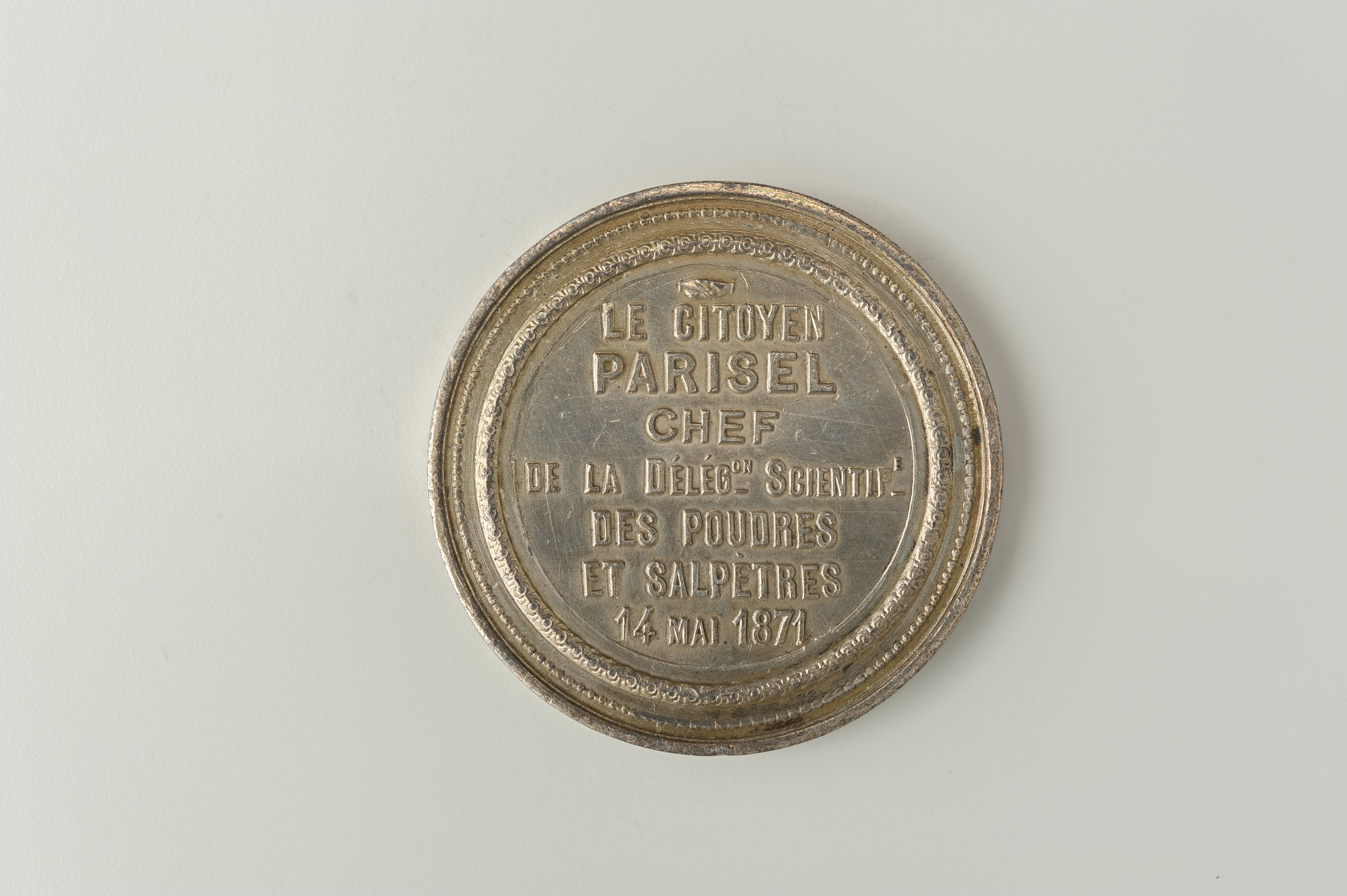
reverse side of medal: Le citoyen Parisel chef de la délégation scientifique des poudres et salpêtres 14 May 1871

On 22 April 1871, the Paris Commune established a Scientific Delegation headed by pharmacist François-Louis Parisel. The delegation was tasked with overseeing food safety, aerostatics, poisons, and new methods of destruction. Parisel called for the invention of chemical weapons and incendiary devices, though most proposals submitted were impractical. Records show he purchased small quantities of materials for experiments but did not accumulate large stores of flammable substances, On 16 May, he was instructed to organize "Fuseen artillerymen"; by 18 May, twenty-seven had been officially formed.

As fighting intensified in late May, the Comité de salut public ordered the collection of all chemical and incendiary materials, to be concentrated in the 11th arrondissement. On 24 May, it created brigades of fuséens—400 men commanded by Jean-Baptiste Millière, Louis-Simon Dereure, Alfred-Édouard Billioray, and Pierre Vésinier—with a mission to ignite "suspicious houses and public monuments." These organizational efforts came too late to have major effect. Nonetheless, the Commune had stored petrol, gunpowder, and incendiary projectiles in parts of eastern Paris, later recovered by Versailles forces.

The Commune's use of fire in urban warfare reflected a mix of improvisation and fragmented planning. Orders to burn buildings were typically issued in active combat zones, but many fires were set spontaneously by small groups of fighters. As the Commune's command structure disintegrated, local initiative and disorganization prevailed. Isolated federate units, often outnumbered and surrounded, resorted to lighting fires in the heat of combat, sometimes using kerosene.

Anti-Communard sources circulated rumors of widespread arson: incendiary eggs, booby-trapped sewers, houses marked for destruction, and firebombs launched by balloon. These stories, though unsubstantiated, framed the Communards’ actions as criminal and illegitimate. The Versailles press described alleged petroleum-equipped arson units, particularly in connection with the Palais-Royal fire. However, most of the 117 individuals arrested for fire-related acts after the Commune were released, and many appear to have refused orders to assist in arson, with some attempting to extinguish fires amid the fighting.

This atmosphere of suspicion persisted after the Commune’s fall. Writing on 31 May, Émile Zola described a lingering climate of fear in Paris, with widespread paranoia about continued arson and mistrust among citizens, dubbing it the "Terror of Fire.

=== Communards and responsibility for fires ===
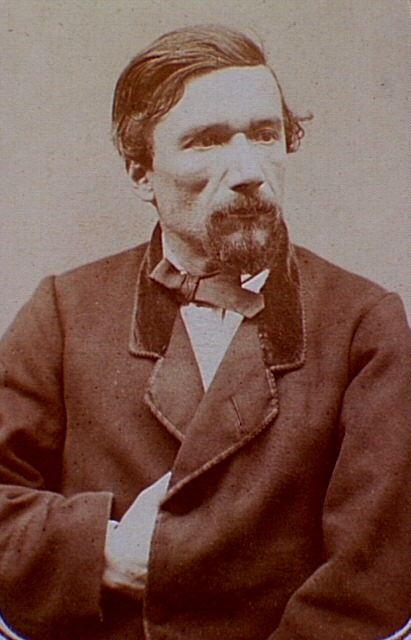
Victor Bénot, sentenced for the Tuileries fire and the Rue de Lille fire.

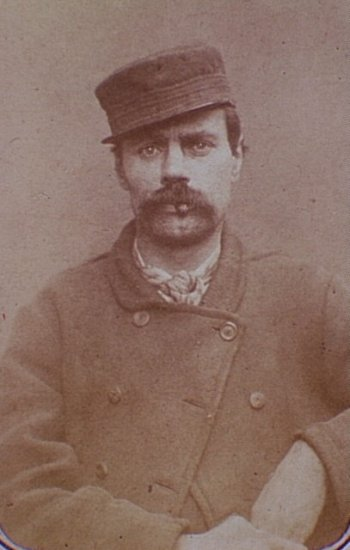
Louis Decamps, sentenced for the Tuileries fire and the Rue de Lille fire.

Following the suppression of the Paris Commune, the Versailles army launched a widespread crackdown on suspected arsonists, banning the oil trade and actively searching for individuals accused of setting fires. Judicial records indicate that 175 people were formally accused of arson. Among approximately 40,000 Communards tried by military courts, only 41 were prosecuted specifically for arson. Of these, 16 received death sentences (five were carried out; the rest were commuted), and 24 were sentenced to hard labor. Notable convictions included Baudoin for the fire at Saint-Eloi church, Victor Bénot for the Tuileries Palace fire, and Louis Decamps for a fire on rue de Lille. Including convictions in absentia, roughly 100 individuals were sentenced, although the actual number of arsonists was likely higher, as they were more difficult to apprehend than armed combatants.

Initially, arsonists were categorized as common criminals and excluded from Henri Brisson's first amnesty proposal in 1871. However, the general amnesty granted in 1880 made no such distinctions.

Responsibility for the fires remained a contested issue. Some, like Pierre Vésinier, denied Communard involvement, attributing the destruction solely to Versailles shelling—a claim with limited support. Others, such as Arthur Arnould, Gustave Lefrançais, and Jean Allemane, suggested that agents of the former Second Empire were responsible, possibly seeking to destroy incriminating documents. Lefrançais acknowledged Communard responsibility only for the fires at the Tuileries and the Greniers d’Abondance, which he defended, but condemned the destruction of the Hôtel de Ville.

Accounts also attribute some fires to personal motives, including vendettas and financial incentives. Jules Andrieu reported that former employees set fires in shops, while Louise Michel claimed some property owners committed arson to conceal bankruptcy or collect compensation. Several Communards, including Eugène Vermersch, Victorine Brocher, Prosper-Olivier Lissagaray, and Gustave Paul Cluseret, defended the use of fire as a legitimate revolutionary act.

=== Tactical choice, strategy of despair, and apocalyptic sovereignty party ===
From the end of the Bloody Week, attributing responsibility for the fires became a significant political issue. While a few fires—such as those at the Ministry of Finance and in Belleville—were almost certainly caused by Versailles artillery, the majority were attributed to the Communards.

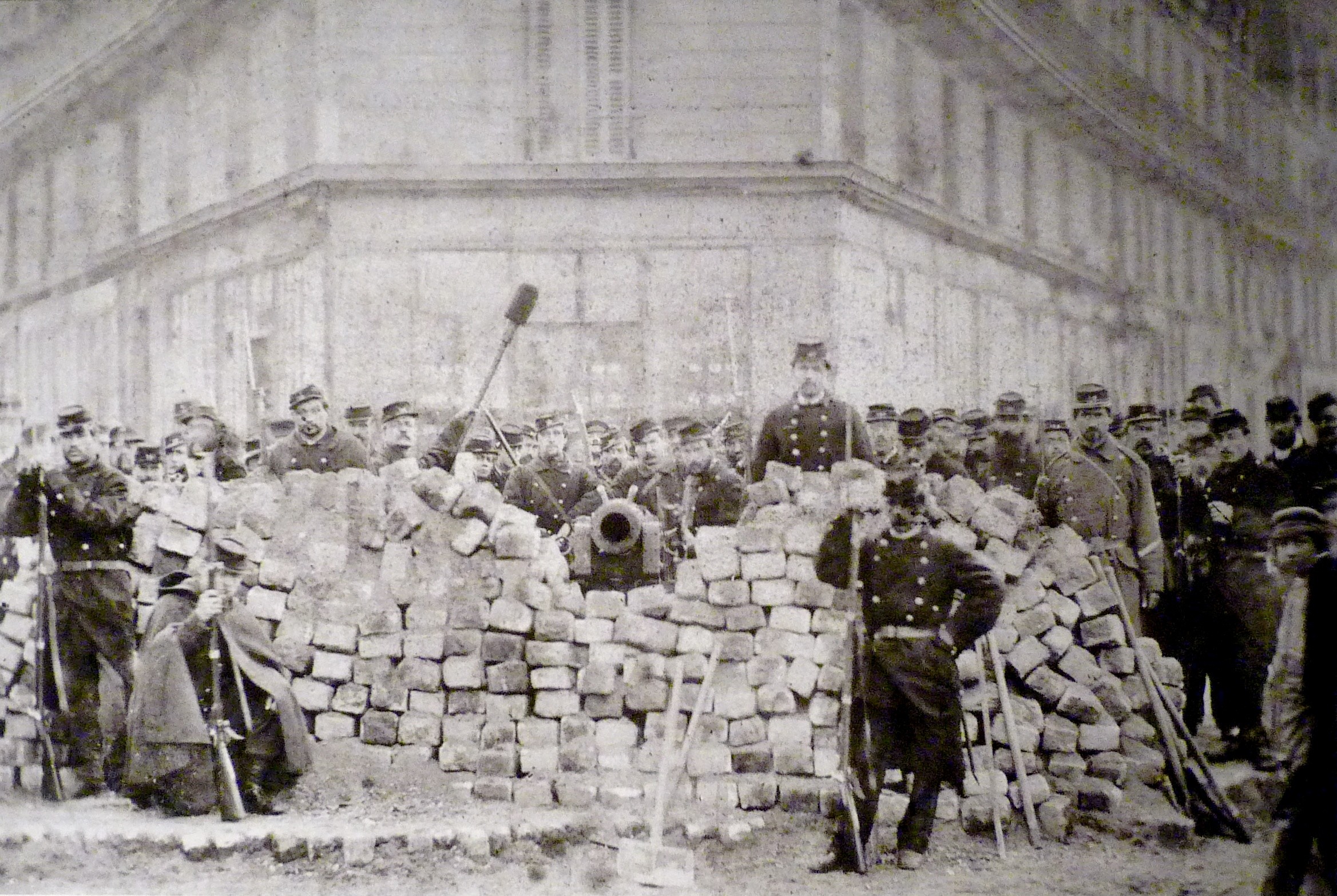
At the corner of boulevards Voltaire and Richard-Lenoir, a barricade defends the 11th arrondissement town hall, where the Commune retreated on 25 May. Photo by Bruno Braquehais, Bibliothèque historique de la ville de Paris.

Though fires had occurred in earlier revolutions, such as those of July 1830 and February 1848, they remained limited due to the swift success of those uprisings. In contrast, the Commune fought a prolonged, defensive urban war. Fire was used tactically, particularly to hinder Versailles forces who advanced by breaching walls along streets—a method known as cheminement. In response, Communards set fire to buildings supporting barricades, creating barriers of flame to protect their retreat. For instance, the Théâtre de la Porte Saint-Martin was burned on 24 May to enable a withdrawal toward the Bastille.

However, strategic necessity does not fully explain the use of fire. Some Communards viewed it as a desperate final act. A slogan attributed to Louis Charles Delescluze: "Moscow rather than Sedan ", encapsulated this mindset. Louise Michel had similarly declared: “Paris will be ours or Paris will no longer exist!". Versailles military authorities, such as General Appert, believed the fires were a last-minute decision taken when defeat was imminent.

On a symbolic level, the destruction targeted monuments associated with state power, centralized authority, and the institutions of monarchy, the Church, and the army. These acts were interpreted as revolutionary iconoclasm, paralleling the earlier destruction of the Vendôme Column and Adolphe Thiers' residence. The burning of the Hôtel de Ville, headquarters of the Commune, was seen by some as a refusal to let the symbol of their political project fall into enemy hands. Others, like Jules Andrieu, dismissed its significance, viewing it as a place of past betrayals.

The fire at the Tuileries Palace, a powerful emblem of imperial rule, was especially symbolic. It followed a festive concert held there on 20 May and was witnessed by cheering crowds on 24 May. Communard Gustave Lefrançais later admitted to feeling joy at its destruction. For some, the flames served not only as instruments of war but as celebratory illuminations.

Overall, the fires set by the Communards served three main purposes: as a tactical response in chaotic combat, as an assertion of symbolic ownership of the city, and as a form of vengeance. As Jules Andrieu summarized, the fires were "an order given by no one, accepted by everyone".

== Images, imagination, and memory of fires ==
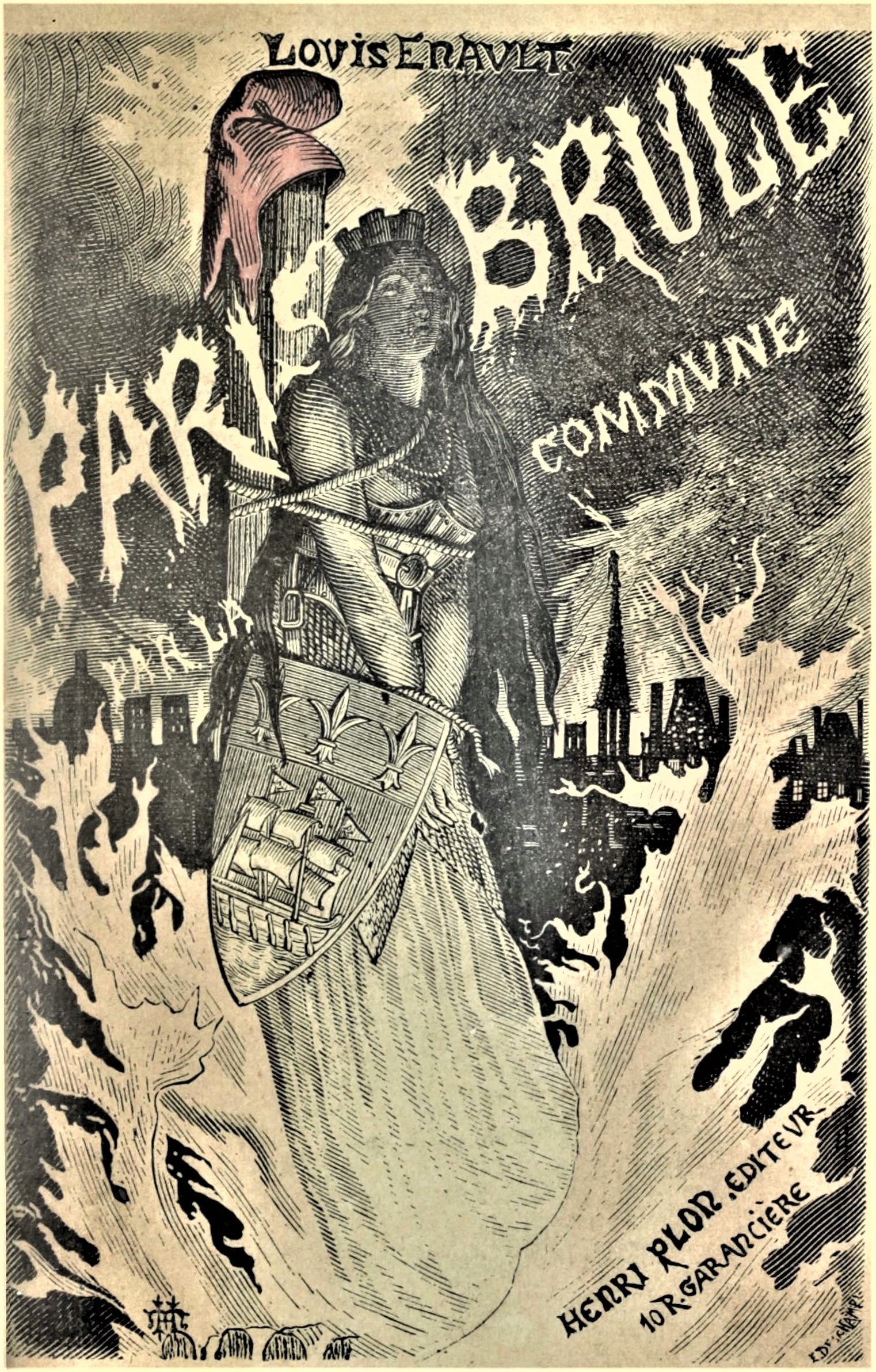
Illustration by L. Breton for the cover of Louis Énault's Paris brûlé par la Commune, Paris, Henri Plon, 1871.

=== Wild madness, divine punishment, and flames in the night ===
After the fall of the Paris Commune in 1871, the fires that marked the final days of the conflict became a central theme in the counter-revolutionary narrative. Versaillais commentators depicted the destruction as the work of a barbaric and foreign force, often drawing on imagery of chaos and excess, including references to the Fire of Moscow (1812), Nero, and figures such as the Huns and Tamerlane. Fire was portrayed as the weapon of "negro revenge," a symbol of madness and moral decay. In this interpretation, the Communard became a figure of insanity and aesthetic destruction—a barbarian and enemy of civilization. Paul de Saint-Victor wrote: “In the afterglow of the Paris fire, the world saw how similar tyranny and demagogy are. Nero, through the centuries, passed his torch to Babeuf.” This association of revolutionary violence with historical tyranny persisted into the 1890s, echoed in the works of Edmond de Goncourt, Alphonse Daudet, Émile Zola, and others.

While many fires were likely set as defensive measures during combat, Versaillais narratives emphasized them as deliberate acts of symbolic destruction—a final, defiant gesture of sovereignty by the Commune. In response, some Catholic and conservative voices invoked religious language and visions of divine punishment. Louis Veuillot, for example, compared the burning of Paris to biblical catastrophes, describing it as a punishment surpassing even that of Sodom and Gomorrah.

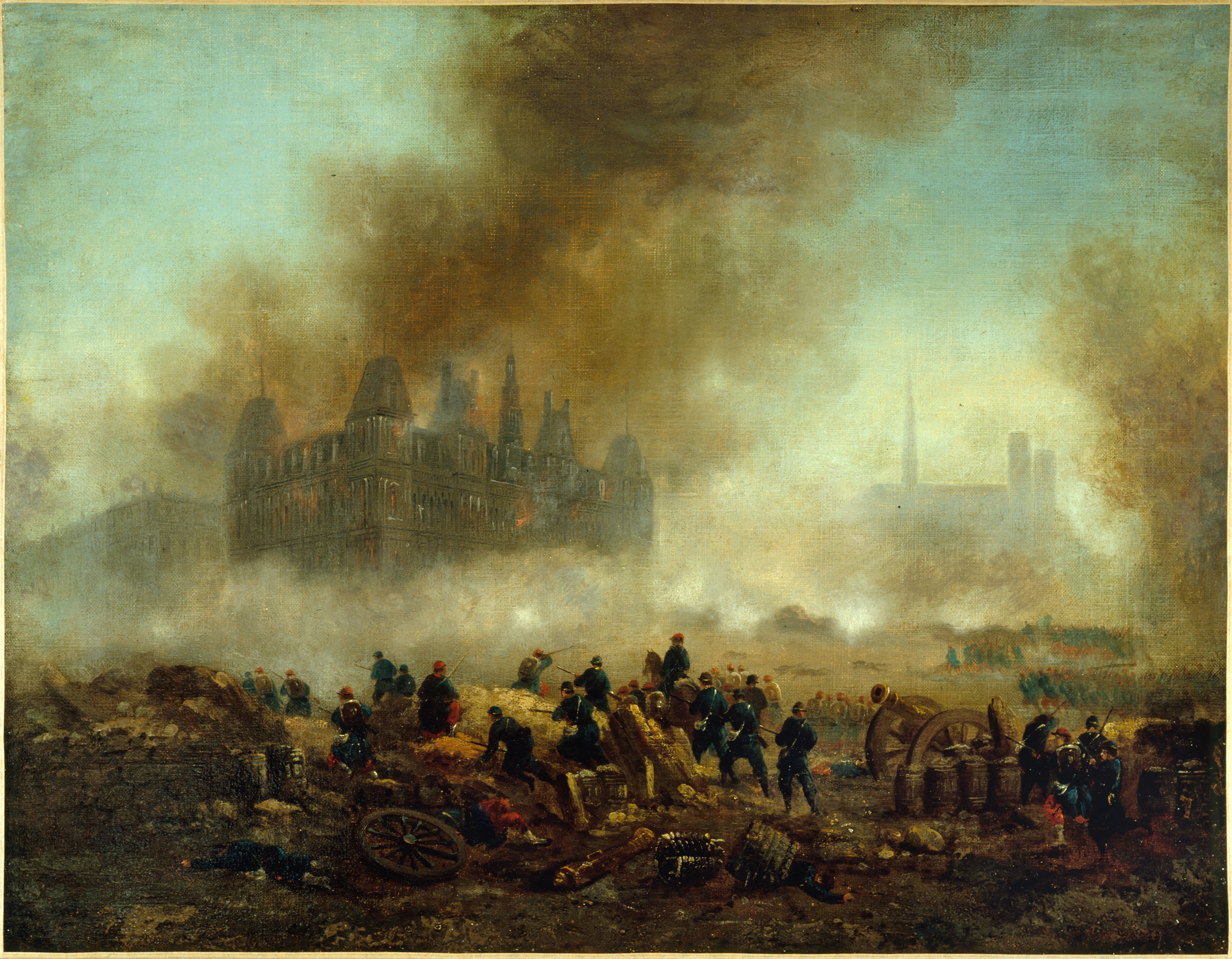
Gustave Boulanger, L'Hôtel de Ville incendié, attaqué par les troupes versaillaises. 65.8 cm × 80.5 cm, 1871. Musée Carnavalet, Paris.

In Versaillais writings, comparisons between the Paris Commune and the biblical Apocalypse were frequent. These metaphors served both to convey the horror the Commune inspired and to suggest the possibility of Paris’s eventual renewal.

A recurring theme was the alleged misuse of oil by the Communards, described in terms such as "flotsam and jetsam of oil." As a substance drawn from deep within the earth, oil was symbolically linked to hell. For Catholic commentators in particular, its use was interpreted as a sign of the dangerous union between technological progress and revolutionary ideology, reinforcing conservative critiques. This narrative was echoed in widespread fears of subterranean mines supposedly planted by the Communards, contributing to rumors that further inflamed the hostility of Versaillais forces. Both the oil and mine myths fed anxieties among soldiers and civilians, legitimizing repressive violence in the aftermath of the Commune.

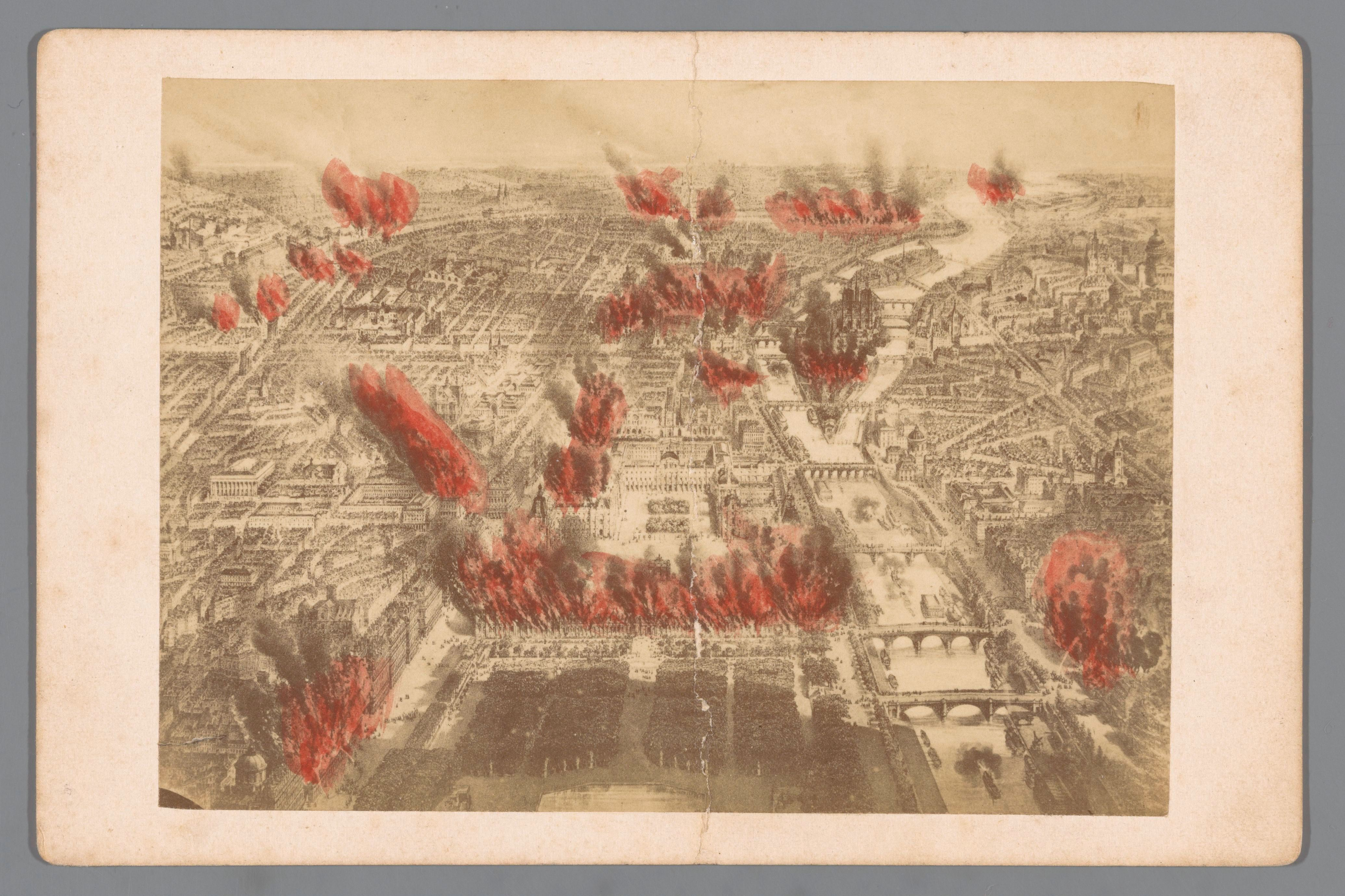
Émile Haering, known as Numa fils, Paris on fire. Photographed and retouched engraving, circa 1871.Rijksmuseum Amsterdam.

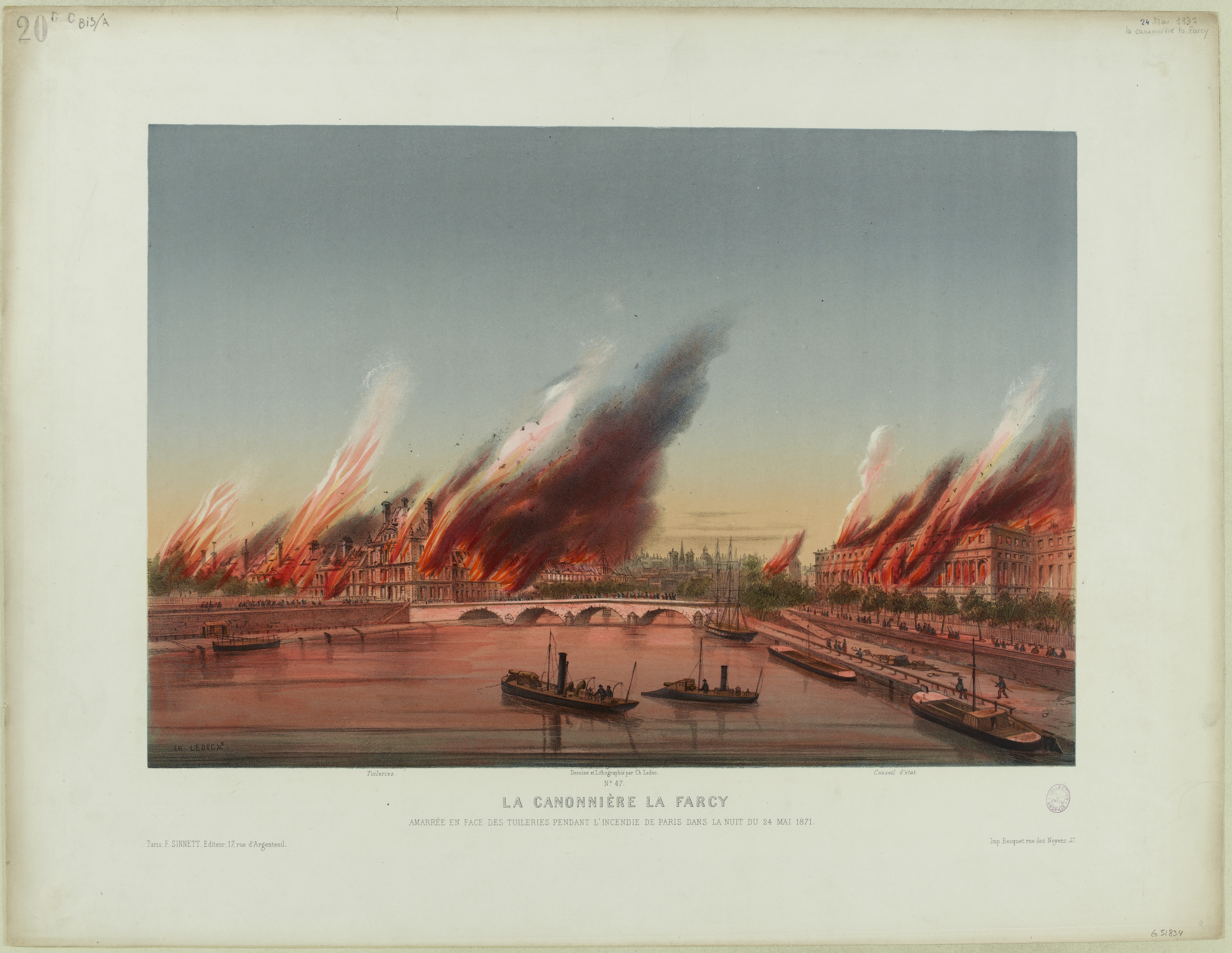
Charles Leduc. The gunboat La Farcy moored opposite the Tuileries during the burning of Paris on the night of 24 May 1871. Polychrome lithograph, circa 1871. Musée Carnavalet, Paris.

Artists working in the immediate aftermath of Bloody Week—such as Jules Girardet, Georges Clairin, Édouard Manet, Alfred Darjou, Gustave Courbet, Gustave Boulanger, and Alfred Philippe Roll—sought to document the events using a naturalist approach.

Panoramic depictions, like Numa fils’s Paris incendié or Charles Leduc’s La Canonnière La Farcy, portrayed the Seine illuminated by flames, with Paris often likened to a volcanic eruption. The fires were most often depicted at night, with darkness serving as a metaphor for the perceived moral darkness of the Communards. Even pro-Communard voices, such as Pierre Vésinier, described the inferno in vivid, almost sublime terms:

Émile Zola also returned to these scenes in La Débâcle (1892), emphasizing the surreal brightness of a city seemingly ablaze without end.

Writers and visual artists shared a strikingly similar lexicon, marked by bright, saturated imagery. This emphasis on color and spectacle played a central role in shaping the visual and literary memory of the Commune.

Throughout the 20th century, school textbooks often focused on the fires of Bloody Week as emblematic of the Commune’s violence, attributing full responsibility to the Communards. Until the 1960s, this imagery—barricades, flames, and ruins—dominated representations of the event, later giving way to greater attention on executions and repression.

=== The Pétroleuses myth ===
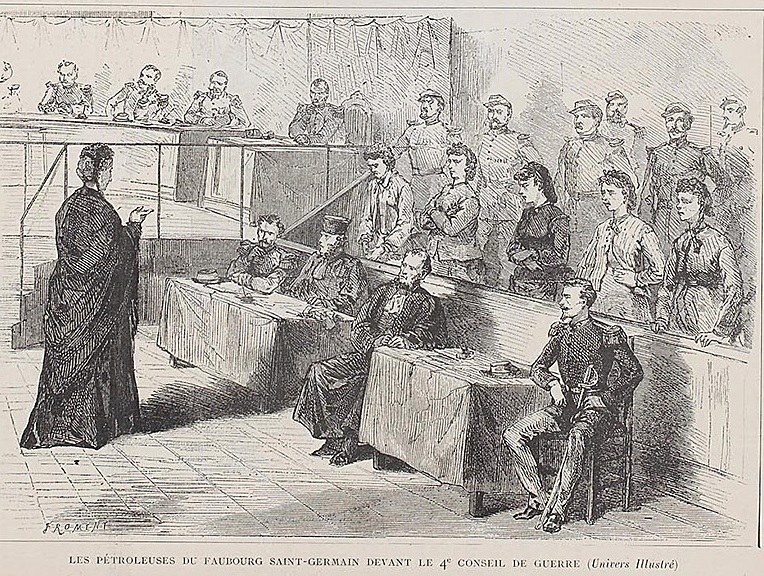
Les pétroleuses of faubourg Saint-Germain at the 4e Conseil de guerre, engraving by Gustave Froment after a drawing by Maître Guérin, L'Univers illustré, 16 September 1871.

From the moment of their victory in 1871, Versaillais authorities and commentators began constructing the myth of the pétroleuses—female arsonists allegedly responsible for setting fires during the final days of the Paris Commune. This narrative was based on a limited number of cases involving women near sites of fire and was later critically examined by historian Édith Thomas in her 1963 study Les Pétroleuses, The term itself, coined in the aftermath of the Commune, was described by Théophile Gautier as a necessary neologism to reflect "unknown horrors". However, contemporary records do not support the widespread presence of female arsonists. Most women arrested were involved in support roles, such as canteen workers, ambulance drivers, or nurses, with only a minority accused of direct involvement in arson.

A notable example occurred on 4 September 1871, when five women were tried for allegedly setting fire to the Palais de la Légion d'Honneur. Three were sentenced to death—later commuted—despite minimal evidence. Descriptions of the accused were often dehumanizing and gendered, reflecting broader societal anxieties about female violence.

Communard figures such as Louise Michel denied the existence of pétroleuses, and Karl Marx attributed the fires to male combatants. Nonetheless, the image of the female incendiary gained traction. Communard women were portrayed as more dangerous than their male counterparts, with their actions attributed to emotional excess rather than political conviction.

The myth of the pétroleuse drew on earlier tropes of female violence, echoing revolutionary figures such as the tricoteuses of 1793. It served to delegitimize female participation in the Commune by casting it as a transgression of traditional gender roles. Women were either depicted as nurturing cantinières or as deranged arsonists. In popular media—songs, newspapers, prints—pétroleuses appeared as grotesque figures, often shown in rags, carrying petroleum-filled milk cans, and forming menacing groups.

Pétroleuses images

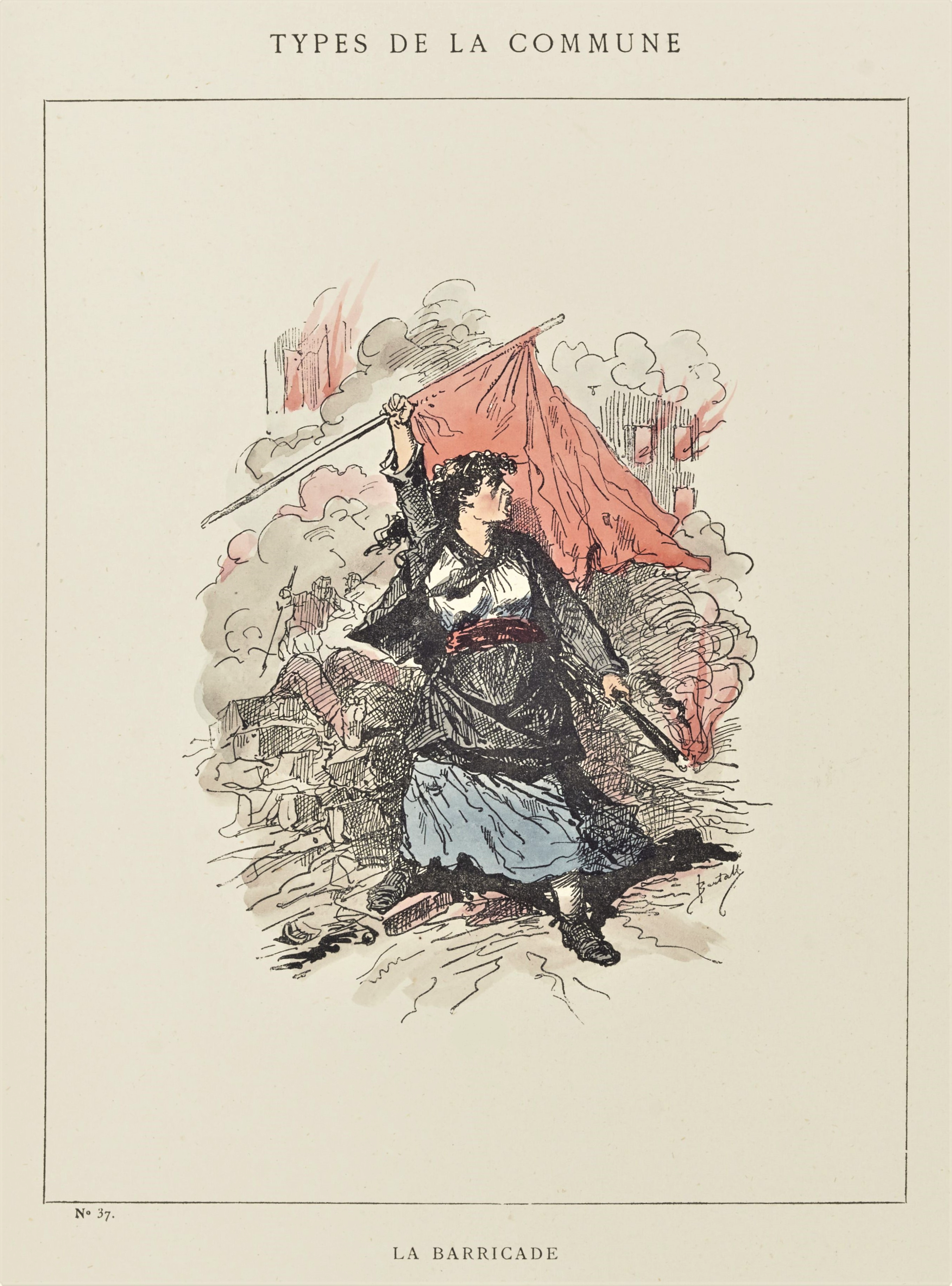
Bertall, Les Communeux, 1871: Types, caractères, costumes, Paris, Plon, 1880. 49. The barricade. Bibliothèque nationale de France

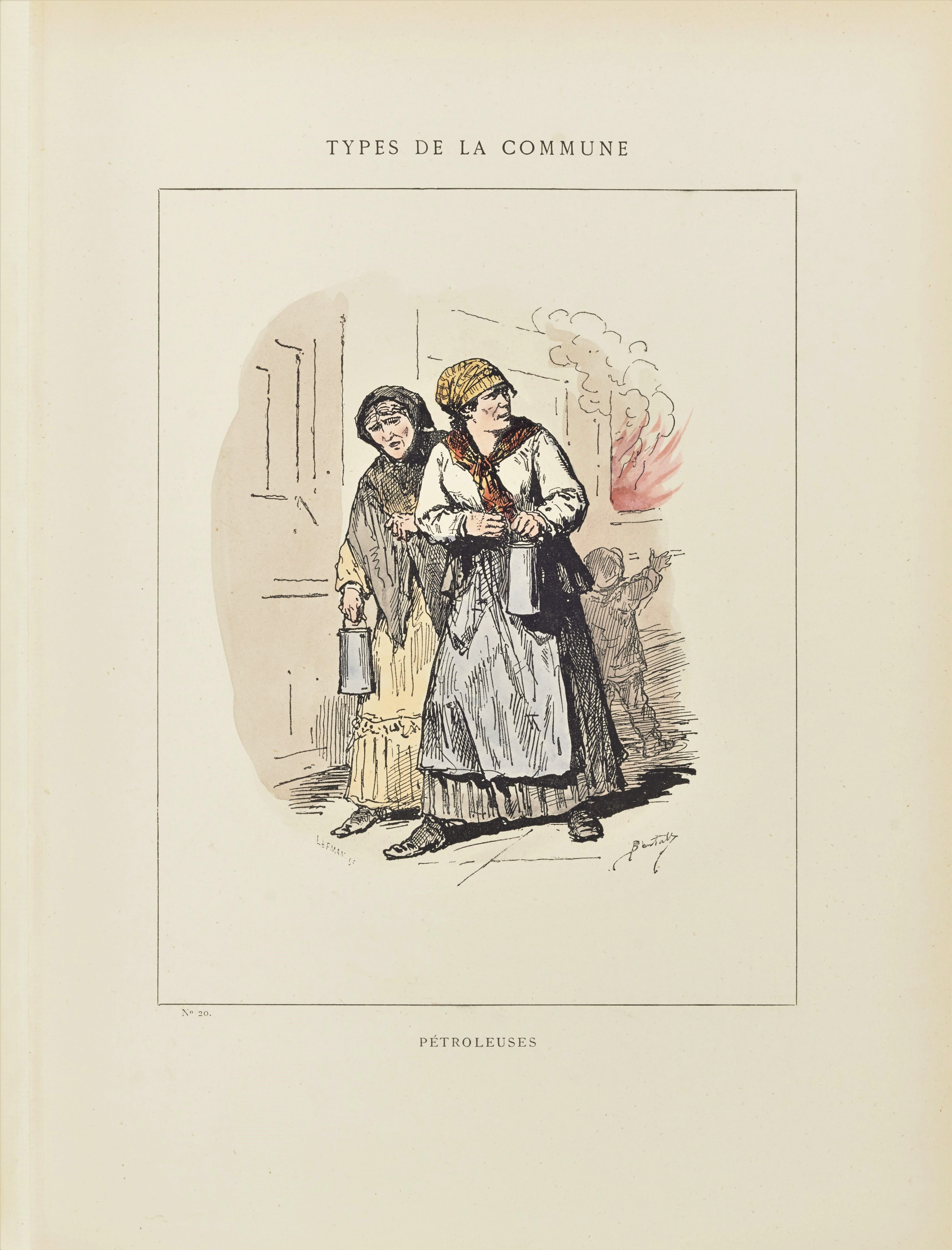
Bertall, Les Communeux, 1871: Types, caractères, costumes, Paris, Plon, 1880. 32. Pétroleuses. Bibliothèque nationale de France.

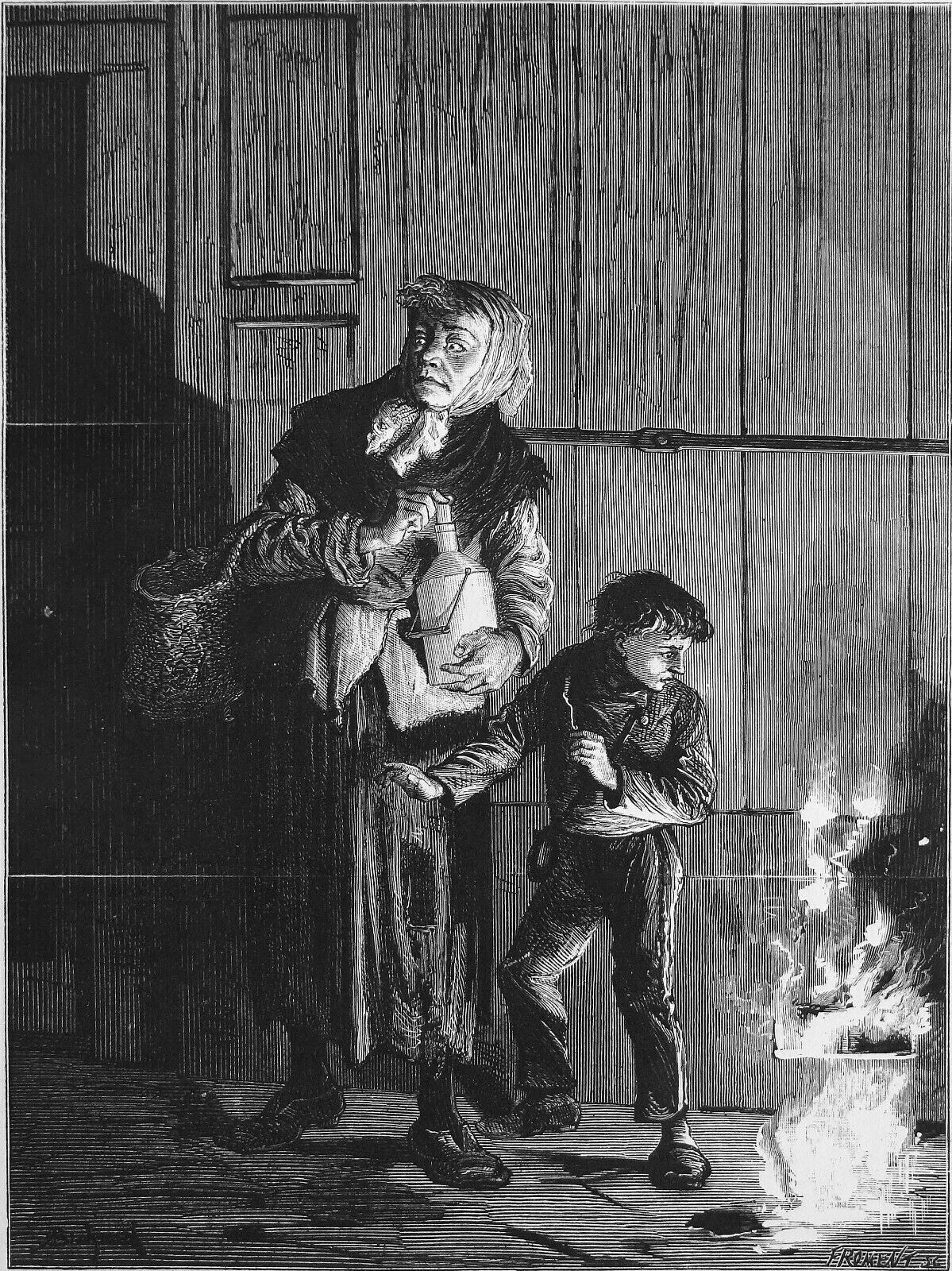
Une pétroleuse. Lithograph by Adrien Marie, engraved by Froment, Musée Carnavalet, Paris, 1871.

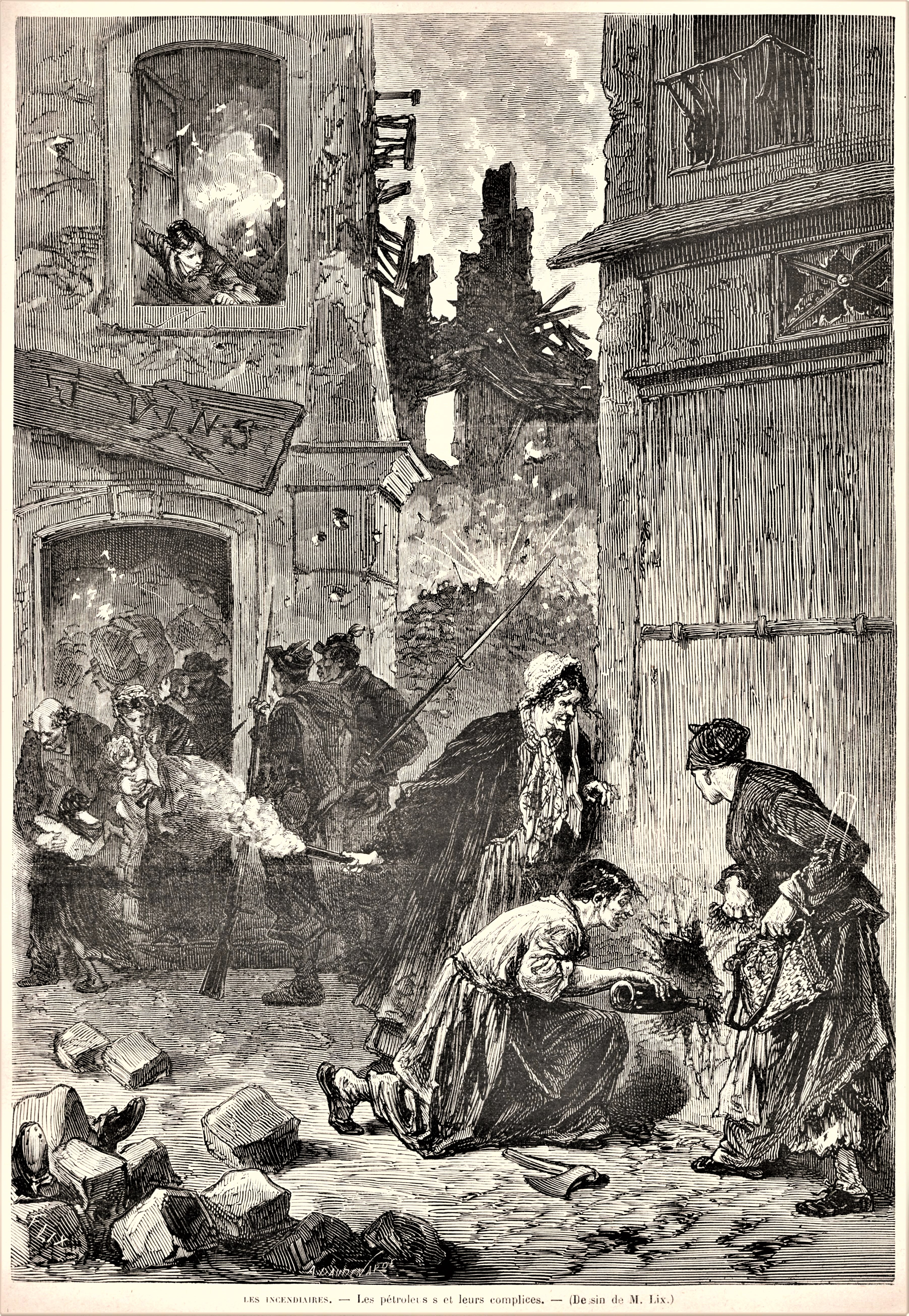
Les pétroleuses et leurs complices, drawing by Frédéric Lix in Le Monde illustré, 3 June 1871. Bibliothèque nationale de France.

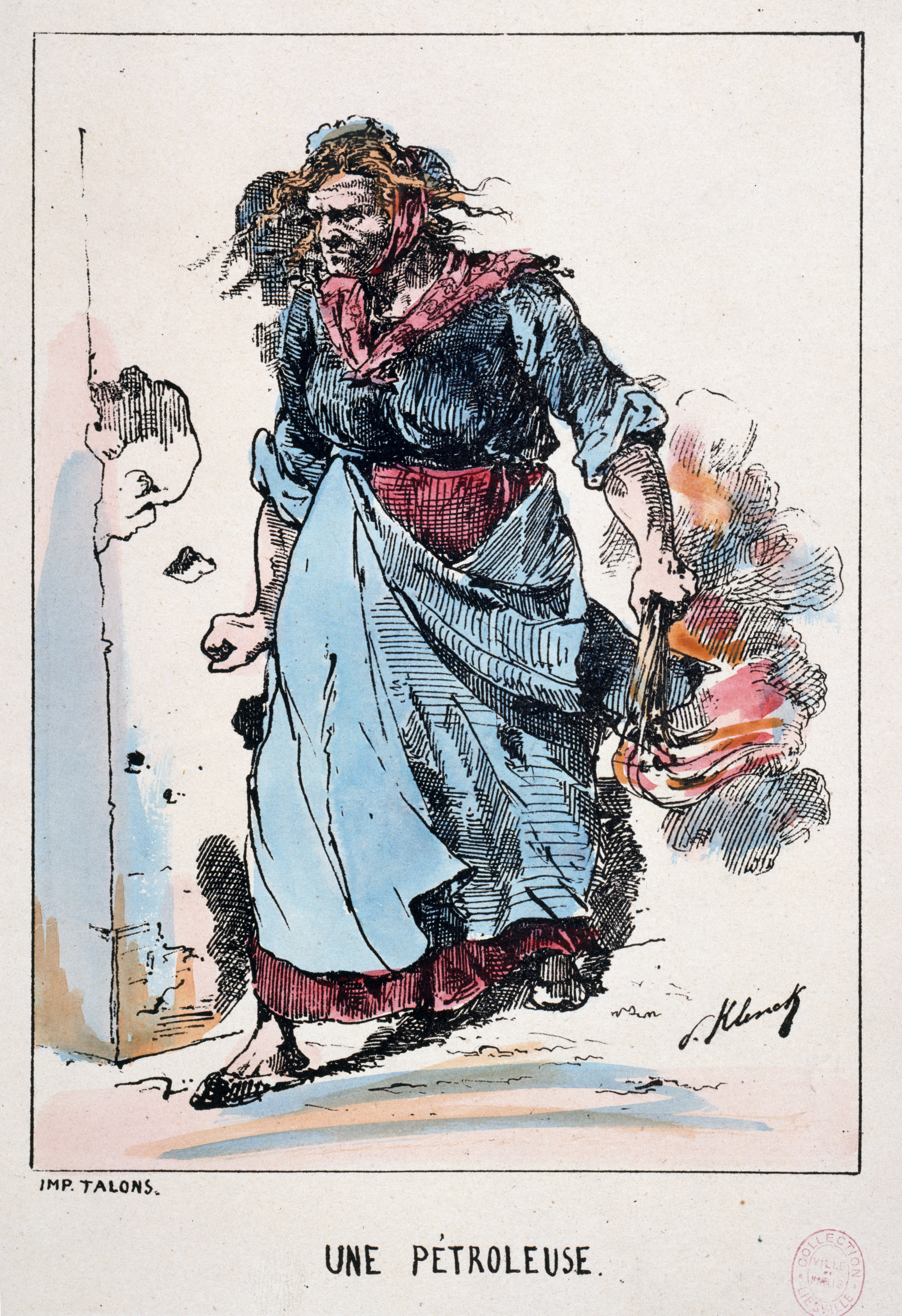
Une pétroleuse. Lithograph by Paul Klenck, Musée Carnavalet, Paris.

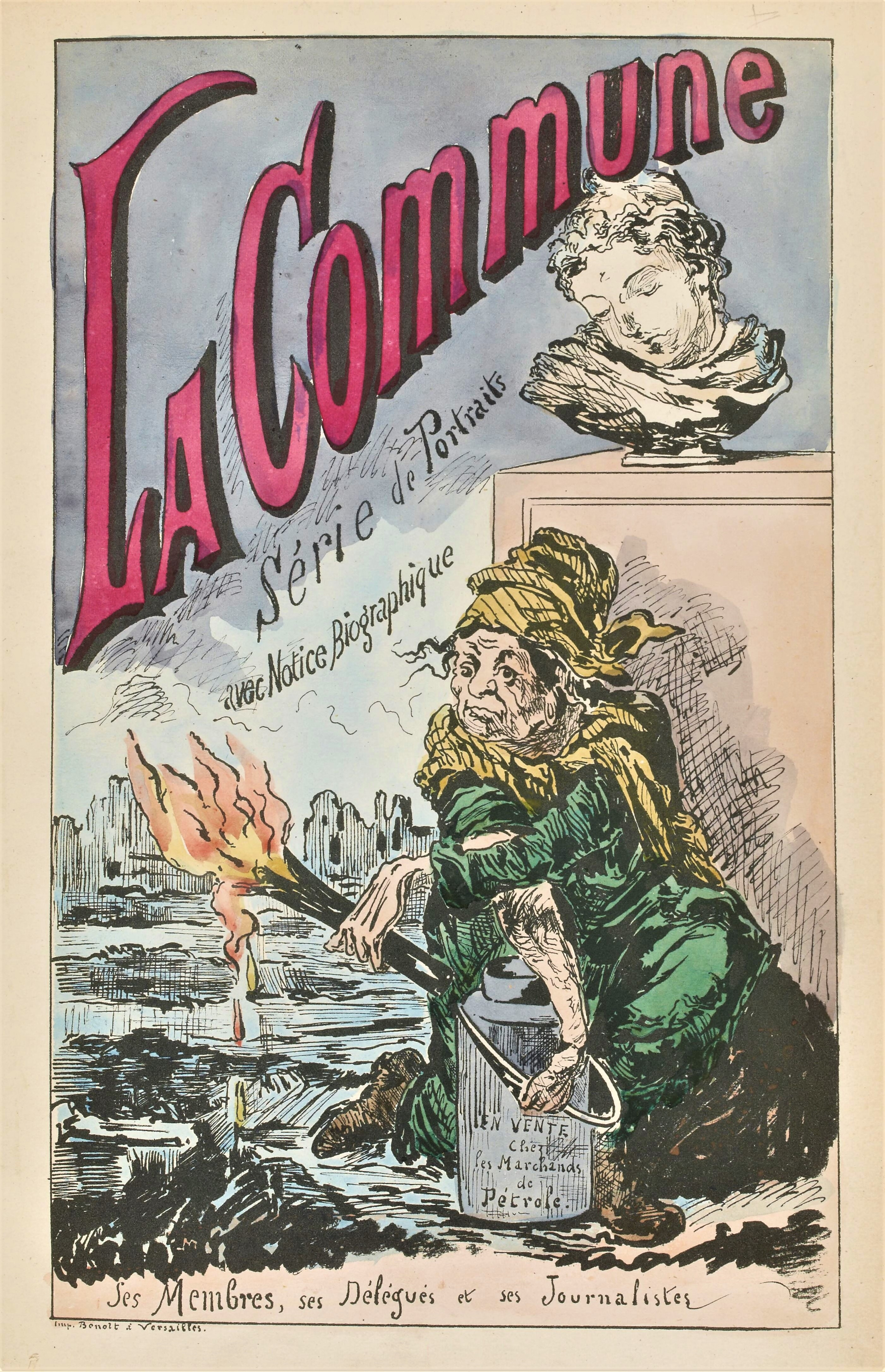
La Commune: série de portraits avec notice biographique, Paris, Mordret, 1871. Bibliothèque nationale de France

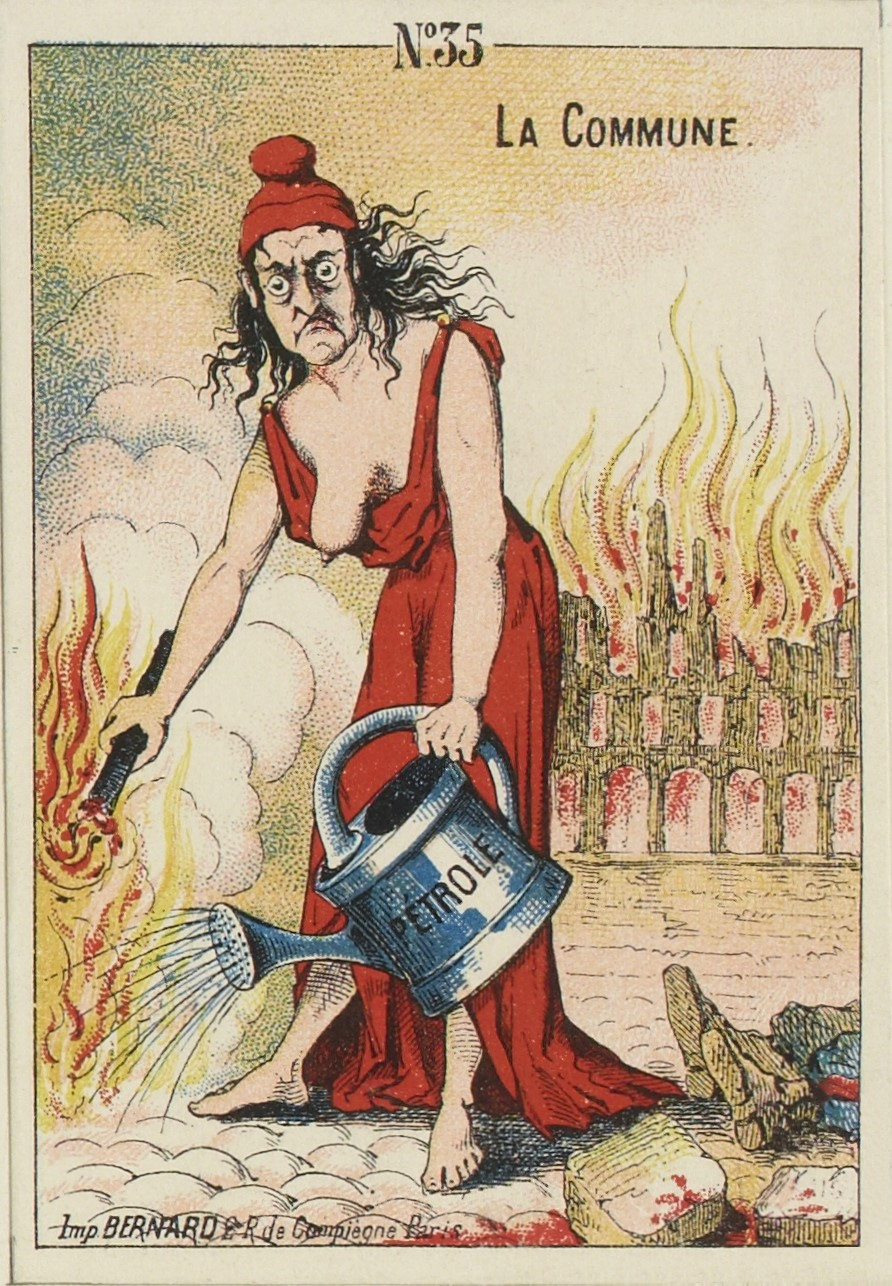
The Commune. Lithograph, Musée Carnavalet, Paris, 1871.

This imagery reflected deeper cultural fears of women who stepped outside conventional roles. The association of fire with female madness, hysteria, and social disorder turned the torch—typically a symbol of liberty—into an emblem of chaos. In this way, the pétroleuse became both a tool of anti-Communard propaganda and a lasting figure in the mythology of the Commune.

=== Burnt memory ===
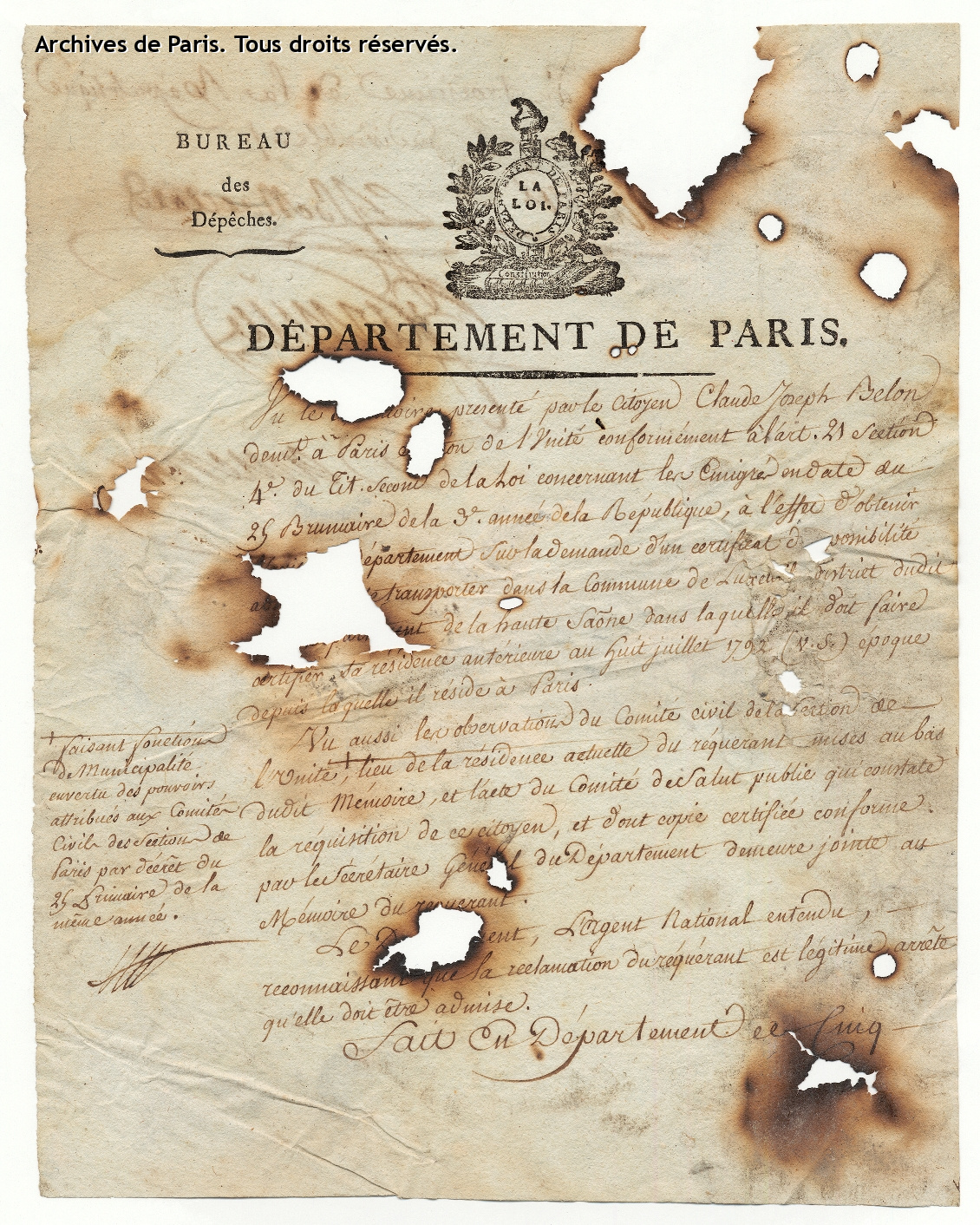
Document from 1795 rescued from the fire at Paris City Hall in May 1871. Archives de Paris.

The fires during the final days of the Paris Commune caused extensive damage to the city’s cultural and administrative heritage. Among the most significant losses were the archives of the City of Paris and the Palais de Justice. The destruction of the civil registry and Court of Cassation records was particularly severe. At the Hôtel de Ville, parish registers dating back to the 16th century and civil records from 1792 to 1859 were destroyed. Although duplicate records existed, they were housed in the Palais de Justice and were also lost to the flames. In response, a civil records reconstruction commission operated from 1872 to 1897, ultimately restoring over 2.5 million records—about a third of those lost. The commission relied on documents submitted by individuals, church registers, death indexes, and other sources.

Other institutions also suffered heavy losses. The archives of the Assistance publique, housed near the Hôtel de Ville, were largely destroyed, along with parts of France’s financial records and the majority of the Paris Police Prefecture's archives. Only a fraction of the police archives survived, preserved in a vault on rue de Jérusalem that had originally been designed to protect the Venus de Milo during the Prussian siege.

Several libraries were also consumed by fire, including those of the Louvre, the Hôtel de Ville, and the Paris Bar Association. The Louvre library, which held around 100,000 volumes, and the Hôtel de Ville library, containing approximately 150,000 volumes, were entirely destroyed. The Louvre’s cabinet of manuscripts, including items dating back to the reign of Charles the Bald, was also lost. Artistic works by major figures such as Charles Le Brun, Antoine Coysevox, Ingres, and Eugène Delacroix were destroyed in the fires. At the Gobelins Manufactory, 75 historic tapestries from the 15th to 18th centuries were lost. The scale of cultural and archival destruction became a central point of criticism against the Commune, contributing to the lasting perception of the event as one of violent cultural rupture.

== Ruins and reconstruction ==
=== Ruin tourism ===
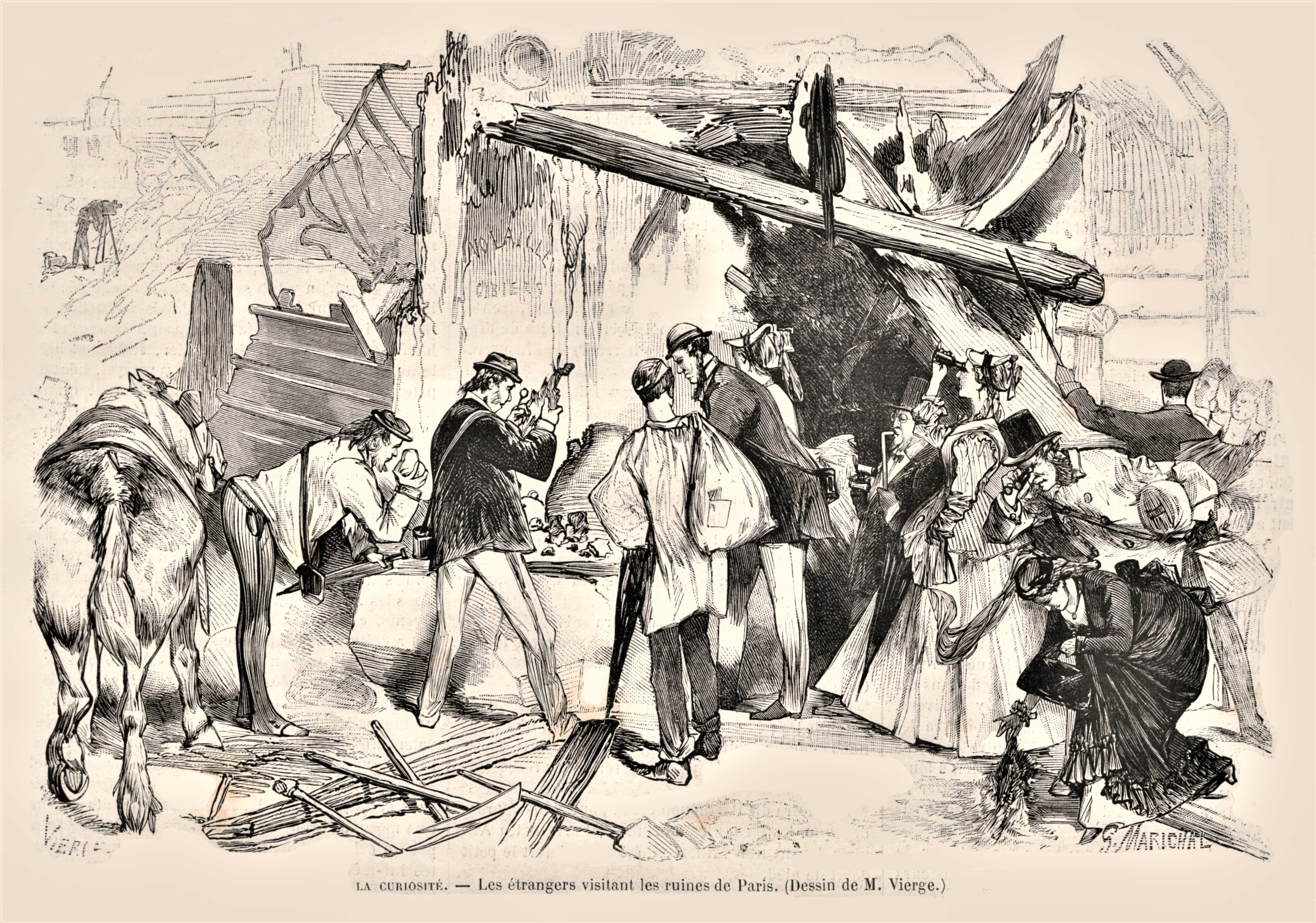
Curiosity. Foreigners visiting the ruins of Paris. Engraving by Daniel Vierge, Le Monde illustré, 24 June 1871. Bibliothèque historique de la ville de Paris.

By June 1871, the ruins left in the wake of the Paris Commune had become a popular attraction. Parisians, often accompanied by family or friends, visited the damaged sites despite the risks posed by unstable structures. Foreign tourists, particularly from England, were also drawn to the spectacle.

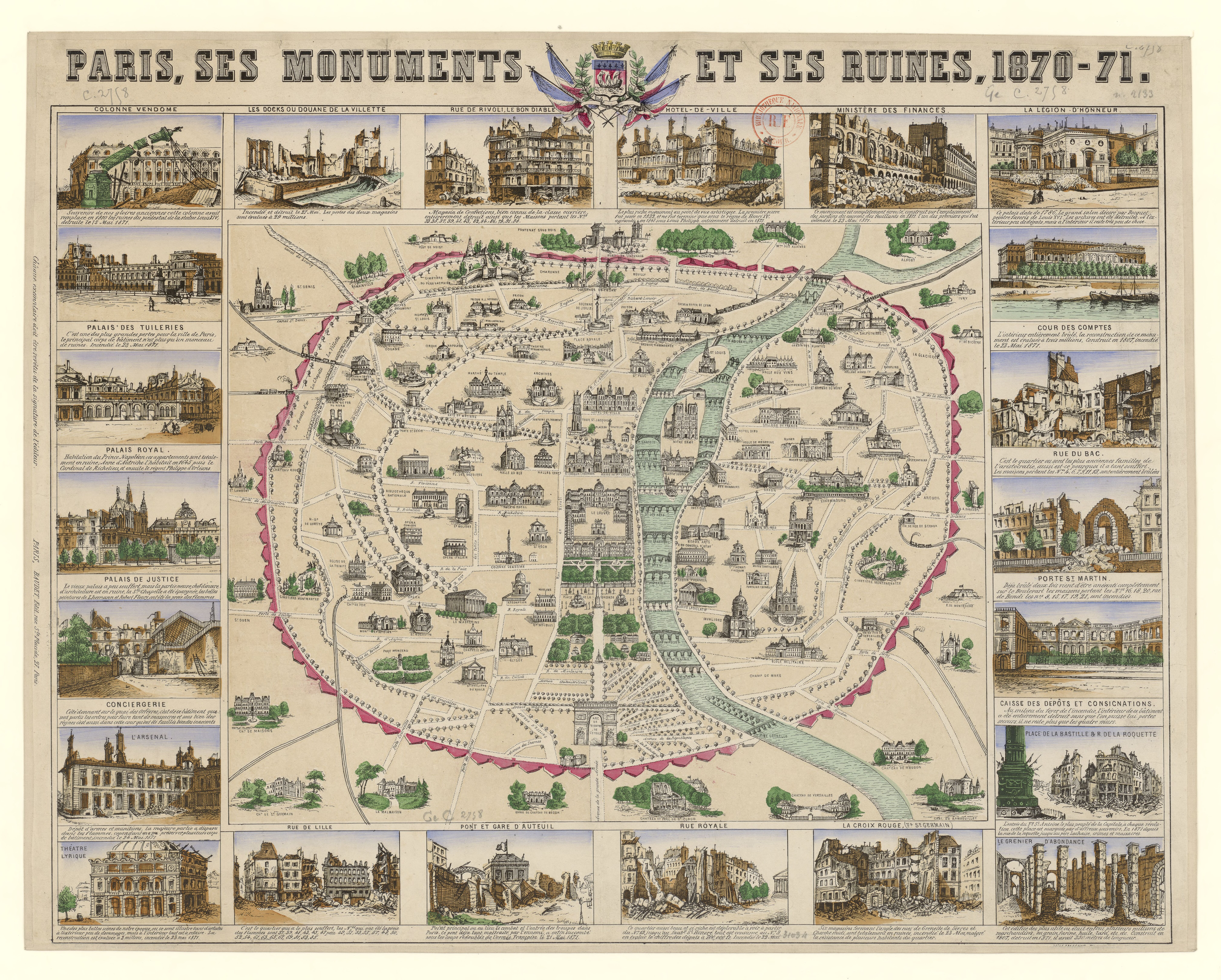
Paris, its monuments and ruins. Guide map of 1871, published by Baudel.

Publishers quickly responded to this interest by producing illustrated maps and guidebooks, such as Paris, ses monuments et ses ruines, 1870–71, Guide à travers les ruines, and Itinéraire des ruines de Paris, which offered multi-day tours across affected areas.

These publications emphasized central Paris, particularly the right bank between Place Vendôme and Bastille and the Bastille, with frequent focus on the Tuileries Palace and the Hôtel de Ville. Visitors often collected debris, including shell fragments and remnants of monuments, as souvenirs.

Numerous photographic collections were also published beginning in 1871. These images, while presented as objective documentation, were shaped by selective framing and thematic choices. Photographs from the period typically emphasized two key subjects: the physical ruins and the violence of Bloody Week. This visual focus contributed to a narrative that portrayed the Commune as a destructive and regressive event, overshadowing its political complexity. According to historian Hélène Lewandowski, such imagery helped to "confine the Commune within the confines of Bloody Week," reinforcing its reputation as an incendiary and iconoclastic episode in French history.

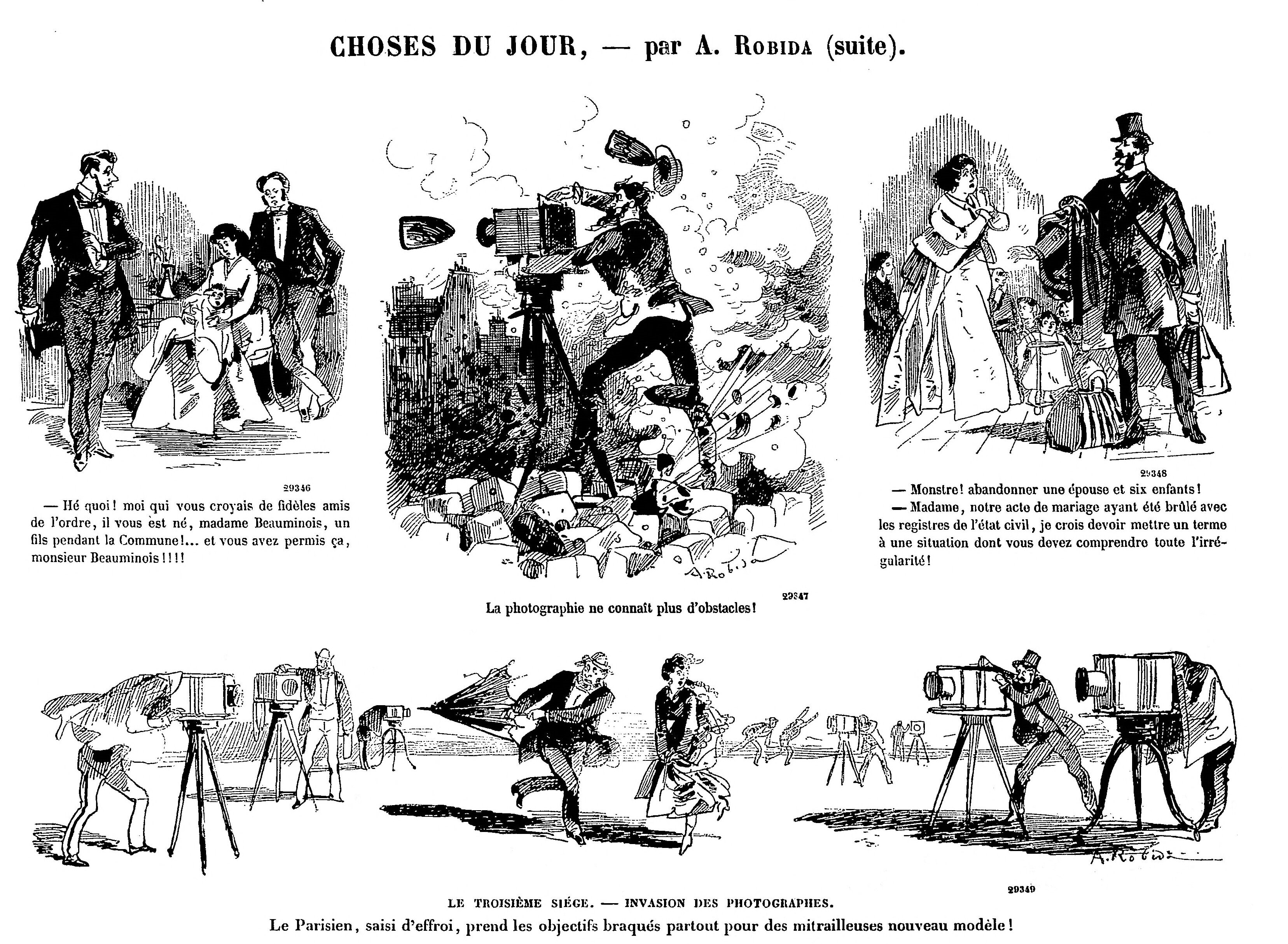
The third siege. - Invasion of the photographers. Albert Robida caricatures the vogue for snapshots of Paris after the Commune. Journal amusant, 1 July 1871.

In 1871–1872, approximately half of all photographs submitted for legal deposit in France were related to the Paris Commune, with around two-thirds depicting the ruins of the city. A total of 735 images focused specifically on the damaged urban landscape. This visual production was shaped by the legacy of the Second Empire, during which photography had been used as a tool of state propaganda. In 1871, the Versailles government revived this practice, commissioning or encouraging images that emphasized the extent of destruction in Paris. During the Commune itself, many photographers—including André-Adolphe-Eugène Disdéri—ceased operations due to exile, hiding, or the general disruption of business. However, after the end of Bloody Week, a number of photographers returned to document the aftermath, contributing to the growing phenomenon of "ruin tourism".

These photographs often featured tightly cropped views of heavily damaged buildings, omitting wider context and thereby exaggerating the impression of a city in total ruin. While these images supported the Versailles narrative of widespread devastation, they also reflected a developing aesthetic of the ruin. Utilitarian structures such as the Grenier d’abondance were depicted in ways that evoked classical antiquity, their arcades and columns reinterpreted as romantic remnants. Similarly, the façades of the Hôtel de Ville and the Ministry of Finance were photographed for their picturesque qualities. Photographers frequently explored interior rubble to capture details that conformed to contemporary ideas of what constituted a "ruin". The commercial success of these photographic collections can be attributed to this dual purpose: they both documented the destruction caused by the fires and offered an aestheticized, almost sublime, vision of the aftermath.

Photographs of the ruins of Paris published after Bloody Week

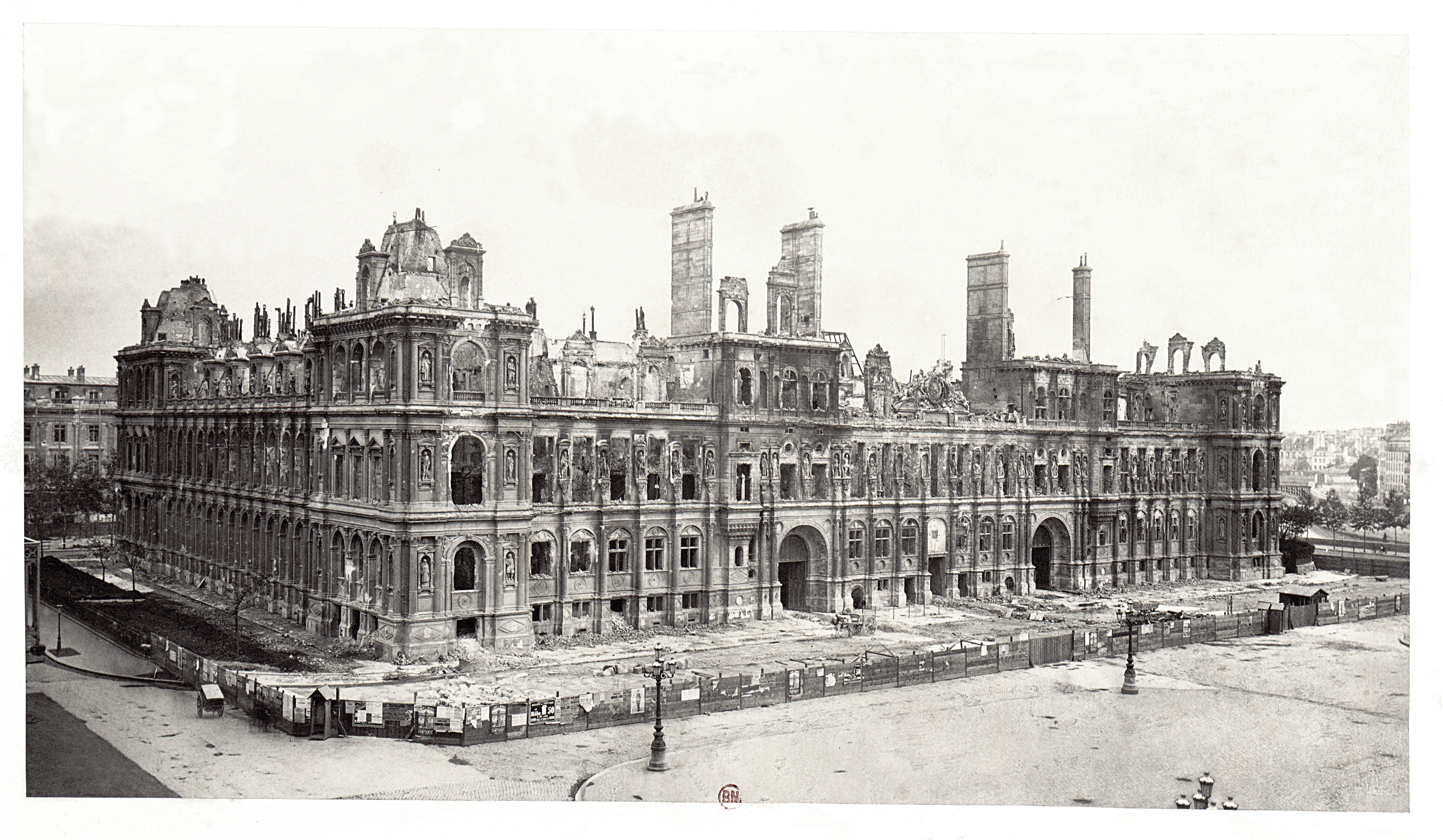
Paris City Hall. Photograph published in 1872.

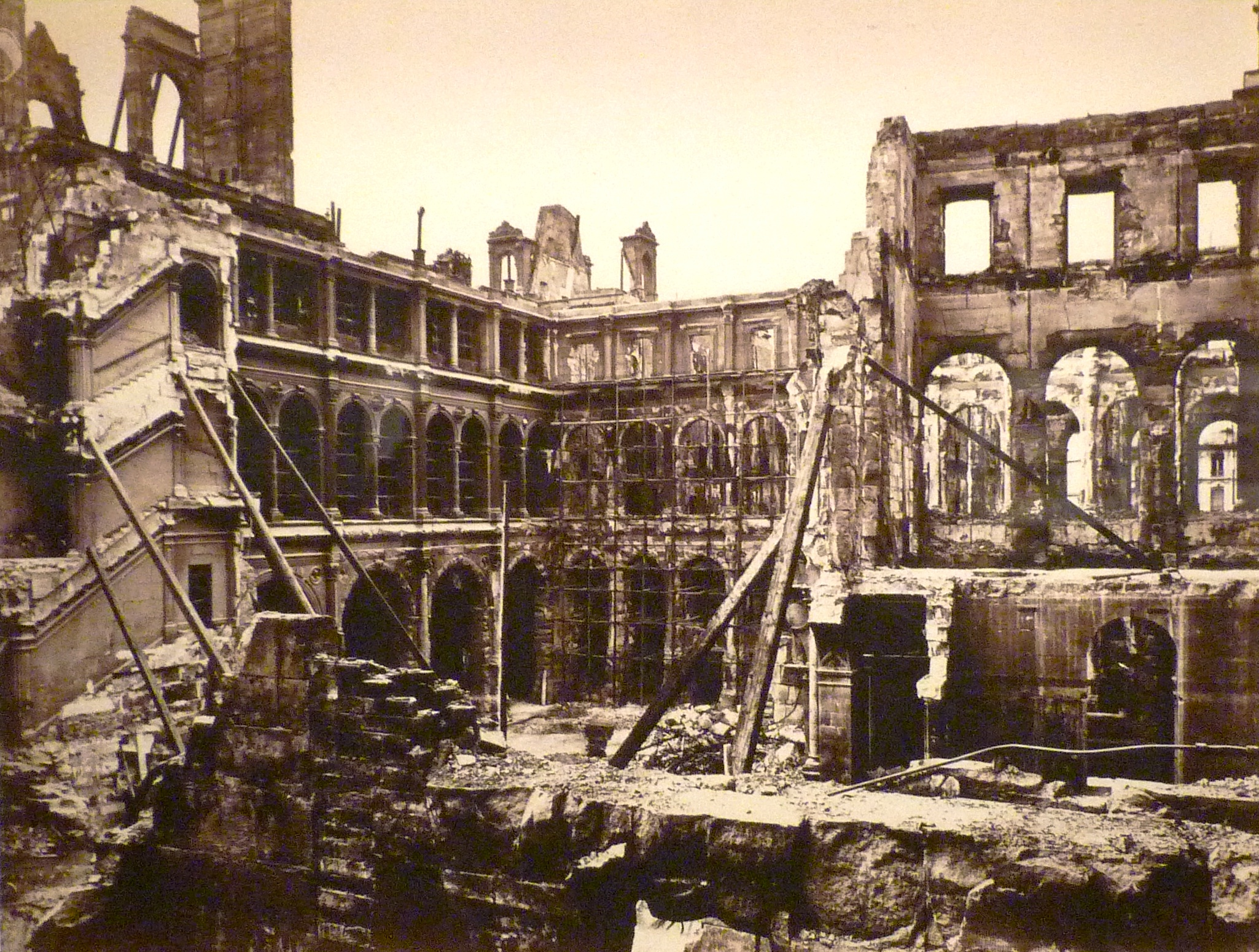
Paris City Hall, inner courtyard. Photograph by Alphonse Liébert, 1871. Bibliothèque historique de la ville de Paris.

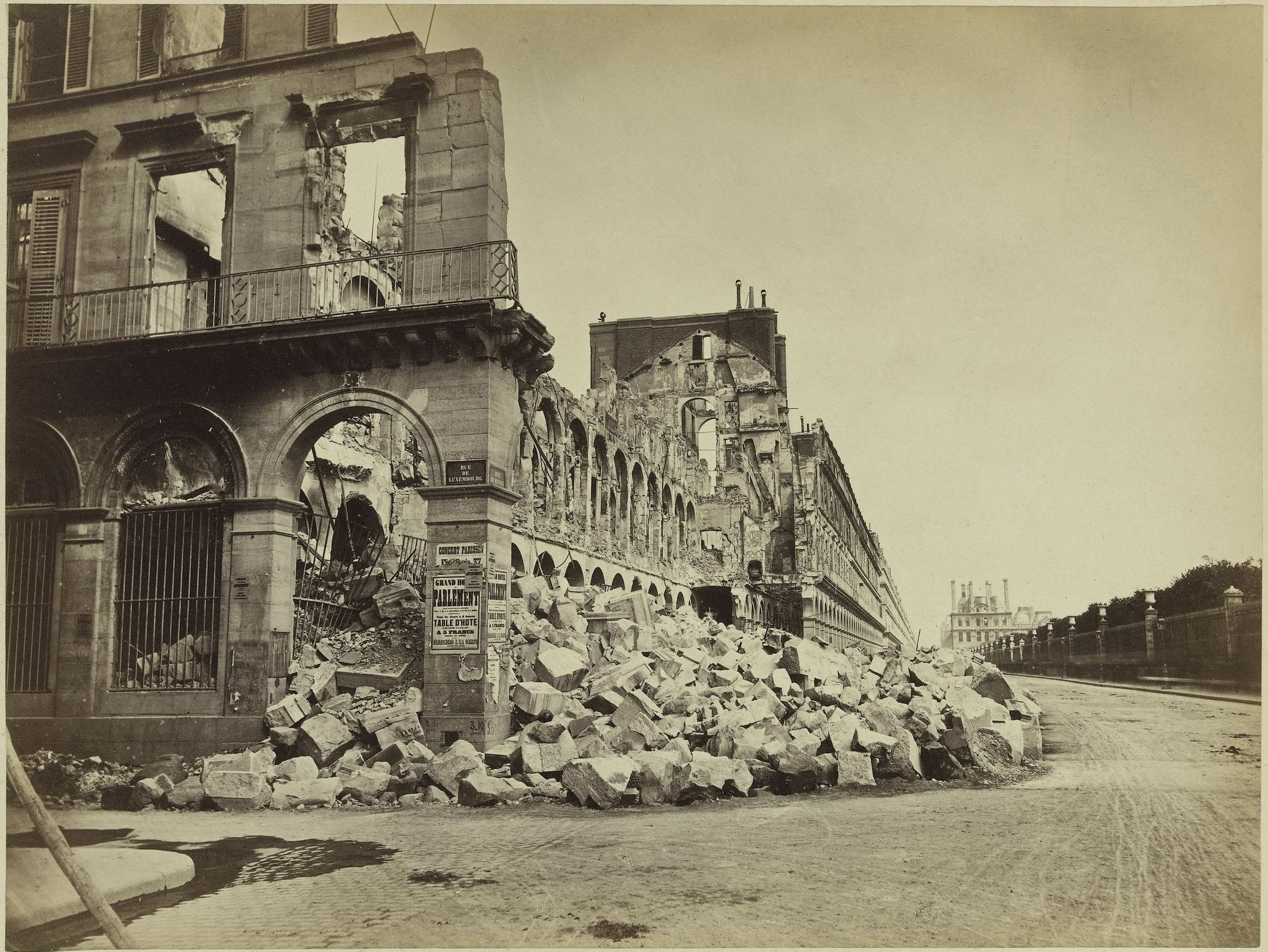
Ministry of Finance, rue de Rivoli.

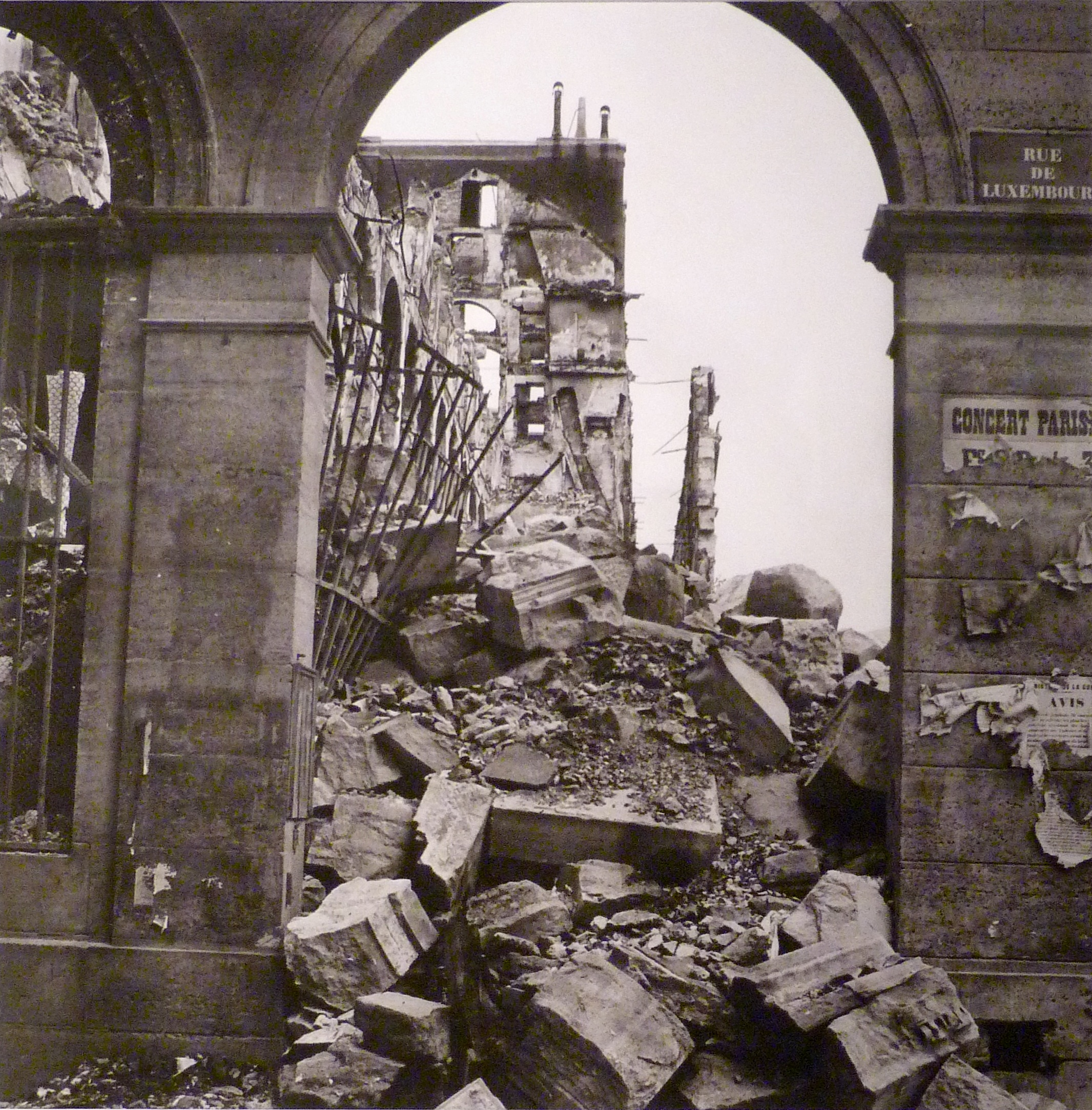
Ministry of Finance, rue de Rivoli. Photograph published in 1871. Bibliothèque historique de la ville de Paris

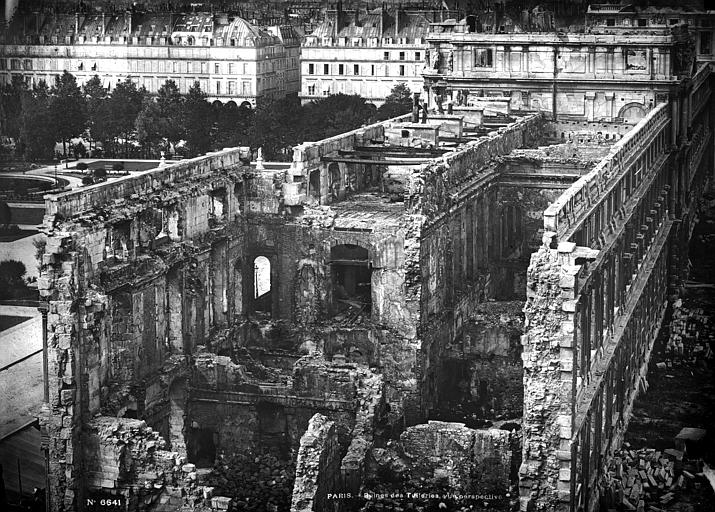
Tuileries Palace. Photograph by Jean-Eugène Durand.

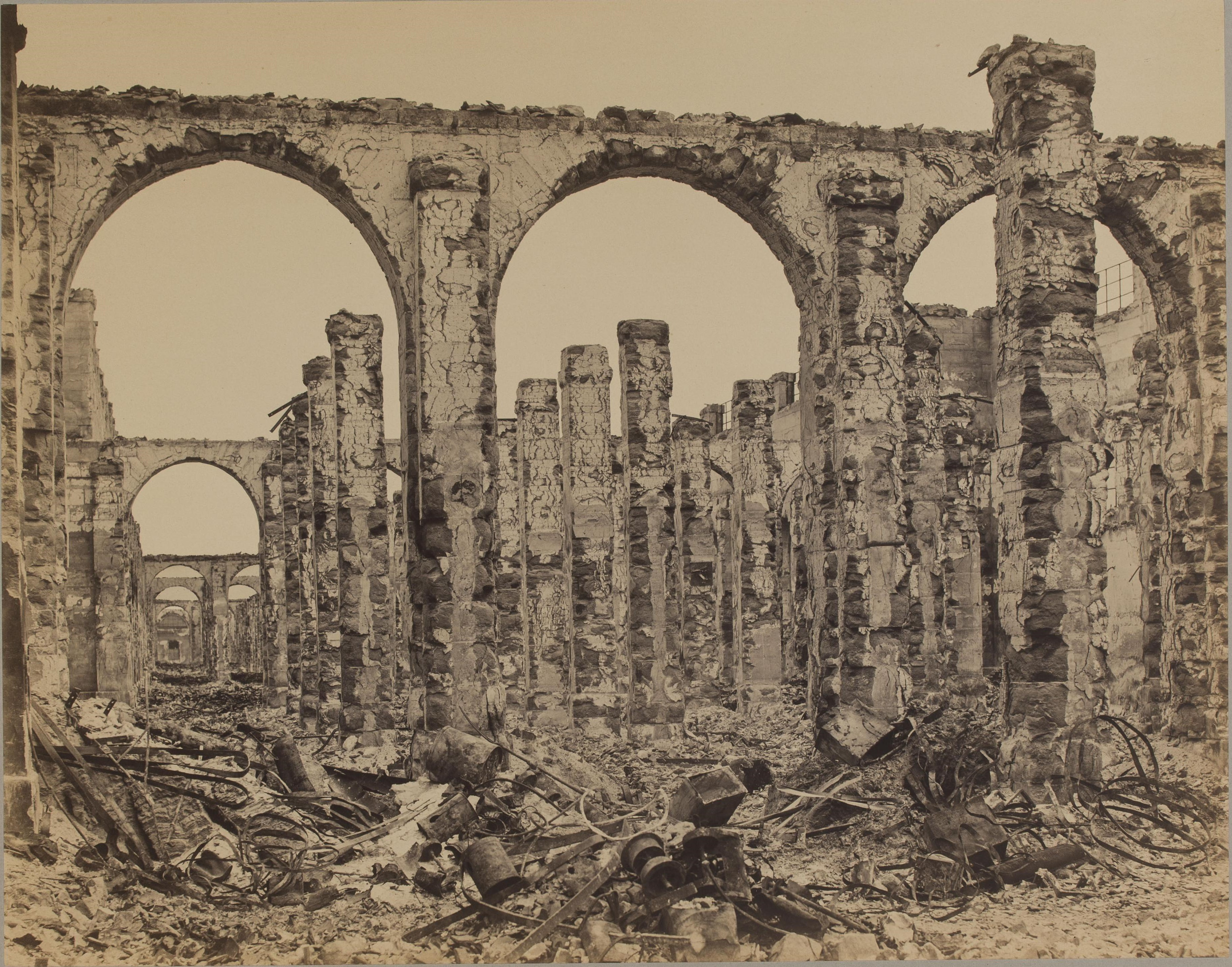
Attic of abundance. Photograph by Jean Andrieu. Paris Museums.

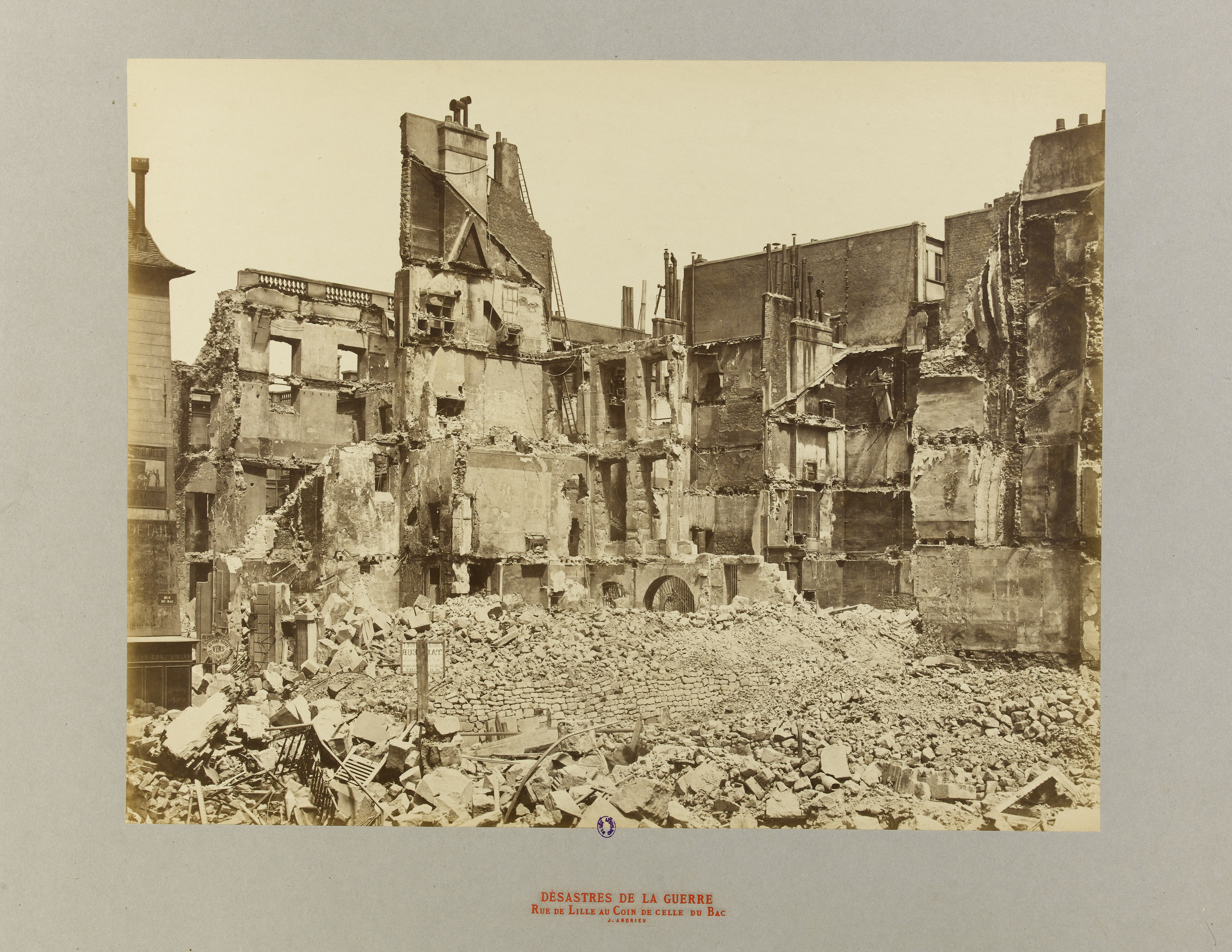
Corner of rue de Lille and rue du Bac. Photograph by Jean Andrieu. 1871, Musée Carnavalet, Paris

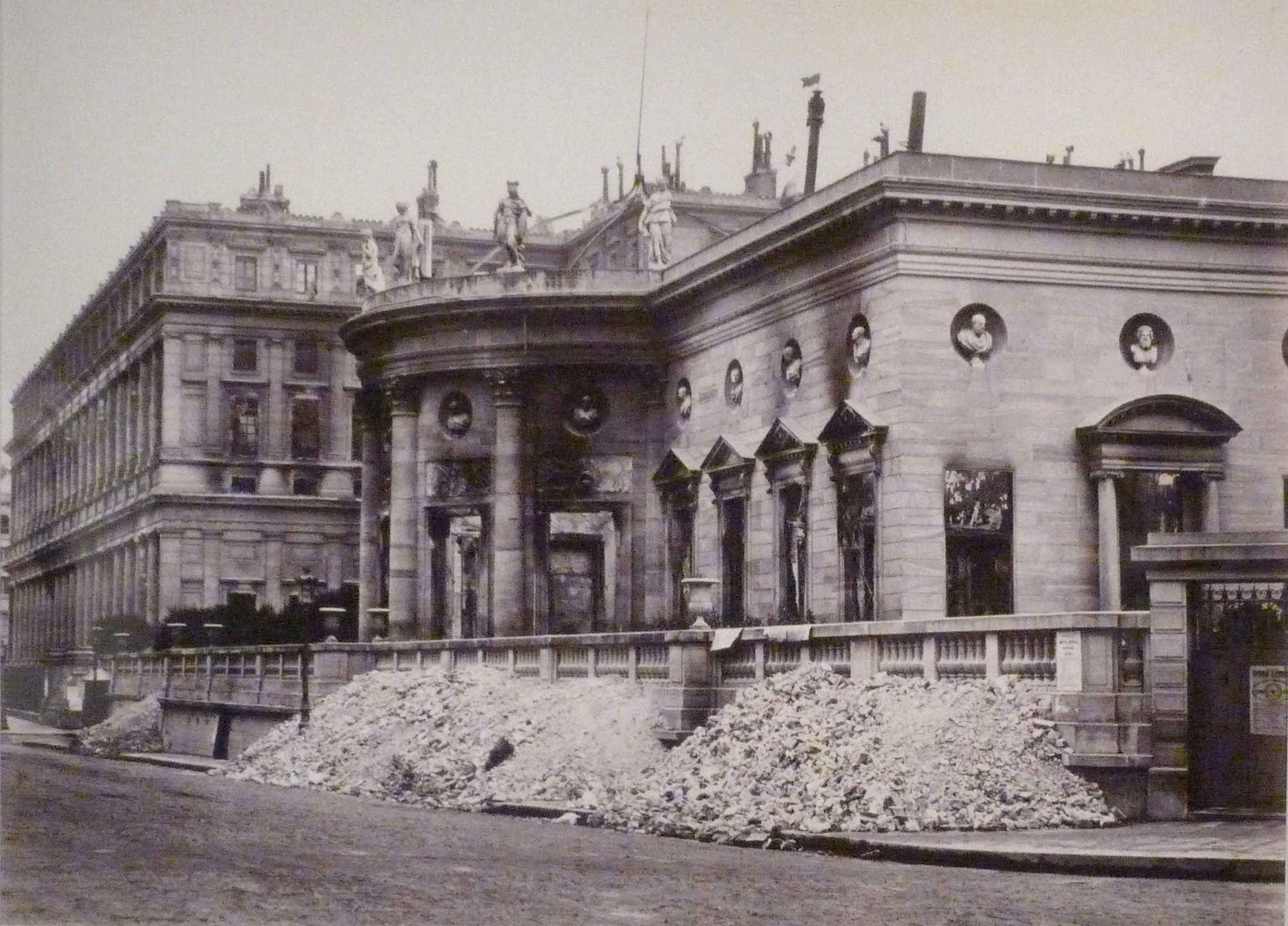
Palais de la Légion d'Honneur, with the Palais d'Orsay in the background. Musée Carnavalet, Paris.

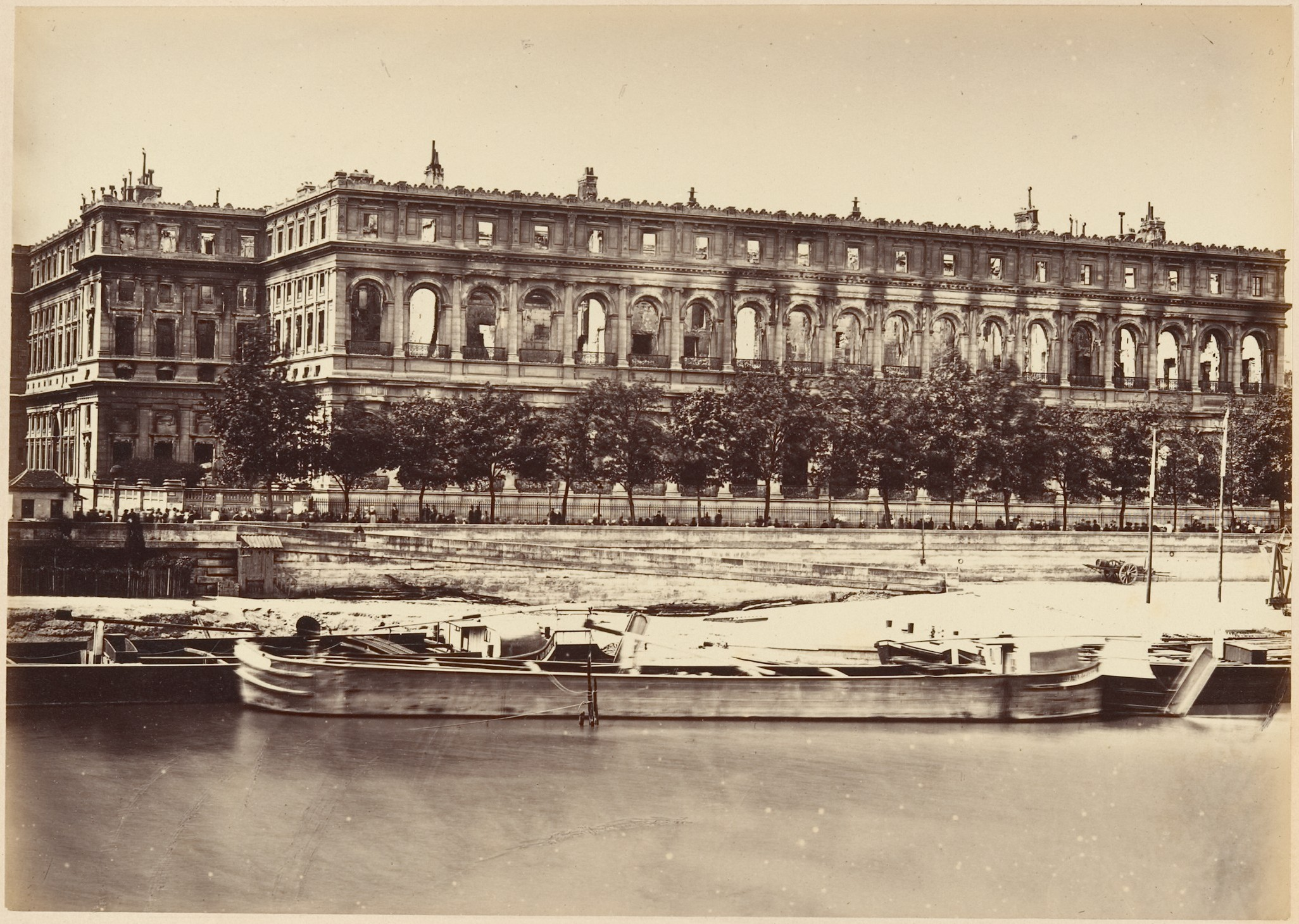
Palais d'Orsay. Photograph by Alphonse Liébert, 1871. Metropolitan Museum of Art.

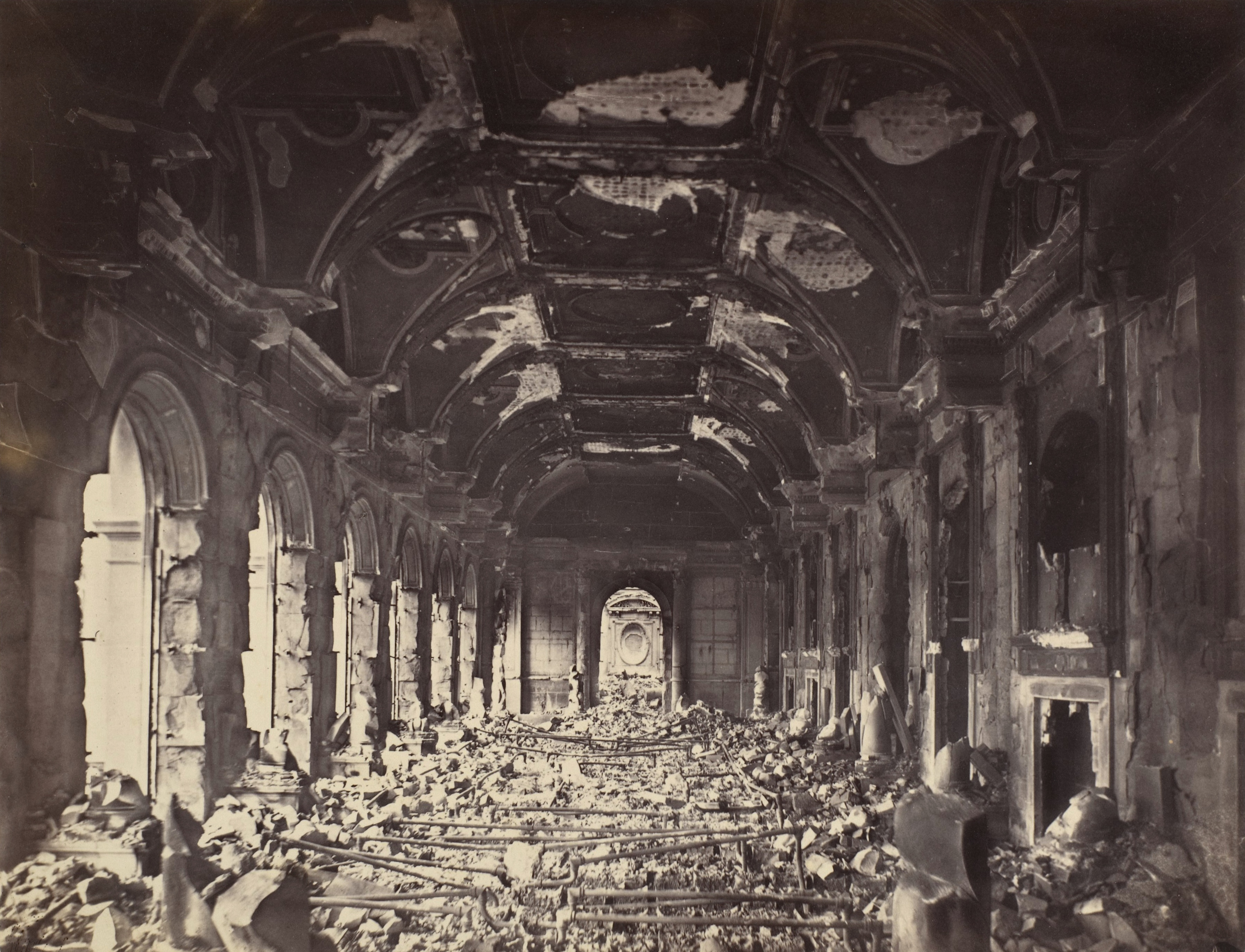
Grande salle du Conseil d'État, in the Palais d'Orsay. Photograph by Charles Soulier, 1871. Metropolitan Museum of Art.

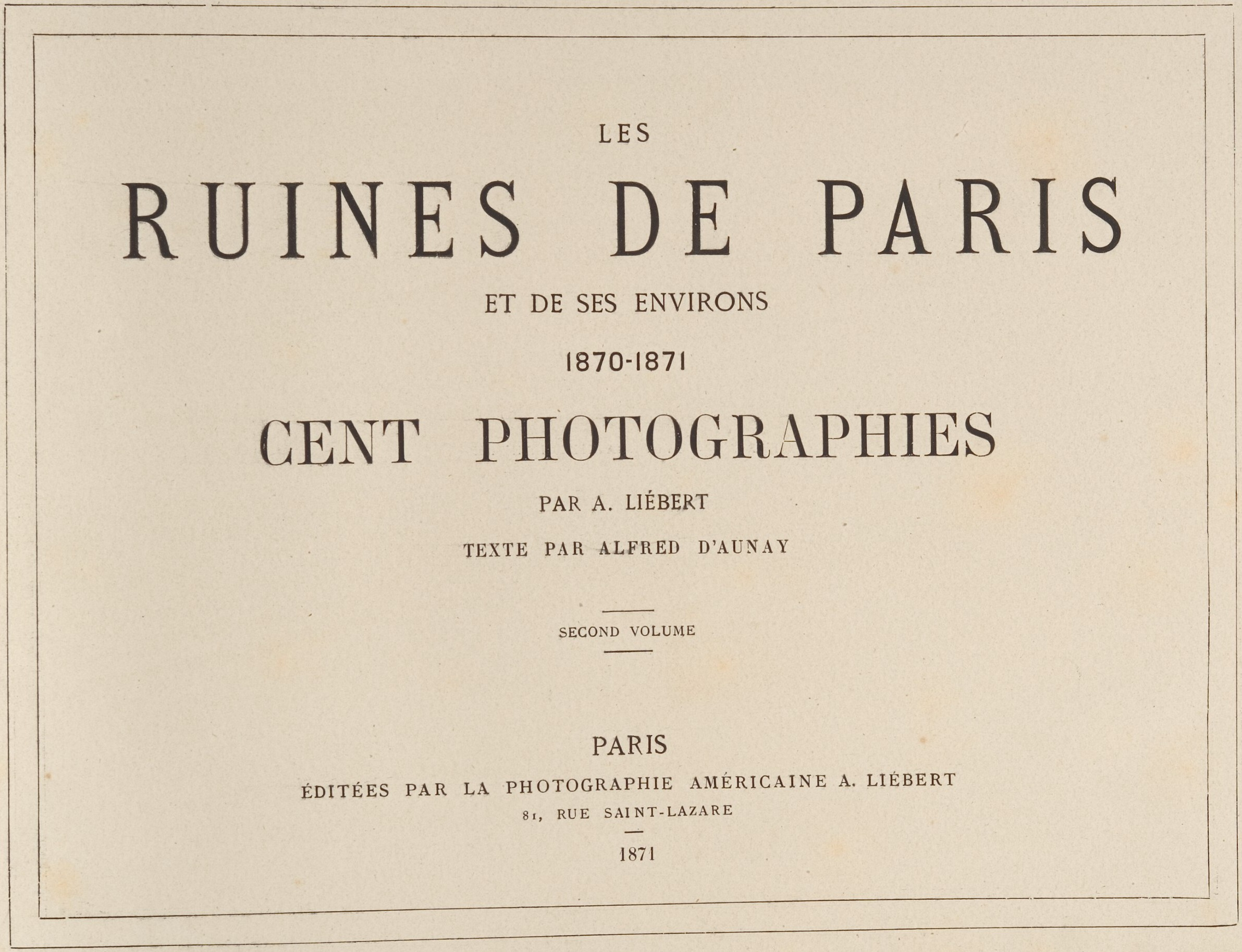
Title page of a collection of photographs published in 1871. Metropolitan Museum of Art.

=== The beauty and exoticism of Parisian ruins ===
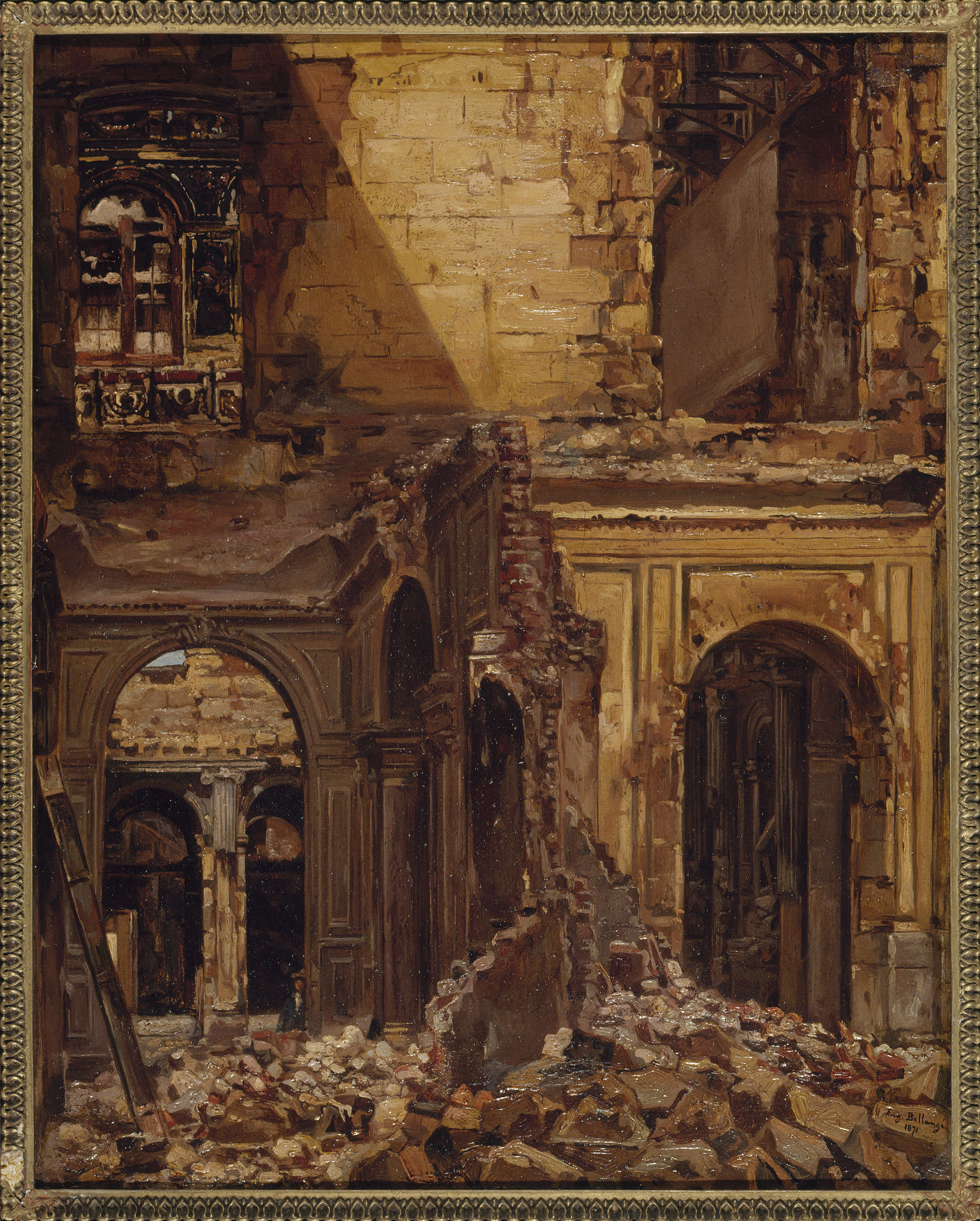
Ruins of the Tuileries after the fire of 1871, oil on canvas by Eugène Bellangé, Paris, Musée Carnavalet.

The 19th century was marked by a widespread cultural fascination with ruins, and this sensibility deeply influenced how the remains of the Paris Commune were perceived. The monuments destroyed by fire in 1871—such as the Hôtel de Ville and the Tuileries—were not immediately rebuilt, and their ruined forms remained part of the Parisian landscape for years. These structures were often viewed through a romantic lens, with contemporary observers emphasizing their aesthetic and emotional resonance. On 3 June 1871, poet Augustine-Malvina Blanchecotte wrote in Tablettes d'une femme pendant la Commune that the ruins of the Hôtel de Ville resembled a dreamscape, describing "aerial arches," "fantastic doors," and "dizzy staircases" as expressions of haunting beauty. Similarly, Edmond de Goncourt characterized the ruins in vivid, almost operatic terms, noting the colored stones and charred iron as reminiscent of an Italian palace or a fantastical stage set.

Comparisons with famous archaeological sites were frequent. British observer Sir William Erskine, writing on 7 June 1871, likened the Parisian ruins to those of Amalfi, Tung-hoor, and Rome, calling the Hôtel de Ville "superb" despite condemning the Communards. Other visitors and writers referenced Baalbek and Palmyra. Even Louise Michel, a staunch defender of the Commune, acknowledged the evocative power of the ruins. For her, the destroyed Hôtel de Ville symbolized both despair and a lingering hope for future justice, describing its empty windows as "the eyes of the dead" watching for a peace yet to come.

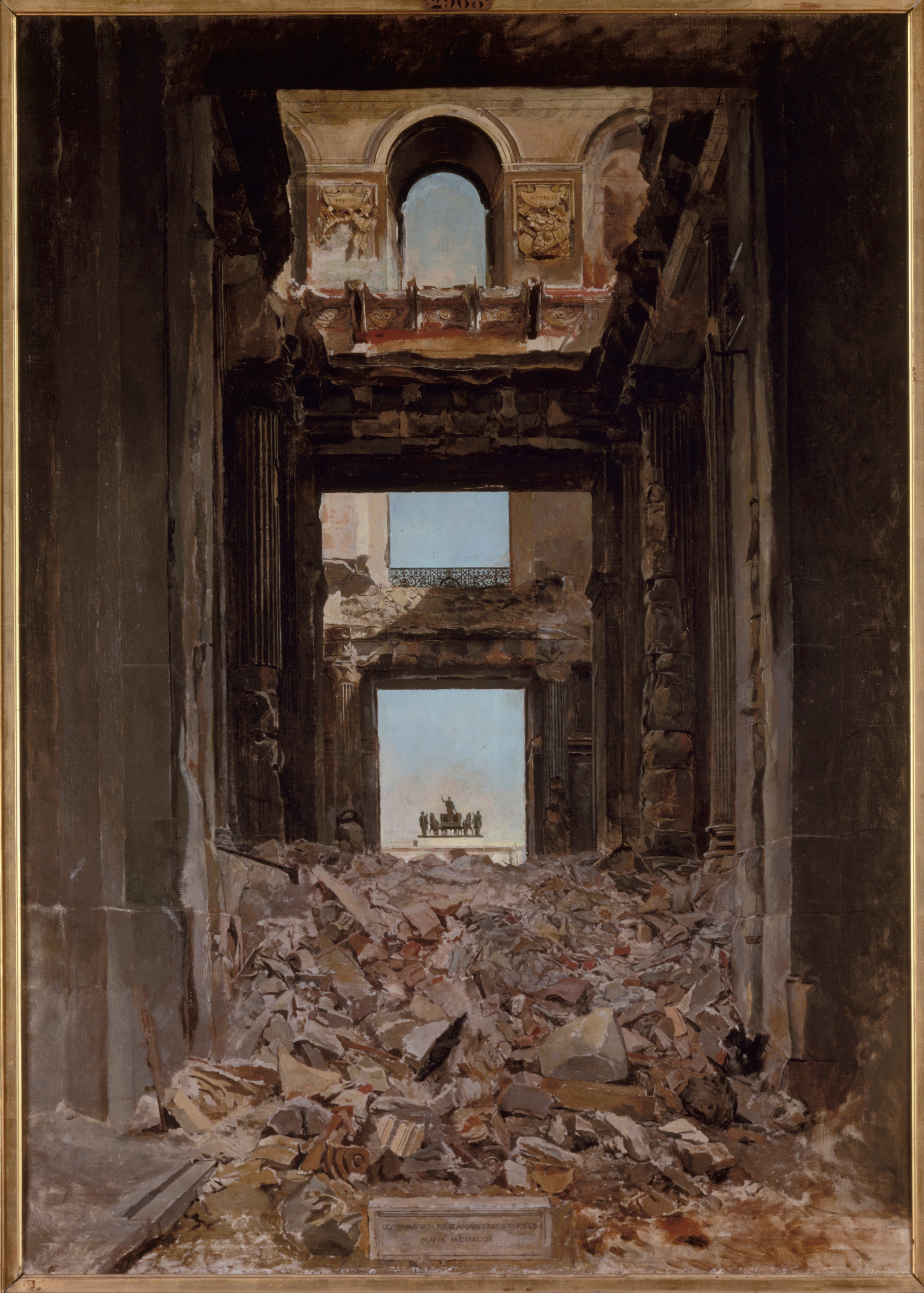
The Tuileries (May 1871). Oil on canvas by Ernest Meissonier, begun in 1871 and completed in 1883. Château de Compiègne.

Among the ruins left by the fires of 1871, the Ministry of Finance—previously considered a utilitarian and aesthetically unremarkable structure—came to be appreciated for its resemblance to ancient ruins. However, it was the remains of the Hôtel de Ville that drew the most admiration. Its fragmented, jagged silhouette and precarious forms captured the romantic ideal of the picturesque ruin. This aestheticization of destruction was echoed by contemporary writers such as Joris-Karl Huysmans, who satirically suggested that fire enhanced the beauty of modern monuments, declaring that "fire is the essential artist of our time ". Observers noted, however, a key distinction between Parisian ruins and their ancient counterparts: the absence of vegetation. The scorched remains of 19th-century buildings created the illusion of antiquity, generating what has been described as an "archaeological fiction"—a form of artificial aging produced by fire rather than time.

The tension between artistic appreciation and moral unease was acknowledged by critics such as Louis Énault, who admitted that "the artist killed the citizen in me," finding beauty in scenes of devastation.

This duality is reflected in visual art as well. In The Tuileries (May 1871), painted by Ernest Meissonier and exhibited in 1883, the viewer is placed amid the ruins of the Tuileries Palace, specifically in the Salle des Maréchaux. The painting foregrounds a heap of rubble—the remnants of the grand staircase—while in the background, the Arc de Triomphe du Carrousel invokes the legacy of the First Empire. Initially intended as a critique of the Commune, the work acquired a nostalgic quality after the final demolition of the Tuileries in 1883. A Latin inscription at the base, Gloria Maiorum per flammas usque superstes, further associates the ruins with Roman grandeur and continuity through destruction.

The fires of 1871 also influenced literary depictions, fictional and speculative accounts of Paris as a ruined city. The visual and poetic fascination with destroyed monuments drew on contemporary visual and poetic responses, portraying the ruins as both warnings and subjects of aesthetic reflection.

=== Rebuilding ===
On 27 May 1871, while fighting was still ongoing in Paris, Adolphe Thiers appointed Jean-Charles Adolphe Alphand—an engineer who had previously worked under Georges-Eugène Haussmann—as Director of Works for the city. Several architects who had been active under the Second Empire, including Théodore Ballu, Gabriel Davioud, Paul Abadie, and Hector-Martin Lefuel, continued their careers under the newly established Third Republic. By the summer of 1871, the State and the City of Paris had recovered sufficient financial resources to begin restoration and rebuilding efforts. Initial work focused on clearing debris and repairing less severely damaged monuments.

Roughly half of the thirty or so public monuments affected by fire had been constructed during the Second Empire and were not widely seen as historically significant. As a result, their destruction was not universally mourned, even by preservationists such as Eugène Viollet-le-Duc. Nonetheless, public debate emerged over whether some ruins—particularly those of the Hôtel de Ville—should be preserved. Le Figaro published letters advocating for the retention of the rubble, and figures like Étienne Arago argued for keeping the ruins as educational symbols. Arago suggested that surrounding the site with a public garden would create a unique historical landmark and serve as a civic lesson.

Despite these proposals, administrative needs prevailed. The Hôtel de Ville was reconstructed in its original style and completed in 1882.

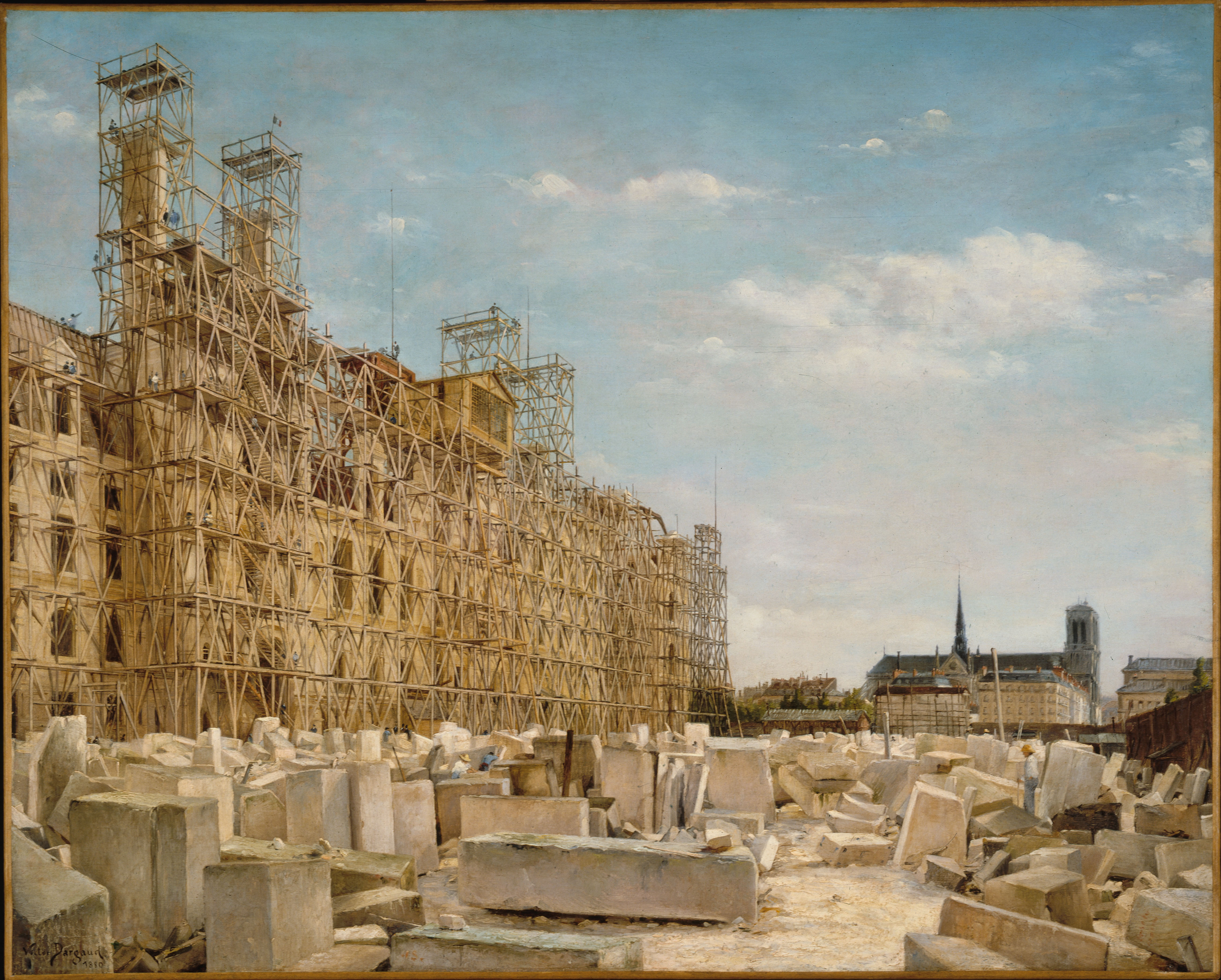
L'Hôtel de ville en reconstruction, oil on canvas by Paul-Joseph-Victor Dargaud, Musée Carnavalet, Paris, 1880.

The ruins of the Tuileries Palace, which had also sparked debate over whether to rebuild or preserve them as ruins, were ultimately demolished in 1883–1884. Numerous reconstruction proposals were submitted, reflecting the Republic's ambivalence about permanently erasing this symbol of the Second Empire. Some restoration proceeded more quickly. The Palais de la Légion d'honneur was rebuilt between 1871 and 1874, financed by members of the Legion of Honour.

In general, rebuilding in the 1870s followed the trajectory set during the Haussmann era, completing pre-war projects while adapting to new political and economic priorities. except that the Third Republic built more utilitarian buildings linked to the industrial revolution than palaces. Under the Third Republic, emphasis shifted toward functional and utilitarian architecture aligned with the industrial age, in contrast to the monumental style of the Second Empire. Historian Hélène Lewandowski has suggested that the fires of 1871 provided an opportunity for the new regime to promote a more sober and practical architectural vision. One of the last remnants of the destruction, the Palais d'Orsay—former home of the Cour des Comptes—remained standing until it was acquired in 1897 by the Compagnie du chemin de fer de Paris à Orléans. The site was repurposed for the construction of the Gare d'Orsay, completed for the 1900 Exposition Universelle.

== See also ==
- Paris Commune
- Crimes de la commune
- Second French Empire

== Bibliography ==
- Caron, Jean-Claude (2006). Les feux de la discorde: Conflits et incendies dans la France du XIXe siècle (in French). Paris: Hachette Littératures. ISBN 978-2-01-235683-2. Archived from the original on 1 December 2023.
- Fournier, Éric (2008). Paris en ruines: Du Paris haussmannien au Paris communard (in French). Paris: Imago. ISBN 978-2-84952-051-2.
- Jacquin, Emmanuel (1990). La direction des Beaux-Arts et les incendies de mai 1871. Bulletin de la Société de l'histoire de Paris et de l'Ile-de-France.
- Lewandowski, Hélène (2018). La face cachée de la Commune (in French). Paris: Éditions du Cerf. ISBN 978-2-204-12164-4.
- Lewandowski, Hélène (2021). "L'écran de fumée des incendies de la Commune de 1871". Cahiers d'histoire (148): 125–142. doi:10.4000/chrhc.15866. ISSN 1271-6669.
- Noël, Bernard (1978). Dictionnaire de la Commune (in French). Paris: Flammarion.
- Serman, William (1986). La Commune de Paris (1871) (in French). Paris: Fayard. ISBN 978-2-213-01354-1.
- Thomas, Édith (1986). "Les Pétroleuses". Bibliothèque de l'École des Chartes (in French). 124 (1). Paris: Gallimard: 334–336.
- Tillier, Bertrand (2004). La Commune de Paris, révolution sans image?: Politique et représentations dans la France républicaine, 1871-1914. Champ Vallon. doi:10.3917/sr.017.0373. ISBN 978-2-87673-390-9.
- Tombs, Robert (1997). La guerre contre Paris 1871 [Jean-Pierre]. Translated by Ricard. Paris: Aubier. ISBN 978-2-7007-0248-4.
