= Nadarajah =

Nadarajah நடராஜா నటరాజ
- Pronunciation: Naṭarājā
- Gender: Male
- Language: Tamil; Telugu; Malayalam

Origin
- Meaning: King of dance
- Region of origin: Southern India; North-eastern Sri Lanka

Other names
- Alternative spelling: Nadaraja; Nataraj; Nataraja; Natarajan

Nadarajah or Natarajan (Tamil: நடராஜா, Telugu: నటరాజ) is a South Indian male given name. Due to the South Indian tradition of using patronymic surnames it may also be a surname for males and females. It also Nataraja, a depiction of Hindu God Shiva.

== Notable people ==
=== Given name ===
- A. Natarajan, Indian politician
- A. K. C. Natarajan (born 1931), Indian musician
- A. R. Natarajan, Indian publisher
- B. Natarajan, Indian politician
- E. M. Natarajan (died 2001), Indian politician
- Indi Nadarajah, Malaysian actor and singer
- K. V. Nadarajah (1905–2000), Ceylonese lawyer and politician
- M. Nadarajah, Sri Lankan politician
- N. Nadarajah (1897–?), Ceylonese lawyer and judge
- N. S. N. Nataraj, Indian politician
- N. V. Natarajan (1912–1975), Indian politician
- Nadarajah Govindasamy, Singaporean convicted murderer
- Nataraja Guru (1895–1973), Indian social reformer
- Natarajan "Natty" Subramaniam, Indian actor and cinematographer
- P. R. Natarajan, Indian politician
- Pyramid Natarajan, Indian actor and producer
- R. Nataraja Mudaliar (1885–1972), Indian film director
- S. Nadarajah (died 1988), Sri Lankan lawyer and politician
- S. Natarajan, Indian politician
- Saralees Nadarajah (born 1965), British statistician
- T. Nadaraja (1917–2004), Sri Lankan lawyer and academic

=== Surname ===
- Bhuvana Natarajan, Indian author
- Jayanthi Natarajan (born 1954), Indian lawyer and politician
- Krishnakumar Natarajan, Indian businessman
- Natarajan Chandrasekaran (born 1963), Indian businessman
- Meenakshi Natarajan (born 1973), Indian politician
- Nataraja Ramakrishna (1923–2011), Indian dance guru
- Nadarajah Raviraj (1962–2006), Sri Lankan lawyer and politician
- Nadarajah Selvarajah (born 1954), Sri Lankan librarian, writer and bibliographer
- Nadarajah Shanmugarajah (1912–?), Ceylonese engineer
- Nadarajah Thangathurai (died 1983), Sri Lankan rebel
- Navya Natarajan, Indian actress
- Priyamvada Natarajan, Indian academic
