= Manavasi =

- Village
- Location within Tamil Nadu Location within India
- Coordinates: 10.933788°N 78.220556°E
- Country: India
- State: Tamil Nadu

Languages
  - Official: Tamil
- Time zone: UTC+5:30 (IST)

Manavasi is a village in Southern Indian state of Tamil Nadu between the cities of Karur and Trichy. It is located in the Karur district. It is the location of the Toll Plaza on the Karur - Trichy Highway. One of the oldest Lord Shiva temples is located in Manavasi, where Lord Shiva faces west.

For more than 800 years, on the Tamil month of Aadi on the 28th, on the way to pidari amman Kovil, a temple, Pankaligal (from the father's side) from different parts of Tamil Nadu assemble & perform Pooja at night. The Pillai community performs kula deivam pooja on the same day.

== Notable people ==
- Manavasi Ramaswami Iyer, a devotee of Ramana Maharshi
