= Maharishi =

Ancient Indian sage or seer

Maharishi (Sanskrit: महर्षि, lit. 'great seer', IAST: Maharṣi) is a Hindu title used for members of the highest order of ancient enlightened sages, popularly known in India as "seers", i.e., those who engage in research to understand and experience nature, divinity, and the divine context of existence, and these experiences' governing laws.

== Etymology ==
Maharishi is derived from Sanskrit maharṣi. It is formed from mahā, meaning "great", and ṛṣi, meaning "saint" or "seer".

== Description and usage ==
Maharshi may also refer to "seers" or "sages" in India. The term became popular in English literature "sometime before 1890" and was first used in 1758.

Alternate meanings describe Maharshi as a collective name that refers to the seven rishis or saptarishis (including Maharishi Bhrigu) cited in the scriptures of Rig Veda and the Puranas, or any of the several mythological seers that are referenced in Vedic writings and associated with the seven stars of the constellation Ursa Major.

While some suggest that the only ones who can adopt the title are those who achieve the highest state of awareness in the path of evolution and completely understand the working of parabramha, note that unlike Tibetan tulkus, maharishis outside of textual listings are not ordained, conferred nor confirmed by major institutional agency, so that this title is not typically adopted but acclaimed by admirers or critics, whether individuals or organizations including those composed of worshippers or disciples. Similarly, Mohandas Gandhi's prevalent honorific of 'Mahatma', 'Great Soul', is not used in every instance which references him, rather it is accorded by a referrer as a courtesy based on either the referrer's judgment or in acceptance or deference to judgments by some of those familiar with the object individual's case. Furthermore, some also claim that Maharshis are capable of making others become saints as they impart knowledge of the working of the divine, though this is not a dogmatic expectation in each tradition which uses 'Maharshi' as a title.

Sri Aurobindo (1872–1950), usually referred as such as a humble honorific in contrast to individuals whose puissance is emphasized by reduplications such as 'Sri Sri', eschewed personal categorization as a modern Maharishi, however, is frequently accorded it by other pundits and by scholarly and spiritual observers. Because Wikipedia's article on Sri Aurobindo describes him as a Maharishi, sites around the world which use Wikipedia's phrasing repeat this inclusion.

Ramana Maharshi (1879–1950) was an "Indian sage" with a philosophy about the path to self-knowledge and the integration of personality espoused in books by author Paul Brunton and Ramana's own writings such as the Collected Works (1969) and Forty Verses on Reality (1978).

Maharishi Mahesh Yogi (1918–2008) was an Indian guru, known for developing the Transcendental Meditation technique and for his association with the Beatles.

The title was also used by or credited to Valmiki, Patanjali and Dayananda Sarasvati.

Maharshi Nagendranath Bhaduri (1846–1926) was a great spiritual seeker and yogi from Bengal, India. He was also known as Nagendra Nath Bhaduri and "Bhaduri Mahasaya". During his time as Headmaster of Bally English High School, he met Sri Ramakrishna Paramhans at Dakshineswar in 1881. Nagendranath was initially associated with the Adi Brahmo Samaj but later dedicated himself to intense spiritual practices in solitude, particularly in a cave in Monghyr. Paramhansa Nagendranath had a profound connection with Paramahansa Yogananda (then Mukunda) during Yogananda's college days in Calcutta. Bhaduri Mahasaya shared much spiritual knowledge with the young Yogananda and foresaw his future mission, famously advising him:

"Son, go to America. Take the dignity of hoary India for your shield. Victory is written on your brow; the noble distant people will well receive you".

== See also ==
- Maha (disambiguation)
- Maharaj
- Rishi
- Yogi
