= Arthur Osborne (writer) =

English writer (1906–1970)

Arthur Osborne (1906 – May 8, 1970) was an English writer on spirituality and mysticism, and an influential disciple and biographer of Ramana Maharshi, who was the founding editor of Sri Ramana Ashram's quarterly journal The Mountain Path, established in 1964.

== Biography ==
Osborne studied history for two years at Christ Church, Oxford, but left the university dissatisfied with the academic culture.

In 1934 he married Łucja Lipszyc (Lucia, born in Poland on 15 February 1904), when he was in Warsaw teaching English.

In 1936, he set out on a spiritual quest, which eventually brought him to Ramana Maharshi in 1942. From 1964, Osborne served as the founding editor of Mountain Path, a journal published by Ramanasramam, the ashram founded by the devotees of Ramana Maharshi. He also served a editorial staff at Indian Express newspaper at Chennai (then Madras) for some time. He died on 8 May 1970 in Bangalore, aged 63. He was survived by his wife, a son Adam and two daughters, Catherine (Kitty, later Katya Douglas) and Frania. His body was brought to Tiruvannamalai, where Ramana Ashram is located, and was interred at Ramana Nagar.

After Osborne's death in 1970, his wife Lucia (1904-1987) edited the magazine until it was taken over by Swami Viswanathan.

== Works ==
Osborne published several books on Ramana Maharshi, including Ramana Maharshi and the path of self-knowledge, one of the principle publications on Ramana Maharshi. Other publications include a biography of Shirdi Sai Baba. Thirty years after Osborne's death, his autobiography was discovered among his papers and published by Ramanasramam as My Life and Quest.

== Selected bibliography ==
- Osborne, Arthur (1951). Ramana Arunachala; seven essays on Bhagavan Sri Ramana Maharshi. Tiruvannamalai, India: Ramanasramam.
- Osborne, Arthur (1954). Ramana Maharshi and the path of self-knowledge. Foreword by Sarvepalli Radhakrishnan. London: Rider. ISBN 9788172242114.
- Arthur Osborne (1957). The incredible Sai Baba. London: Rider. ISBN 0091109310. OCLC 49522828.
- Arthur Osborne The rhythm of history 1959 Arthur Osborne Indica Varanasi ISBN 978-93-81120-00-2
- Ramana; Arthur Osborne (1959). The collected works of Sri Ramana Maharshi. London: Rider.
- Osborne, Arthur (2001), My Life and Quest (PDF), ISBN 81-88225-20-7

== Sources ==
- Osborne, Arthur (1954), Ramana Maharshi and the path of self-knowledge, London: Rider
- Osborne, Arthur (2001), My Life and Quest (PDF), ISBN 81-88225-20-7
