= Annamalai Swami =

Indian spiritual teacher and disciple of Ramana Maharshi

Annamalai Swami (1906–1995) was an Indian spiritual teacher and disciple of Ramana Maharshi. He visited Sri Ramanasramam in 1928 for the first time and became a close attended to Ramana. He also supervised building constructions work at the ashram.

In 1938 Ramana instructed him to devote himself to meditation, after which he lived in Palakottu, a settlement near Sri Ramanasramam associated with several of Ramana Maharshi's disciples. Beginning in the 1980s, visitors met him for spiritual guidance and discussions of Ramana's teachings.

== Biography ==
Annamalai Swami was born in 1906 in Tondankurichi, present day Tamil Nadu. According to his autobiography, he dropped schooling at a young age and later learnt to read on his own.

In 1928, he received a copy of Upadesa Undiyar, a philosophical poem by Ramama, which contained photograph of Ramana Maharshi, later the same experience that led him to meet with Maharshi.

He died in Tiruvannamalai in 1995.

== Legacy ==
Annamalai's recollections of Maharshi and life at Sri Ramanasramam were recorded and edited by David Godman in Living by the Words of Bhagavan, published in 1994 by the Sri Annamalai Swami Ashram Trust.

== Teachings ==
Annamalai Swami's teachings were based on self-enquiry.

He emphasised self-enquiry and taught that one must examine the origin of thoughts and the sense of personal identity. In his recorded talks, he maintained that the Self alone is ultimately real and liberation comes through remaining established in that awareness rather than through identification with the body, mind or their activities.
