= Manavasi Ramaswami Iyer =

Hindu composer

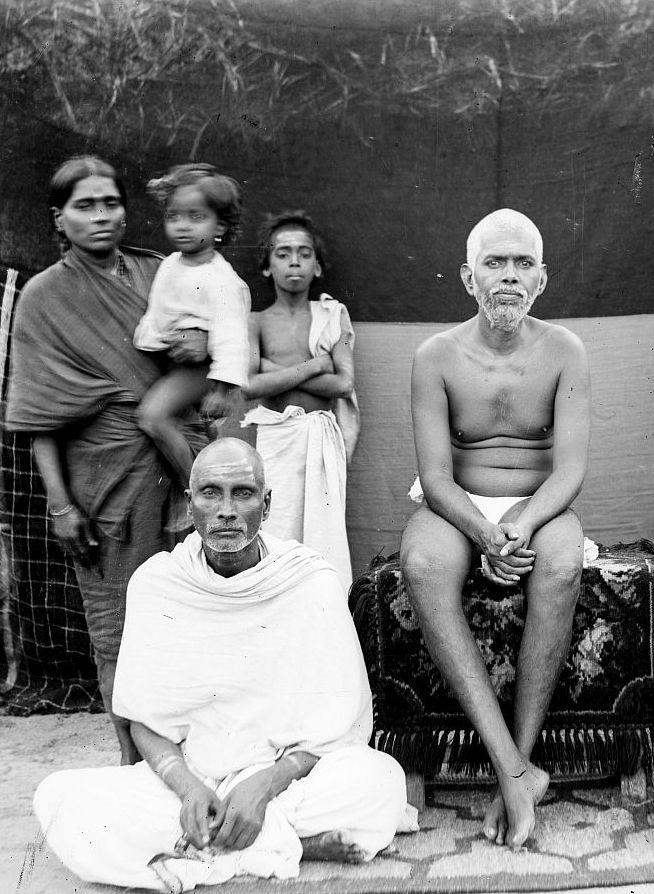
- Manavasi Ramaswami Iyer (left, sitting) with his family and Ramana Maharshi

Personal life
- Born: Before 1879
- Died: After 1950 Chennai, Tamilnadu, India
- Notable work: Saranagati

Religious life
- Religion: Hinduism
- Philosophy: Self-enquiry (Jnana Yoga)

Religious career
- Teacher: Ramana Maharshi

Manavasi Ramaswami Iyer (also known as Saranagati Ramaswami Iyer) was a devotee of Ramana Maharshi. He composed the well-known song Saranagati in his devotion to Ramana Maharshi, which is still sung by devotees of Ramana Maharshi today.

Native to the Manavasi village of Trichy District, Ramaswami Iyer was transferred to a place only 60 kilometres from Tiruvannamalai, Villupuram, where he was the Supervisor of the Public Works Department there. He first went to Tiruvannamalai to meet Ramana Maharshi at the Virupaksha cave in 1907. He was suffering from severe dyspepsia and Ramana Maharshi cured him. Ramaswami Iyer also learned how to compose Tamil kritis from Ramana Maharshi. Ramana Maharshi also saved Ramaswami Iyer from death twice.

Ramaswami Iyer had five daughters and one son. His daughter Rajam was a painter and his daughter Lalitha Venkataraman was a singer.

Ramaswami Iyer planted and watered the massive banyan trees that today exist near the rear part of Ramanashram.

== Saranagati ==
=== Composition ===
Ramaswami Iyer composed his most well-known song, Saranagati (Saraṇāgati or சரணாகதி பாடல்), after coming to the Virupaksha cave to meet Ramana Maharshi after work one day in 1914. He asked Ramana Maharshi in English, "Swami, Jesus Christ, the Buddha and other sages came to the world to redeem the sinners. Is there hope for me?" Ramana Maharshi looked at him and answered, in English, "Yes, there is hope." Inspired by his answer, Ramaswami Iyer composed Saranagati, a song that is popular among many Tamil devotees of Ramana Maharshi to this day.

=== Lyrics ===
| Verse in Tamil | Verse in Roman | English translation |
|---|---|---|
| பல்லவி சரணாகதி உன் பர நான் இனிப் புகத்துணை தான் ஏது நீ புகலாய்: (சரணாகதி); அனுபல்லவி ஸ்மரணாத் கதி பல அருணாசல நிறை ரமணா கருணா வருணா: (சரணாகதி); சரணம் தருணம் இது வன்றோ கருணை நோக்கவே கால ஹரணம் ஆக்கிடில் ஹா ஹா என் செய்வேன் துன்பை நீக்கி இன்பை அளிக்க என் அன்பா இன்னும் பாராமுகம் என்னால் தாளாதய்யா ஸ்ரீ வேதியா: (சரணாகதி) | pallavi saraṇāgati uṉ para nāṉ iṉip pukattuṇai tāṉ ētu nī pukalāy: (saraṇāgati); aṉupallavi smaraṇāt kati pala aruṇācala niṟai ramaṇā karuṇā varuṇā: (saraṇāgati); saraṇam taruṇam itu vaṉṟō karuṇai nōkkavē kāla haraṇam ākkiṭil hā hā eṉ ceyvēṉ tuṉpai nīkki iṉpai aḷikka eṉ aṉpā iṉṉum pārāmukam eṉṉāl tāḷātayyā šrī vētiyā: (saraṇāgati) | pallavi I surrender — unto you Where else am I to surrender myself tell me: (I surrender); anupallavi Who is perfect in Arunachala; Which endows one with ultimate Release; O Ramana, Raincloud of Compassion!: (I surrender); saranam Is this not the appropriate time For granting me your glance of Grace? If you delay, Lo! What am I to do? My beloved, remove my sorrow and grant me Bliss; I can't bear indifference any further, O Vediya (One who is Brahman Itself): (I surrender) |

== Other works ==
Ramaswami Iyer also composed a song called Ariya Taramamo.
