= Advaita Bodha Deepika =

Advaita Vedanta text by Sri Karapatra Swami

Advaita Bodha Deepika, Lamp of Non-Dual Knowledge, is an Advaita Vedanta text written by Sri Karapatra Swami.

== Contents ==
The Advaita Bodha Deepika is set as a dialogue between a master and a student. Just like other medieval Advaita Vedanta texts, samadhi is added to sravana, manana and nididhyasana.

== Appreciation ==
The Advaita Bodha Deepika was highly regarded by Ramana Maharshi.

== Sources ==
- Venkataramaiah, Munagala (2002), Advaita Bodha Deepika or The Lamp of Non-dual Knowledge (PDF), Sri Ramanasramam, archived from the original (PDF) on 18 February 2022
