= David Godman =

English writer (born 1953)

David Godman (born 1953) is an English writer. He has written on the life, teachings and disciples of Ramana Maharshi, an Indian sage who lived and taught for more than fifty years at Arunachala, a sacred mountain in Tamil Nadu, India. In the last 30 years Godman has written or edited 16 books on topics related to Sri Ramana, his teachings and his followers.

== Biography ==
=== Early life ===
David Godman was born in 1953 in Stoke-on-Trent, England. His father was a schoolmaster and mother a physiotherapist who specialised in treating physically handicapped children. He was educated at local schools and in 1972 won a place at Oxford University.

It was sometime in his second year there that he became interested in Ramana Maharshi after reading about his teachings in a book that had been compiled by Arthur Osborne. Godman has said:

It wasn't that I had found a new set of ideas that I believed in. It was more of an experience in which I was pulled into a state of silence. In that silent space I knew directly and intuitively what Ramana's words were hinting and pointing at. Because this state itself was the answer to all my questions, and any other questions I might come up with, the interest in finding solutions anywhere else dropped away. I suppose I must have read the book in an afternoon, but by the time I put it down it had completely transformed the way I viewed myself and the world.

=== Life and work in India ===
Godman first visited the Tiruvannamalai ashram of Ramana Maharshi in 1976. For eight years, between 1978 and 1985, he was the librarian of the ashram. In the 1970s, Godman frequented Nisargadatta Maharaj’s satsangs in Mumbai.

In the early 1980s, Godman started to visit Lakshmana Swamy, a disciple of Ramana Maharshi, in his ashram in Andhra Pradesh. At the instigation of Lakshmana Swamy he wrote No Mind – I am the Self, about the lives and teachings of Lakshmana Swamy and Saradamma, the latter being Lakshmana Swamy's own disciple. When Lakshmana Swamy and Saradamma moved to Tiruvannamalai in the late 1980s, Godman looked after and helped to develop their new property, which was located close to Sri Ramanasramam.

In 1985 his edited anthology of Ramana Maharshi’s teachings, Be As You Are, was published by Penguin.

In 1987 Godman conducted extensive interviews with Annamalai Swami, a devotee of Ramana Maharshi who worked at Sri Ramanasramam between 1928 and 1938. The interviews were the primary source for his book, Living by the Words of Bhagavan, a biography that chronicled Annamalai Swami's relationship with Sri Ramana.

Godman has contributed to a scholarly debate on the true identity of Larry Darrel, a character who appeared in Somerset Maugham’s The Razor’s Edge. Maugham visited Ramanasramam in 1938 and later wrote an essay entitled "The Saint" about his visit. Maugham used the character of Darrel as a follower of a Hindu guru featured in the novel; the guru's physique and teachings were based on those of Ramana Maharshi.

In 1993 Godman moved to Lucknow at the invitation of H. W. L. Poonja, Poonja, a devotee of Ramana Maharshi who subsequently became a well-known spiritual teacher. In his later years Poonja was more generally known as ‘'Papaji’'. Godman made a documentary on Poonja’s life and teachings, edited a collection of interviews that various visitors had with Poonja in the early 1990s, and compiled an authorised three-volume biography entitled Nothing Ever Happened. In 2006, he edited a collection of conversations that had taken place in Poonja’s home in the early 1990s.

After the death of Poonja in 1997, Godman returned to Tiruvannamalai. A year later he edited and published a collection of dialogues that had taken place between Annanalai Swami and visitors to his ashram in the 1980s.

Between 2000 and 2002 Godman brought out The Power of the Presence, a three-volume anthology of mostly first-person accounts that chronicled the experiences that visitors had had with Ramana Maharshi between 1896 and 1950.

Between 2004 and 2008, in collaboration with T. V. Venkatasubramanian and Robert Butler, he translated, edited and published three books of Tamil poetry, composed by the Tamil poet Muruganar, which recorded the teachings of Sri Ramana along with Muruganar’s own experiences.

In 2012, Venkatasubramanian, Butler and Godman translated and published a bilingual (Tamil and English) edition of Sorupa Saram, a Tamil philosophical work composed several hundred years ago by Sorupananda. The three have also collaborated on translations of other Tamil mystic poetry. Among their subjects were Manikkavachakar, Thayumanuvar, and Tattuvaraya.

In 2014, in collaboration with the Whole Life Foundation, Godman filmed a twenty-seven episode, 15-hour series of talks on Ramana Maharshi's life, teachings and followers.

In 2017 Venkatasubramanian and Godman collaborated on The Shining of my Lord, a published anthology of verses composed by Muruganar. These originally appeared in Sri Ramana Jnana Bodham, a nine-volume collection of Muruganar's Tamil verses.

Godman is married to Miri Albahari, a philosophy lecturer who is based in Perth, Australia.

== Works ==
=== Books ===
- Be As You Are (edited): Dialogues between Ramana Maharshi and visitors
- No Mind – I am the Self: Biographies and teachings of Lakshmana Swamy and Mathru Sri Sarada. Lakshmana Swamy is a direct disciple of Ramana Maharshi who claimed to have realised the Self in his presence in 1949. Mathru Sri Sarada is Swamy's disciple and claims to have realised the Self in Swamy's presence in 1978.
- Living by the Words of Bhagavan: A biography of Annamalai Swami, a devotee of Ramana Maharshi who worked closely with the Maharshi in the 1930s and early 1940s. The book also contains dialogues that Annamalai Swami had with visitors in the late 1980s.
- Papaji Interviews (edited): A collection of interviews that various visitors had with Papaji (H. W. L. Poonja) in the early 1990s. The book also contains a lengthy introductory account of Papaji's early life and his association with Ramana Maharshi.
- Nothing Ever Happened: A three-volume biography of H. W. L. Poonja that chronicles his life up to the early 1980s.
- Final Talks (edited): Dialogues between Annamalai Swami and visitors to his ashram that took place in the last six months of his life
- The Power of the Presence (edited): A three-volume series that contains first-person accounts from devotees whose lives were transformed by Maharshi
- Sri Ramana Darsanam (translated and edited): Originally written in Tamil by Sadhu Natanananda, a devotee of Ramana Maharshi, this books gives little-known incidents from Ramana Maharshi's life, along with comments on their significance
- Padamalai (translated and edited): This is derived from a long Tamil poem of the same name that was written by Sri Muruganar, a devotee of Ramana Maharshi. It contains teachings of Ramana Maharshi recorded by Muruganar in Tamil, along with extensive supporting quotations from other sources that contain Ramana Maharshi's teachings.
- Ramana Puranam, composed by Ramana Maharshi and Muruganar, translated and edited by T. V. Venkatasubramanian, Robert Butler and David Godman: This is an annotated translation of a long poem that is the introductory section to Sri Ramana Sannidhi Murai, a collection of devotional poetry by Muruganar.
- The Fire of Freedom (edited): A collection dialogues between Papaji and people who visited his Lucknow home in 1991
- Guru Vachaka Kovai, by Muruganar, translated by T. V. Venkatasubramanian, Robert Butler, and David Godman and edited by David Godman.
- Sorupa Saram by Sorupananda, translated and edited by T. V. Venkatasubramanian, Robert Butler and David Godman, ISBN 978-0-9885285-0-5.
- The Shining of My Lord: Selected Verses from Sri Ramana Jnana Bodham and Other Muruganar Texts, Translated by T.V. Venkatasubramanian and David Godman, Edited by David Godman, ISBN 9780988528543

=== Documentaries ===
- Call off The Search, A documentary that chronicles Poonja’s life, his teachings, and the experiences of devotees who spent time with him in the early 1990s. Distributed by Avadhuta Foundation, Boulder, Colorado.
- Summa Iru, An Interview between Poonja and David Godman in which Poonja lays out some of the key elements of his teachings. Distributed by Avadhuta Foundation, Boulder, Colorado.
- Who Am I?, A documentary made in 2008 and directed by Suniti Kala for Hooper Productions. It was broadcast on SABC (South African Broadcast Corporation) in their ‘Issues of Faith’ series in 2008. The documentary features the teachings of Ramana Maharshi, Poonja and Nisargadatta Maharaj while simultaneously covering David Godman’s relationship with all three teachers.This documentary received a Special Jury Award winner at the Bali International Film Festival in November 2009.
- Talks on Sri Ramana Maharshi: Narrated by David Godman,
