= Ethel Merston =

Ethel Merston (23 December 1882, in London – 19 March 1967, in Tiruvannamalai, India) was one of G. I. Gurdjieff’s first students at his Institute for the Harmonious Development of Man, at the Prieuré in Fontainebleau-en-Avon, France. Gurdjieff had recently come to the West to introduce an esoteric teaching called the Fourth Way. She wrote a memoir based on her diaries, giving a keen insight into many of the seminal teachers of her times.

== Biography ==
Ethel Merston first met Gurdjieff in London, through P. D. Ouspensky and Dr. Maurice Nicoll (1884-1953), and went to France where she lived and studied with Gurdjieff at the Prieuré from 1922 to 1927. An energetic worker with organizational and administrative abilities, she managed the school in Mr. Gurdjieff’s absences. For some years, as Gurdjieff wrote his magnum opus All and Everything, she was one of the principal translators. Though she left the Institute in 1927, Gurdjieff remained an important influence in her life.

Financially independent, she traveled the world, settling in India in 1934. She chanced to meet again a childhood friend, Maud MacCarthy (later known as Swami Omananda), who arrived with her husband, the composer John Foulds, and their friend Bill, known as The Boy. She befriended many Western seekers, among them Alain Daniélou and his companion Raymond Burnier, and worked with Daniélou on his book, Introduction to the Study of Musical Scales. She introduced her young Scots friend, Alexander Phipps (later known as Sri Madhava Ashish) to Sri Krishna Prem, who had co-founded the Mirtola ashram with his guru Sri Yashoda Mai (1882-1944). The French Benedictine monk Père Henri Le Saux (Swami Abhishiktananda) became a lifelong friend, grateful for Ethel’s invaluable help at key moments in his quest. She was a friend of Sunyata, whom Ramana Maharshi had said was a “rare born mystic.”

She met and worked with J. Krishnamurti, Anandamayi Ma, Sri Aurobindo and The Mother, among others. The great sage Ramana Maharshi was the one she chose as her lifelong guru. She first met him while living in a rural village near Benares where for seven years she managed a farm and became a trusted member of the community through her mediation skills, leadership ability and tremendous energy. She left the village for Ramana Maharshi’s ashram, and was with him until his death in 1950. In her memoirs she gave a first person account of his death, and also the meeting between The Mother and Anandamayi Ma, with whom she traveled for some time.

Though making India and Ramanasramam her permanent home, she returned to England periodically in the 1950s, living at the Coombe Springs Institute, founded by J. G. Bennett, a former student of Gurdjieff. While there she worked on Bennett’s Dramatic Universe and was initiated into Subud by Pak Subuh. On her last trip around the world she stayed in New York, in 1959, where she reconnected with old friends from the Prieuré - Mme Jeanne de Salzmann, Madame Ouspensky (Sophie Grigorievna Ouspensky) (née Volochine) (November 8, 1878 - December 30, 1961), Olga Arkadievna de Hartmann (née de Schumacher) (1885-1979), and Margaret "Peggy" Flinsch (née Matthews) (1907-2011) — and was introduced to Lord John Pentland (Henry Sinclair, 2nd Baron Pentland) (1907-1984).

Returning in 1959 to Ramanasramam, she built a house and lived there until her death in March 1967.

A spiritual biography of Ethel Merston was released in 2009, A Woman’s Work with Gurdjieff, Ramana Maharshi, Krishnamurti, Anandamayi Ma & Pak Subuh, by Mary Ellen Korman with a Foreword by William Patrick Patterson.
