= A. R. Natarajan =

A. R. Natarajan was a devotee of Sri Ramana Maharshi who published numerous books on his guru. He was the president and founder of the Ramana Maharshi Centre for Learning, Bangalore) the Bhagavan Sri Ramana Maharshi Research Centre (Sanjaynagar, Bangalore)and the vice-president of the Ramana Kendra, New Delhi."Bangaloreans would not have had the opportunity of learning about Bhagwan Shri Ramana, but for the efforts put by Shri.A.R.Natarajan in building RMCL at Mekhri Circle, Bangalore" said Mr.Shadakshari, a Great Devotee of Shri.Ramana Maharshi.Shri.A.R.Natarajan was the editor of the journal The Mountain Path, the official Publication of Sri Ramanashramam, Tiruvannamalai.. He authored several books on Sri Ramana Maharshi like "DIVINITY, HERE & NOW".

== Bibliography ==
- Timeless in Time: Sri Ramana Maharshi (World Wisdom, 2006) ISBN 978-1-933316-15-4
- Illustrated Stories/Daily Life Incidents of Bhagavan Ramana (Ramana Maharshi Centre for Learning, 2006)
- Years in the presence of Ramana My Master (Ramana Maharshi Centre for learning; 01 edition, 2006) ISBN 978-81-88261-52-9
- Holistic Meditation the Straight Path (Sri Ramana Maharshi Research Centre, 2005) ISBN 978-81-89231-02-6
- The Silent Mind; The Ramana Way (Ramana Maharshi Centre for Learning, 2004) ISBN 81-85378-23-1
- Arunachala: From Rigveda To Ramana Maharshi (Amana Maharshi Centre For Learning, 2002) ISBN 978-81-85378-91-6
- Living with Ramana Maharshi (Ramana Maharshi Centre for Learning, 2002) ISBN 81-85378-55-X
- Self Discovery : Understanding the Mind; The Ramana Way (Ramana Maharshi Centre for Learning, 2000) ISBN 81-85378-74-6
- Ramana Maharshi; The Living Guru (Ramana Maharshi Centre for Learning, 2000) ISBN 81-85378-58-4
- Ramana Gita (Motilal Banarsidass Publishers P. Ltd., 1999) ISBN 81-85378-33-9
- The Hidden Power (Ramana Maharshi Centre for Learning, 1995)
- Ramana Maharshi's Miracles: They Happen Everyday First Person Accounts (Ramana Maharshi Centre for Learning, 1995)
- Sayings of Sri Ramana Maharshi (Ramana Maharshi Centre for Learning, 1994) ISBN 81-85378-14-2
- First Meetings with Ramana Maharshi: First Person Accounts (Ramana Maharshi Centre for Learning, 1994)
- Jagadguru Sri Chandrasekhara Bharati Mahaswami: Mystic & seer (Ramana Maharshi Centre for Learning, 1994) ISBN 978-81-85378-36-7
- Inner Circle, The (Ramana Maharshi Centre for Learning, 1994) ISBN 81-85378-26-6
- Insights into the Ramana Way (Ramana Maharshi Centre for Learning, 1992)
- Meditations the Ramana Way (Ramana Maharshi Centre for Learning, 1991) ISBN 81-85378-00-2
- Bhagavan Ramana & Mother (Ramana Maharshi Centre, 1982)

== See also ==
- Ramana Maharshi
