= Ramana Maharshi =

Indian Hindu sage (1879–1950)

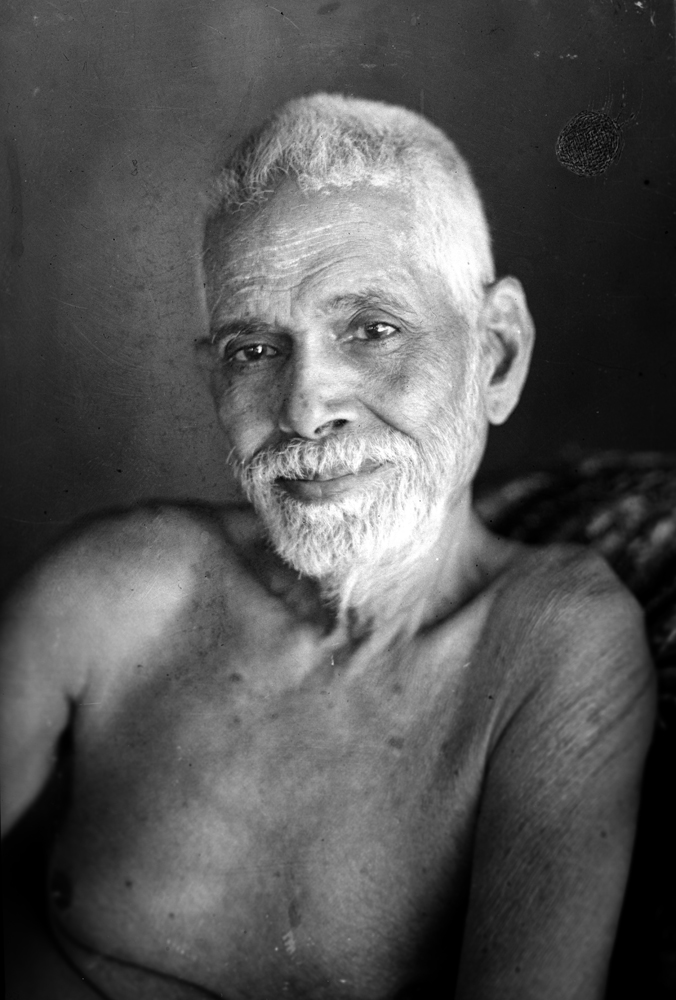
- Ramana Maharshi in his late 60s

Personal life
- Born: Venkataraman Iyer; 30 December 1879 Tiruchuzhi, Virudhunagar, Madras Presidency, British India (Now Tamil Nadu, India)
- Died: 14 April 1950 (aged 70) Sri Ramana Ashram, Tiruvannamalai, Tamil Nadu, India
- Notable work(s): Nān Yār? ("Who am I?"); Five Hymns to Arunachala

Religious life
- Religion: Hinduism
- Philosophy: Self-enquiry (Jnana Yoga)

Religious career
- Teacher: Arunachala

Quotation

Of all the thoughts that rise in the mind, the thought 'I' is the first thought.

Ramana Maharshi (pronounced [ˈɾɐ.mɐ.ɳɐ mɐˈɦɐɾ.ʂi]; 30 December 1879 – 14 April 1950) was an Indian Hindu sage widely regarded by his followers and by "most advocates of Advaita" as a jivanmukta (liberated being). He was born Venkataraman Iyer, but is mostly known by the name Bhagavan Sri Ramana Maharshi. (Note: Bhagavan means God, Sri is an honorific title, Ramana is a short form of Venkataraman, and Maharshi means 'great seer' in Sanskrit. The name was given to him in 1907 by one of his first devotees, Ganapati Muni.)

He was born in Tiruchuli, Tamil Nadu, India in 1879. In 1895, an attraction to the sacred hill Arunachala and the 63 Nayanmars was aroused in him, and in 1896, at the age of 16, he had a "death-experience" in which he became aware of a "current" or "force" (avesam) which he recognised as his true "I" or "self", (Note: David godman (7 May 2008), Bhagavan's death experience, The Mountain Path, 1981, pp. 67–69.) and which he later identified with "the personal God, or Iswara", (Note: According to G.K. Pillai, this death-experience was an epileptic seizure, which may have been self-induced by holding the breath. Sudden fear, sensations of heat, the awareness of a presence, and body rigidity, are all symptoms that may manifest either prior or during a seizure: * "A sudden sense of unprovoked fear" (Note: Mayo Clinic) * "A rising sensation in the abdomen" * "Some patients have troubles finding appropriate words, or give very simplified descriptions (e.g. feeling of warmth rising in the body, "rising in the head, like bubbles in the head"" * "Patients in the HYG more often reported actual experiences of some external being and an awareness of that being. This was described as either an evil or a great spiritual presence, and was associated with feelings of death and dying and an overwhelming feeling of fear. Such phenomenology is akin to the verbal reports from many patients with postictal psychoses. There is not just an awareness of the presence, but also an identification of this other essence. There is also the contrast between, on one hand, almost ecstasy (a miraculous event) and the experience of the presence of a great figure and, on the other hand, the more ominous feelings of fear, death, and punishment." * "In a tonic seizure, the body, arms, or legs may be suddenly stiff or tense." His experience, and the subsequent sudden and dramatic interest fits in with the Geschwind syndrome, a "transformation of the personality brought about by TLE, in that for some it seemed to magnify or give rise to a preoccupation with religious or philosophical matters.") that is, Shiva. This resulted in a state that he later described as "the state of mind of Iswara or the jnani". (Note: Heinrich Zimmer uses the term "the intuition of the enlightened". Ramana Maharshi, as cited by Zimmer: "When I later in Tiruvannamalai listened, how the Ribhu Gita and such sacred texts were read, I caught these things and discovered that these books named and analysed, what I before involuntarily felt, without being able to appoint or analyse. In the language of these books I could denote the state in which I found myself after my awakening as 'cleaned understanding' (shuddham manas) or "Insight" (Vijñāna): as 'the intuition of the Enlightened'".) Six weeks later he left his uncle's home in Madurai, and journeyed to the holy mountain Arunachala, in Tiruvannamalai, where he took on the role of a sannyasin (though not formally initiated), and remained for the rest of his life.

He attracted devotees who regarded him as an avatar of Shiva and came to him for darshan ("the sight of God"). In later years, an ashram grew up around him, where visitors received upadesa ("spiritual instruction") by sitting silently in his company or by asking questions. Since the 1930s his teachings have been popularised in the West.

Ramana Maharshi approved a number of paths and practices, but recommended self-enquiry as the principal means to remove ignorance and abide in self-awareness, (Note: David Godman, The unity of surrender and Self-enquiry) together with bhakti (devotion) or surrender to the Self.

== Biography ==
=== Early years (1879–1895) ===
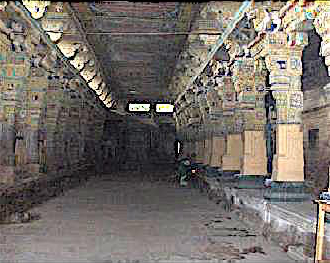
Temple of Tiruchushi, Tamil Nadu

Ramana Maharshi was born Venkataraman Iyer on 30 December 1879 in the village Tiruchuzhi near Aruppukkottai, Virudhunagar District in Tamil Nadu, India. He was the second of four children in an orthodox Hindu Brahmin family. His father was Sundaram Iyer (1848–1890), from the lineage of Parashara, and his mother was Azhagammal (1864–1922). He had two brothers Nagaswami (1877–1900) and Nagasundaram (1886–1953), along with a younger sister Alamelu (1887–1953). His father was a court pleader.

Both a paternal uncle of his father and his father's brother had become sannyasins. Venkataraman's family belonged to the Smarta denomination, and regularly worshiped Shiva, Vishnu, Ganesha, Surya and Shakti in their home.

When Venkataraman was seven he had his upanayana, the traditional initiation of the three upper varnas into Brahmanical learning and the knowledge of Self. He had a very good memory, and was able to recall information after hearing it once, an ability he used to memorise Tamil poems.

Narasimha notes that Venkataraman used to sleep very deeply, not waking from loud sounds, nor even when his body was beaten by others. When he was about twelve years old, he may have experienced spontaneous deep meditative states. Sri Ramana Vijayam, the Tamil biography that first appeared in the 1920s, describes a period a few years before the death-experience in Madurai:

Some incomplete practice from a past birth was clinging to me. I would be putting attention solely within, forgetting the body. Sometimes I would be sitting in one place, but when I regained normal consciousness and got up, I would notice that I was lying down in a different narrow space [to the one where I had first sat down]. (Note: The phrase "incomplete practice from a past birth clinging to me" includes the Tamil term vittakurai which the Tamil Lexicon defines as "Karma resulting from acts performed in a previous birth, and which are considered to be the cause of progress in the current birth". The implication is that some spiritual practice performed in a previous life carried forward and drew the young Venkararaman into states of absorption in which he was unaware of either his body or his surroundings.)

When he was about eleven his father sent him to live with his paternal uncle Subbaiyar in Dindigul as he wanted his sons to be educated in the English language, so that they would be eligible to enter government service. Only Tamil was taught at the village school in Tiruchuzhi, which he attended for three years. In 1891, when his uncle was transferred to Madurai, Venkataraman and his elder brother Nagaswami moved with him. In Dindigul, Venkataraman attended a Hindu School where English was taught, and stayed there for a year.

His father, Sundaram Iyer, died suddenly on 18 February 1892. After his father's death, the family split up; Venkataraman and Nagaswami stayed with Subbaiyar in Madurai.

=== Adolescence and realisation (1895–1896) ===
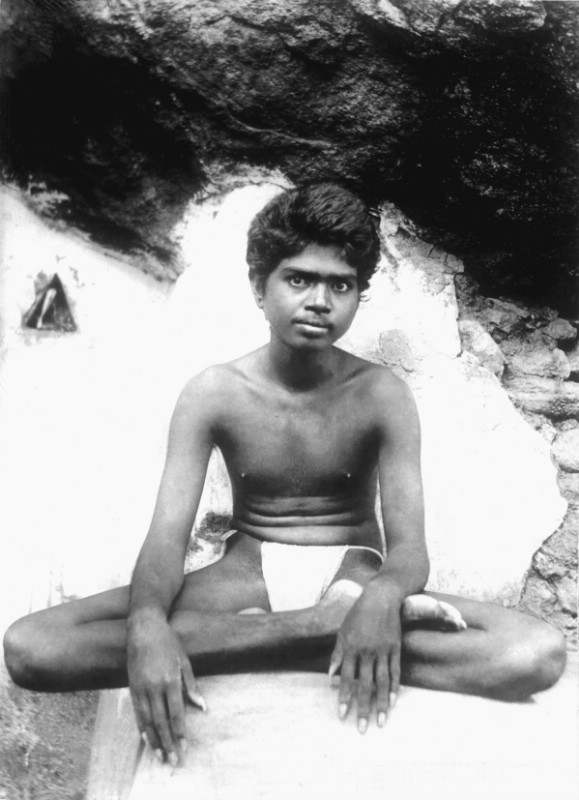
Venkataraman at 21 or 22 years old

Venkataraman first attended Scott's Middle School and then the American Mission High School where he became acquainted with Christianity.

In November 1895 Venkataraman realised that Arunachala, the sacred mountain, was a real place. He had known of its existence from an early age, and was overwhelmed by the realisation that it really existed. During this time he also read Sekkizhar's Periyapuranam, a book that describes the lives of the 63 Nayanmars, which "made a great impression" on him, (Note: David Godman (23 June 2008), More on Bhagavan's death experience) and revealed to him that "Divine Union" is possible. According to Osborne, a new current of awareness started to awaken during his visits to the Meenakshi Temple at Madurai, "a state of blissful consciousness transcending both the physical and mental plane and yet compatible with full use of the physical and mental faculties". But Ramana Maharshi later stated that he remained uninterested in religion or spirituality until his awakening eight months later.

According to Narasimha, in July 1896, (Note: According to David Godman, the date 17 July 1896 is based on astrology. Whether Venkataraman's awakening truly occurred on 17 July 1896, or a date close to the 17th is unknown. However, it is known that Venkataraman's awakening did take place at some point in the middle of July 1896.) at age 16, he had a sudden fear of death. He was struck by "a flash of excitement" or "heat", like some avesam, a "current" or "force" that seemed to possess him, while his body became rigid. A process of self-enquiry was initiated, asking himself, "what it is that dies?" He concluded the body dies, but this "current" or "force" remains alive, and recognised this "current" or "force" as his Self, which he later identified with "the personal God, or Iswara". (Note: In an interview with Narasimha, Ramana Maharshi stated: "Once I reached that conclusion (as I said, on the first day of the six weeks, the day of my awakening into my new life) the fear of death dropped off. It had no place in my thoughts. 'I', being a subtle current, it had no death to fear. So, further development or activity was issuing from the new life and not from any fear. I had no idea at that time of the identity of that current with the personal God, or Iswara as I used to call him. As for Brahman, the impersonal absolute, I had no idea then. I had not even heard the name then. I had not read the Bhagavad Gita or any other religious works except the Periyapuranam and in Bible class the four Gospels and the Psalms from the Bible. I had seen a copy of Vivekananda's Chicago lecture, but I had not read it. I could not even pronounce his name correctly. I pronounced it 'Vyvekananda', giving the 'i' the 'y' sound. I had no notions of religious philosophy except the current notions of God, that He is an infinitely powerful person, present everywhere, though worshipped in special places in the images representing Him. This I knew in addition to a few other similar ideas which I picked up from the Bible and the Periyapuranam. Later, when I was in the Arunachala Temple, I learned of the identity of myself with Brahman, which I had heard in the Ribhu Gita as underlying all. I was only feeling that everything was being done by the current and not by me, a feeling I had had ever since I wrote my parting note and left home. I had ceased to regard the current as my narrow 'I'. This current, or avesam, now felt as if it was my Self, not a superimposition. While, on the one hand, the awakening gave me a continuous idea or feeling that my Self was a current or force in which I was perpetually absorbed whatever I did, on the other hand the possession led me frequently to the Meenakshi Sundaresa Temple [in Madurai]. Formerly I would visit it occasionally with friends, but at that time [it] produced no noticeable emotional effect, much less a change in my habits. But after the awakening I would go there almost every evening, and in that obsession I would go and stand there for a long time alone before Siva, Nataraja, Meenakshi and the sixty-three saints. I would sob and shed tears, and would tremble with emotion. I would not generally pray for anything in particular, although I often wished and prayed that…")

In one of his rare written comments on this process Ramana Maharshi wrote, "inquiring within Who is the seer? I saw the seer disappear leaving That alone which stands forever. No thought arose to say I saw. How then could the thought arise to say I did not see." (Note: An Introduction to Sri Ramana Maharshi's Life and Teachings. David Godman talks to John David)

Later in life, he called his death experience akrama mukti, "sudden liberation", as opposed to the krama mukti, "gradual liberation" as in the Vedanta path of jnana yoga. (Note: Rama P. Coomaraswamy: "[Krama-mukti is] to be distinguished from jîvan-mukti, the state of total and immediate liberation attained during this lifetime, and videha-mukti, the state of total liberation attained at the moment of death." See (Note: Swami Krishnananda, The Attainment of Liberation: Progressive Salvation) for more info on "gradual liberation".) It resulted in a state of mind which he later described as "the state of mind of Iswara or the jnani:"

After reading the language of the sacred books, I see it may be termed suddha manas [pure mind], akhandakara vritti [unbroken experience], prajna [true knowledge] etc.; that is, the state of mind of Iswara or the jnani."

After this event, he lost interest in school studies, friends, and relations. He was absent-minded at school, "imagining and expecting God would suddenly drop down from Heaven before me". Avoiding company, he preferred to sit alone, absorbed in concentration on this current or force, and went daily to the Meenakshi Temple, ecstatically devoted to the images of the 63 Nayanmars and of Nataraja, wanting "the same grace as was shown to those saints", praying that he "should have the same bhakti that they had" and "[weeping] that God should give me the same grace He gave to those saints". (Note: Sudden conversion, following after epipletic seizures, is also described in the Geschwind syndrome: "... the transformation of the personality brought about by TLE, in that for some it seemed to magnify or give rise to a preoccupation with religious or philosophical matters".)

Knowing his family would not permit him to become a sanyassin and leave home, Venkataraman slipped away, telling his brother he needed to attend a special class at school. Venkataraman boarded the train on 29 August 1896 and reached Tiruvannamalai on 1 September 1896 where he remained for the rest of his life.

=== Tiruvannamalai temples (1896–1899) ===
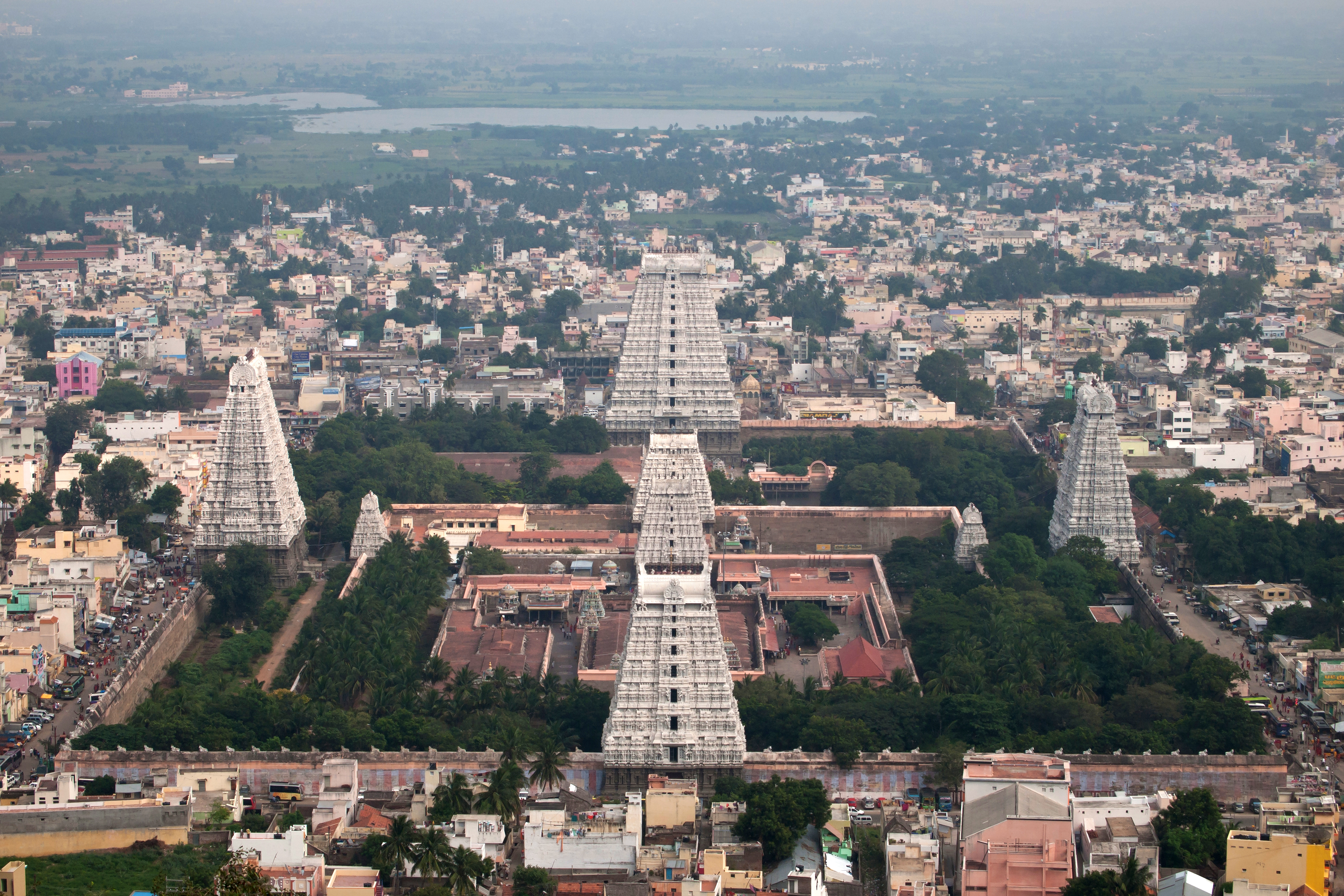
Arunachaleswara Temple, Tiruvannamalai

==== Arunachaleswara temple (1896–1897) ====
When Maharshi arrived in Tiruvannamalai, he went to the temple of Arunachaleswara. He spent the first few weeks in the thousand-pillared hall, then shifted to other spots in the temple, and eventually to the Patala-lingam vault so that he could remain undisturbed. There, he spent days absorbed in such deep samādhi that he was unaware of the bites of vermin and pests. Seshadri Swamigal, a local saint, discovered him in the underground vault and tried to protect him. After about six weeks in the Patala-lingam vault, he was carried out and cleaned up. For the next two months he stayed in the Subramanya Shrine, so unaware of his body and surroundings that food had to be placed in his mouth to keep him from starving.

==== Gurumurtam temple (1897–1898) ====
In February 1897, six months after his arrival at Tiruvannamalai, Ramana Maharshi moved to Gurumurtam, a temple about a mile away. Shortly after his arrival a sadhu named Palaniswami went to see him. Palaniswami's first darshan left him filled with peace and bliss, and from that time on, he served Ramana Maharshi as his permanent attendant. Besides physical protection, Palaniswami would also beg for alms, cook and prepare meals for himself and Ramana Maharshi, and care for him as needed. In May 1898 Ramana Maharshi moved to a mango orchard next to Gurumurtam.

Osborne wrote that during this time Ramana Maharshi completely neglected his body. He also ignored the ants which bit him incessantly. Gradually, despite Ramana Maharshi's desire for privacy, he attracted attention from visitors who admired his silence and austerities, bringing offerings and singing praises. Eventually a bamboo fence was built to protect him.

While living at the Gurumurtam temple his family discovered his whereabouts. First, his uncle Nelliappa Iyer came and pleaded with him to return home, promising that the family would not disturb his ascetic life. Ramana Maharshi sat motionless, and eventually his uncle gave up.

In September 1898 Ramana Maharshi moved to the Shiva-temple at Pavalakkunru, one of the eastern spurs of Arunachala. He refused to return even though his mother begged him to.

=== Arunachala (1899–1922) ===
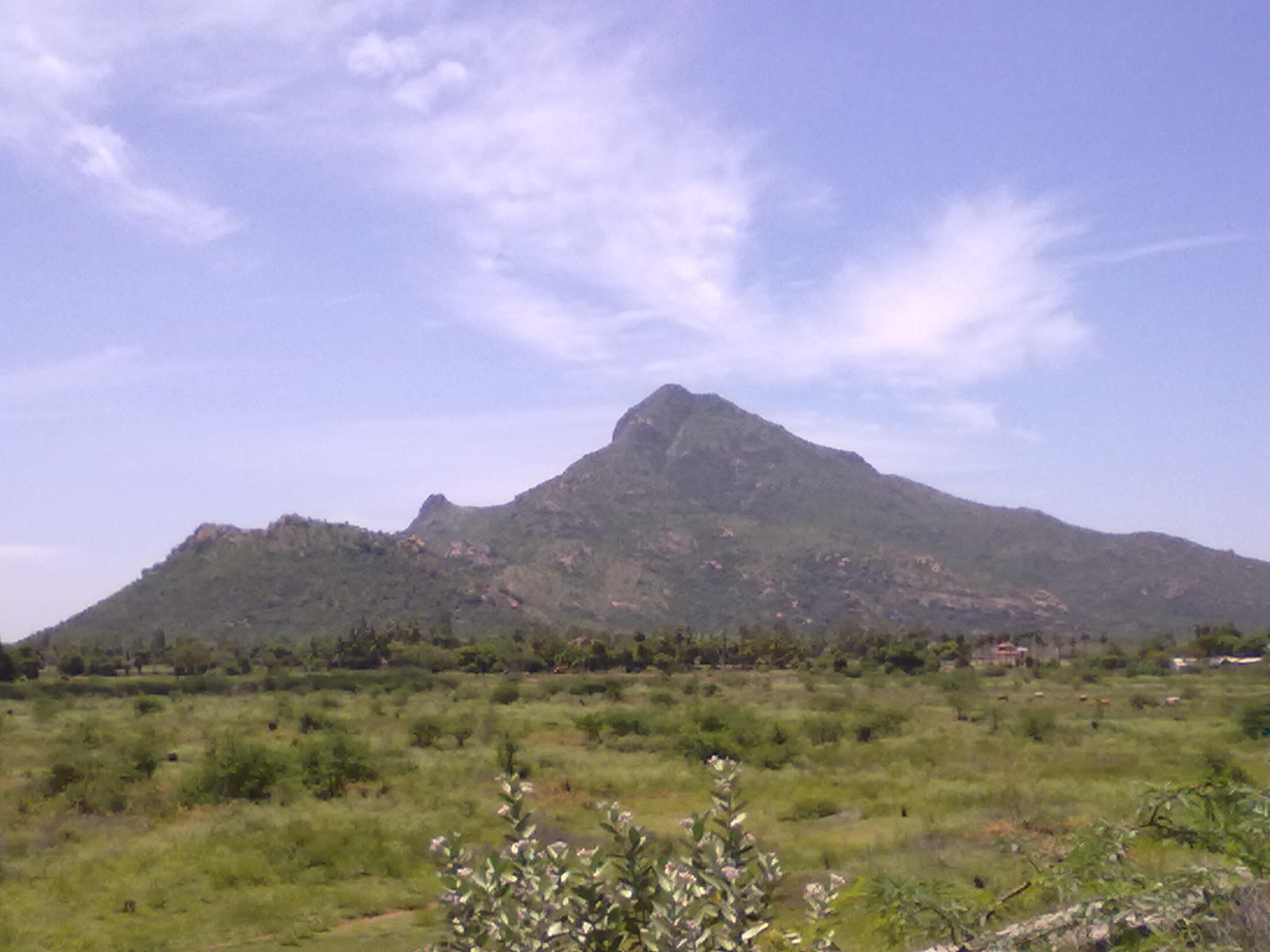
Arunachala Hill, Tiruvannamalai

Soon after this, in February 1899, Ramana Maharshi left the foothills to live in Arunachala. He stayed briefly in Satguru Cave and Guhu Namasivaya Cave before taking up residence at Virupaksha Cave for the next 17 years, using Mango Tree cave during the summers, except for a six-month period at Pachaiamman Koil during the plague epidemic.

In 1902, a government official named Sivaprakasam Pillai, with writing slate in hand, visited the young Swami in the hope of obtaining answers to questions about "How to know one's true identity". The fourteen questions he asked the young Swami and his answers formed Ramana Maharshi's first teachings on Self-enquiry, the method for which he became widely known, and were eventually published as Nan Yar?, or in English, Who am I?.

Many visitors came to him and some became his devotees. Kavyakantha Sri Ganapati Sastri, (Note: Literally, "One who has poetry in his throat.") a Vedic scholar of repute in his age, with a deep knowledge of the Srutis, Sastras, Tantras, Yoga, and Agama systems, but lacking the personal darshan of Shiva, came to visit Ramana Maharshi in 1907. After receiving upadesa from him on self-enquiry, he proclaimed him as Bhagavan Sri Ramana Maharshi. Ramana Maharshi was known by this name from then on. Ganapati Sastri passed on these instructions to his own students, but later in life confessed that he had never been able to achieve permanent Self-abidance. Nevertheless, he was highly valued by Ramana Maharshi and played an important role in his life.

In 1911, the first westerner, Frank Humphreys, then a police officer stationed in India, discovered Ramana Maharshi and wrote articles about him, which were first published in The International Psychic Gazette in 1913. (Note: See Frank H. Humphreys, Glimpses of the Life and Teachings of Bhagavan Sri Ramana Maharshi for Humphreys writings on Ramana Maharshi.)

In an appendix to Self realisation, Narasimha wrote that in 1912, while in the company of disciples, Ramana Maharshi had an epileptic seizure, in which his vision was suddenly impaired three times by a "white bright curtain" which covered a part of his vision. On the third instance, his vision was completely shut out, while his "head was swimming", and he felt his heart stop beating and his breathing seize. His skin turned blue, as if he was dead. This lasted for about ten or fifteen minutes, after which "a shock passed suddenly through the body", and his blood circulation and his respiration returned. In response to "strange accounts" about this event, Ramana Maharshi later explained that it was a seizure, which he used to have occasionally, and that he did not bring it on himself. According to Osborne, it "marked the final completion of Sri Bhagavan's return to full outer normality".

In 1916, his mother Alagammal and younger brother Nagasundaram joined Ramana Maharshi at Tiruvannamalai and followed him when he moved to the larger Skandashram Cave, where Bhagavan lived until the end of 1922. His mother took up the life of a sannyasin and Ramana Maharshi began to give her intense, personal instruction, while she took charge of the Ashram kitchen. Ramana Maharshi's younger brother, Nagasundaram, also became a sannyasi, assuming the name Niranjanananda and becoming known as Chinnaswami (the younger Swami).

During this period, Ramana Maharshi composed The Five Hymns to Arunachala, his magnum opus in devotional lyric poetry. The first hymn is Akshara Mana Malai. (Note: Marital Garland of Letters) It was composed in Tamil in response to the request of a devotee for a song to be sung while wandering in the town for alms. The Akshara Mana Malai (Marital Garland of Letters) tells, in glowing symbolism, of the love and union between the human soul and God, expressing the attitude of the soul that still aspires.

Starting in 1920, his mother's health deteriorated. She died on 19 May 1922 while Ramana Maharshi sat beside her.

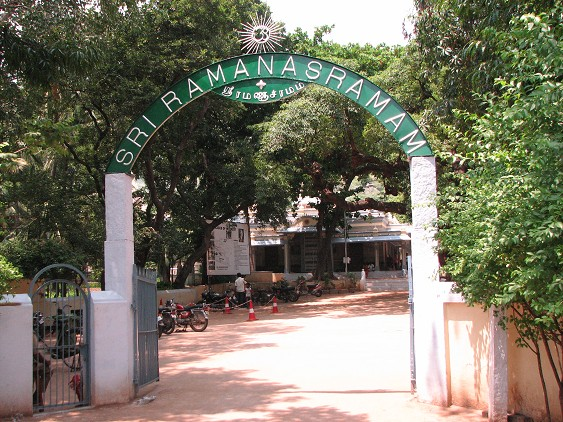
The Entrance of Sri Ramanasramam.

=== Sri Ramanasramam (1922–1950) ===
==== Commencement of Ramanasramam (1922–1930) ====
From 1922 until his death in 1950, Ramana Maharshi lived in Sri Ramanasramam, the ashram that developed around his mother's tomb. Ramana Maharshi often walked from Skandashram to his mother's tomb. In December 1922, he did not return to Skandashram, and settled at the base of the Hill, and Sri Ramanasramam started to develop. At first, there was only one hut at the samadhi, but in 1924 two huts were erected – one opposite the samadhi and the other to the north. The so-called Old Hall was built in 1928, where Ramana Maharshi lived until 1949.

Sri Ramanasramam grew to include a library, hospital, post office, and many other facilities. Ramana Maharshi displayed a natural talent for planning and building projects. Annamalai Swami gave detailed accounts of this in his reminiscences. Until 1938, Annamalai Swami was entrusted with the task of supervising the projects and received his instructions directly from Ramana Maharshi.

Ramana Maharshi led a modest and renunciate life. However, according to David Godman, who has written extensively about Ramana Maharshi, the popular image of him as a person who spent most of his time doing nothing except sitting silently in samadhi is highly inaccurate. From the period when an Ashram began to rise around him after his mother arrived, until his later years when his health failed, Ramana Maharshi was actually quite active in Ashram activities such as cooking and stitching leaf plates. (Note: An Introduction to Sri Ramana Maharshi's Life and Teachings. David Godman talks to John David. Page 3)

==== Discovery by westerners (1930–1940) ====
In 1931 a biography of Ramana Maharshi, Self Realisation: The Life and Teachings of Ramana Maharshi, written by B. V. Narasimha, was published. Ramana Maharshi then became relatively well known in and out of India after 1934 when Paul Brunton, having first visited Ramana Maharshi in January 1931, published the book A Search in Secret India. In this book he describes how he was compelled by the Paramacharya of Kanchi to meet Ramana Maharshi, his meeting with Ramana Maharshi, and the effect this meeting had on him. Brunton also describes how Ramana Maharshi's fame had spread, "so that pilgrims to the temple were often induced to go up the hill and see him before they returned home". Brunton calls Ramana Maharshi "one of the last of India's spiritual supermen", and describes his affection toward Ramana Maharshi:

I like him greatly because he is so simple and modest, when an atmosphere of authentic greatness lies so palpably around him; because he makes no claims to occult powers and hierophantic knowledge to impress the mystery loving nature of his countrymen; and because he is so totally without any traces of pretension that he strongly resists every effort to canonize him during his lifetime.

While staying at Sri Ramanasramam, Brunton had an experience of a "sublimely all-embracing" awareness, a "Moment of Illumination". The book was a best-seller and introduced Ramana Maharshi to a wider audience in the west. Resulting visitors included Paramahansa Yogananda, Somerset Maugham (whose 1944 novel The Razor's Edge models its spiritual guru after Ramana Maharshi), (Note: David Godman (1988), Somerset Maugham and The Razor's Edge, The Mountain Path, 1988, pp. 239–45) Mercedes de Acosta and Arthur Osborne, the last of whom was the first editor of Mountain Path in 1964, the magazine published by Ramanasramam.

==== Final years (1940–1950) ====
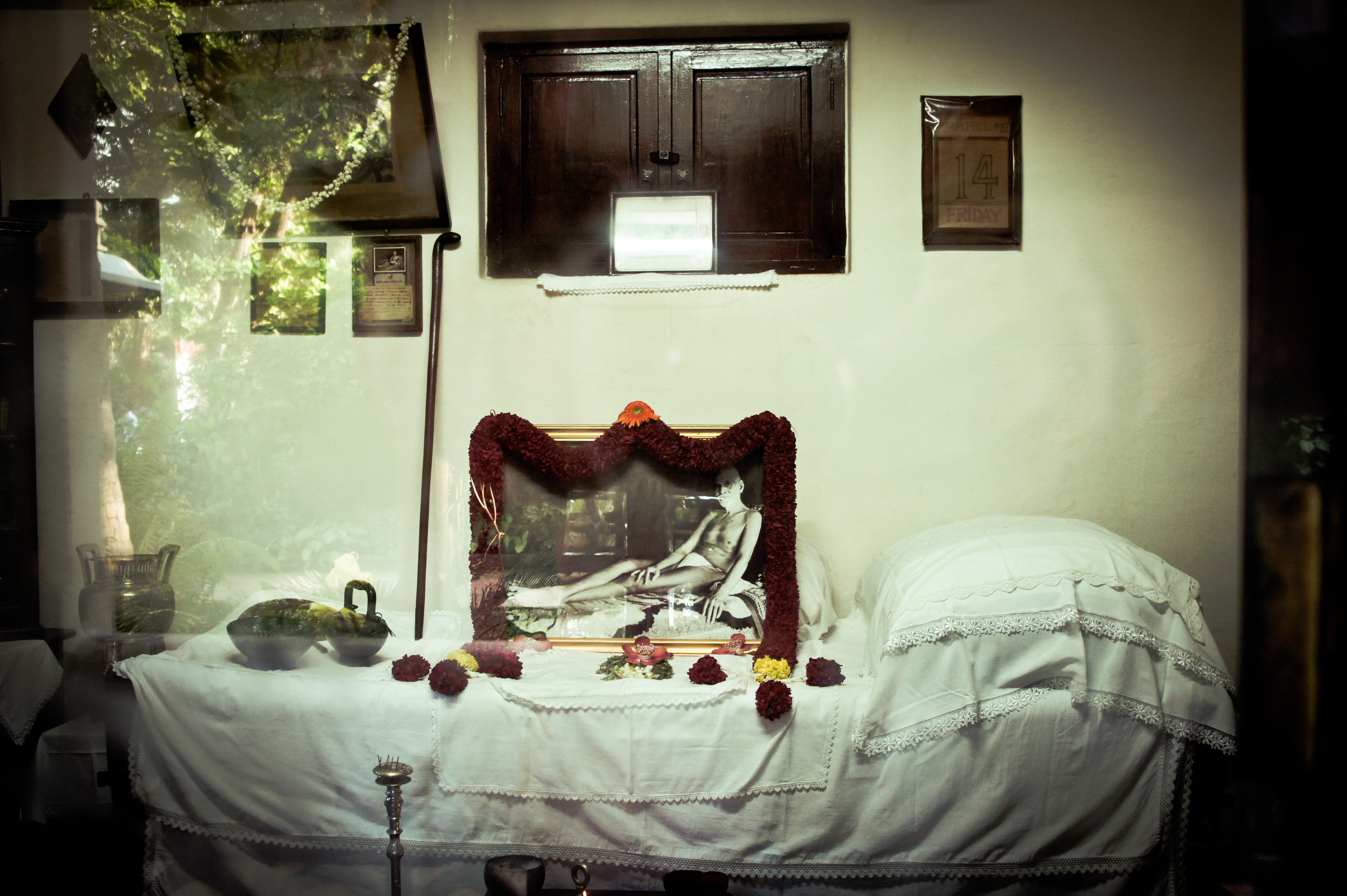
Sri Ramana Maharshi's deathbed in Ramanasramam

In November 1948, a tiny cancerous lump was found on Ramana Maharshi's arm and was removed in February 1949 by the ashram's doctor. Soon, another growth appeared, and an eminent surgeon performed another operation in March 1949 with radium applied. The doctor told Ramana Maharshi that a complete amputation of the arm to the shoulder was required to save his life, but he refused. Third and fourth operations were performed in August and December 1949, but only weakened him. Other systems of medicine were then tried; all proved fruitless and were stopped by the end of March when devotees gave up all hope. To devotees who begged him to cure himself for the sake of his followers, Ramana Maharshi is said to have replied, "Why are you so attached to this body? Let it go", and "Where can I go? I am here." By April 1950, Ramana Maharshi was too weak to go to the hall and visiting hours were limited. Visitors would file past the small room where he spent his last days to get one final glimpse. He died on 14 April 1950 at 8:47 p.m. (Note: Reminiscences-II -Swami Satyananda (Surpassing Love And Grace) "Arunachala's Ramana Maharshi, Boundless Ocean of Grace, Volume 6." Sri Ramanasramam, Tiruvannamalai) At the same time a shooting star was seen, which impressed some of his devotees as a synchronicity.

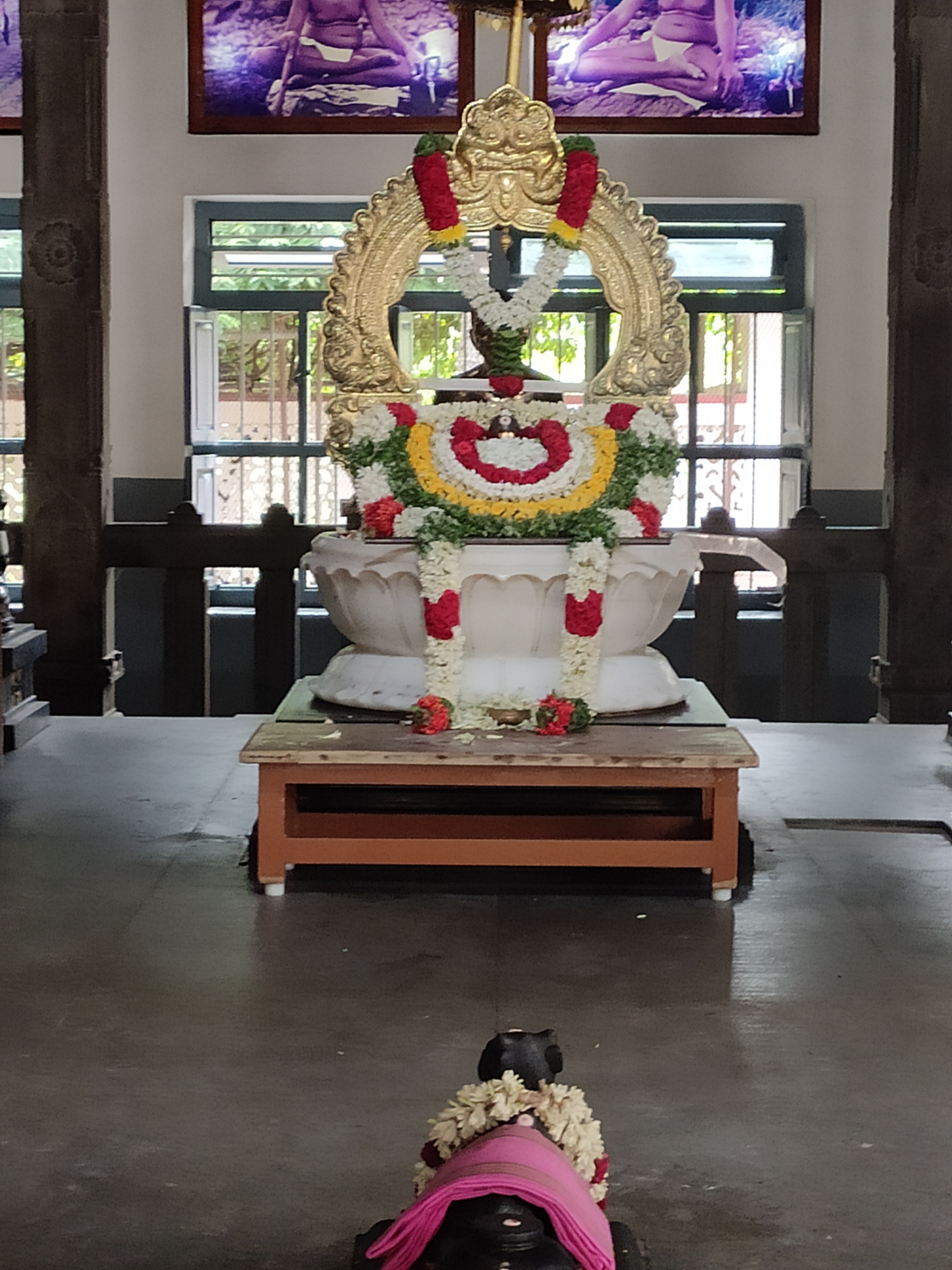
The Samadhi (tomb) of Sri Ramana Maharshi

== Devotion ==
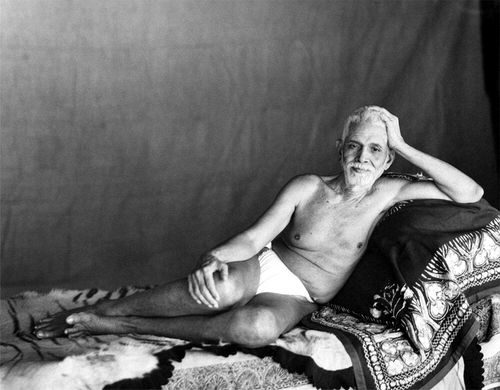
Sri Ramana Maharshi reclining in the Old Hall where he lived from 1927 to 1950

Ramana Maharshi was, and is, regarded by many as an outstanding enlightened being. He was considered to be a charismatic person, and attracted many devotees, some of whom saw him as an avatar and the embodiment of Shiva.

=== Darshan and prasad ===
Many devotees visited Ramana Maharshi for darshan, the sight of a holy person or God incarnate, which is advantageous and transmits merit. According to Flood, in Indian religions the guru is akin to the image or statue of a deity in the temple, and both possess power and a sacred energy. According to Osborne, Ramana Maharshi regarded giving darshan as "his task in life", and said that he had to be accessible to all who came. Even during his terminal illness at the end of his life, he demanded to be approachable for all who came for his darshan.

Objects being touched or used by him were highly valued by his devotees, "as they considered it to be prasad and that it passed on some of the power and blessing of the Guru to them". People also tried to touch his feet, which is also considered darshana. When one devotee asked if it would be possible to prostrate before Sri Ramana Maharshi and touch his feet, he replied:

The real feet of Bhagavan exist only in the heart of the devotee. To hold onto these feet incessantly is true happiness. You will be disappointed if you hold onto my physical feet because one day this physical body will disappear. The greatest worship is worshipping the Guru's feet that are within oneself.

In later life, the number of devotees and their devotion grew so large that Ramana Maharshi became restricted in his daily routine. Measures had to be taken to prevent people touching him. Several times Ramana Maharshi tried to escape from the ashram, to return to a life of solitude. Vasudeva reports: "Bhagavan sat on a rock and said with tears in his eyes that he would never again come to the Ashram and would go where he pleased and live in the forests or caves away from all men."

Ramana Maharshi did return to the ashram, but has also reported himself on attempts to leave the ashram:

I tried to be free on a third occasion also. That was after mother's passing away. I did not want to have even an Ashram like Skandashram and the people that were coming there then. But the result has been this Ashram [Ramanashram] and all the crowd here. Thus, all my three attempts failed.

=== Avatar ===
Some of Ramana Maharshi's devotees regarded him to be as Dakshinamurti; as an avatar of Skanda, a divine form of Shiva popular in Tamil Nadu; as an incarnation of Jnana Sambandar, one of the sixty-three Nayanars; and as an incarnation of Kumārila Bhaṭṭa, the 8th century Mimamsa-philosopher. According to Krishna Bhikshu, one of his early biographers:

As Kumarila he established the supremacy of the karma marga, as Jnana Sambandar, a poet, he brought bhakti marga close to the people and as Ramana Maharshi he showed that the purpose of life was to abide in the Self and to stay in the sahaja state by the jnana marga.

=== Indian devotees ===
A number of Ramana Maharshi's Indian devotees (a more extensive list of devotees can be found in V. Ganesan's Ramana Periya Puranam):

- Ganapati Muni (1878–1936), Sanskrit scholar and poet, activist for Indian independence, and one of Ramana Maharshi's foremost devotees. Muni devised the name "Ramana Maharshi".
- Gudipati Venkatachalam (1894–1976), a noted Telugu writer, who lived the later part of his life and died near Ramana Maharshi's ashram in Tiruvannamalai.
- Annamalai Swami, who came to Ramana Maharshi at the age of 22, served him devotedly, and oversaw the construction of Ramanasramam's buildings under Bhagavan's guidance. Through Bhagavan's grace and rigorous sādhana, he attained Self-realization.
- H. W. L. Poonja, who in 1944 visited Ramana Maharshi and realized the Self in his presence. Later, Poonja gave satsang and introduced Maharshi's teachings to seekers of Truth from all over the world.
- Swami Ramdas visited Ramana Maharshi while on pilgrimage in 1922, and after darshan, spent 21 days meditating in solitude in a cave on Arunachala. Thereafter, he attained the direct realisation that "All was Rama, nothing but Rama." (Note: The Mountain Path, January 1965, Swami Ramdas)
- O. P. Ramaswamy Reddiyar, an Indian National Congress politician and freedom fighter, who served as the Premier of Madras from 1947 to 1949.
- Sri Muruganar (1890–1973), known as "the shadow of Bhagavan", is widely regarded as one of the foremost devotees of Ramana Maharshi. He composed thousands of poems praising Bhagavan and his teachings, many of which express his gratitude for the direct experience of the Self and liberation that Bhagavan bestowed upon him.
- Manavasi Ramaswami Iyer, who composed Saranagati, a popular Tamil devotional song to Ramana Maharshi.
- Sri Sadhu Om, who compiled and edited Sri Muruganar's collection of songs into a multi-volume series, a task that took him about 18 years.

=== Western devotees ===
A list of Western devotees of Ramana Maharshi (not comprehensive):

- Paul Brunton's writings about Ramana Maharshi brought considerable attention to him in the West.
- Arthur Osborne, the first editor of the ashram journal, The Mountain Path.
- Maurice Frydman (a.k.a. Swami Bharatananda), a Polish-Jewish engineer and humanitarian who later translated Nisargadatta Maharaj's work I Am That from Marathi to English, was also deeply influenced by Ramana Maharshi's teachings. Many of the questions published in Maharshi's Gospel (1939) were put by Maurice, and they elicited detailed replies from the Maharshi. Maharshi's Gospel is the only English language text that was personally proofread by Ramana Maharshi – the original manuscript with corrections in Ramana Maharshi's handwriting still exists in the Ashram Archives. (Note: About Frydman, Sri Ramana Maharshi had remarked "He belongs only here (to India). Somehow he was born abroad, but has come again here." (Note: Mountain Path, No. 1, 1977, Maurice Frydman by Dr. M.Sadashiva Rao))
- Ethel Merston, who wrote about Ramana Maharshi in her memoirs.
- Mouni Sadhu (Mieczyslaw Demetriusz Sudowski) (17 August 1897 – 24 December 1971), an Australian author of spiritual, mystical and esoteric subjects.
- David Godman, a former librarian at the ashram, who has written about Ramana Maharshi's teaching and the lives of Ramana Maharshi's lesser-known attendants and devotees.

== Spiritual instruction ==
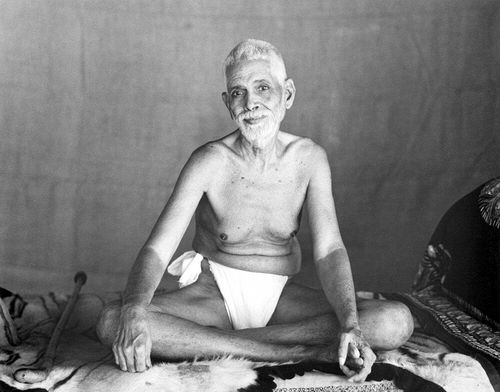
Ramana Maharshi sitting in the Old Hall at Sri Ramanasramam

Ramana Maharshi provided upadeśa ("spiritual instruction") by providing darshan and by sitting silently together with devotees and visitors (satsang), but also by answering the questions and concerns raised by those who sought him out. Many of these question-and-answer sessions have been transcribed and published by devotees, some of which have been edited by Ramana Maharshi himself. A few texts have been published which were written by Ramana Maharshi himself, or written down on his behalf and edited by him.

Ramana Maharshi also provided an example by his own devotion to Shiva, which has been extensively described by his devotees, such as walks around the holy hill Arunachala, in which devotees participated, and his hymns to Arunachala.

=== Real I ===
Ramana Maharshi described his 'real I' as a "force" or "current", which descended on him in his death-experience, and continued throughout his life:

... a force or current, a centre of energy playing on the body, continuing regardless of the rigidity or activity of the body, though existing in connection with it. It was that current, force or centre that constituted my Self, that kept me acting and moving, but this was the first time I came to know it [...] I had no idea at that time of the identity of that current with the personal God, or Iswara as I used to call him [...] I was only feeling that everything was being done by the current and not by me [...] This current, or avesam, now felt as if it was my Self, not a superimposition [...] That avesam continues right up to now.

Ramana Maharshi used various terms to denote this 'real I'. (Note: According to David Godman, each term signifies a different aspect of "the same indivisible reality".) The most frequently used terms were sat-chit-ananda, which translates into English as "being-consciousness-bliss". God, Brahman and Siva were also used, (Note: According to David Godman, Ramana Maharshi would use these terms not to refer to a personal God, but to the "formless being which sustains the universe".) as well as the Heart (not to be confused with the physical heart, or a particular point in space), which is equivalent to the Self, the source from which all appearances manifest.

According to David Godman, the essence of Ramana Maharshi's teachings is that the "Self" or real "I" is a "non-personal, all-inclusive awareness":

The real Self or real 'I' is, contrary to perceptible experience, not an experience of individuality but a non-personal, all-inclusive awareness. It is not to be confused with the individual self which (Ramana Maharshi) said was essentially non-existent, being a fabrication of the mind, which obscures the true experience of the real Self. He maintained that the real Self is always present and always experienced but he emphasized that one is only consciously aware of it as it really is when the self-limiting tendencies of the mind have ceased. Permanent and continuous Self-awareness is known as Self-realization.

Ramana Maharshi considered the 'real I' to be permanent and enduring, surviving physical death. "The sleep, dream and waking states are mere phenomena appearing on the Self," as is the "I"-thought. Our "true nature" is "simple Being, free from thoughts".

Ramana Maharshi would field many questions about jnanis ("liberated beings") from devotees, but even the terms jnani and ajnani (non-liberated being) are incorrect, since it leads one to the idea of there being a knower and a known, a subject and an object. The truth of it according to Ramana Maharshi is that there are neither jnanis nor ajnanis, there is simply jnana, which is Self:

The jnani sees no one as an ajnani. All are only jnanis in his sight. In the ignorant state one superimposes one's ignorance on a jnani and mistakes him for a doer. In the state of jnana, the jnani sees nothing separate from the Self. The Self is all shining and only pure jnana.

=== Silence ===
Ramana Maharshi's main means of instruction to his devotees, in order to remove ignorance and abide in Self-awareness, was through silently sitting together with his visitors, (Note: Sr Ramanashram, Teachings) using words only sparingly. His method of instruction has been compared to Dakshinamurti – Shiva in the ascetic appearance of the Guru, who teaches through silence:

One evening, devotees asked Sri Ramana Maharshi to explain the meaning of Shankara's hymn in praise of Dakshinamurti. They waited for his answer, but in vain. The Maharishi sat motionless on his seat, in total silence.

Commenting upon this silence, Ramana Maharshi said:

Silence is the true upadesa. It is the perfect upadesa. It is suited only for the most advanced seeker. The others are unable to draw full inspiration from it. Therefore, they require words to explain the truth. But truth is beyond words; it does not warrant explanation. All that is possible is to indicate It. How is that to be done?

Ankur Barua argues that Ramana Maharshi's method of teaching resembled Socratic questioning, guiding seekers to reflect on the source of their own inquiries, which was often aided by silence. In his dialogues with devotees, Ramana emphasised the importance of exploring the nature of the questioner, and not the question. In such moments, the devotee is left in silence.

=== Self-enquiry ===
Vichara, "Self-enquiry", also called ātma-vichār or jnana-vichara is the constant attention to the inner awareness of "I" or "I am". Ramana Maharshi frequently recommended it as the most efficient and direct way of realising Self-awareness, in response to questions on self-liberation and the classic texts on Yoga and Vedanta. (Note: David Godman (1991), 'I' and 'I-I' – A Reader's Query. The Mountain Path, 1991, pp. 79–88. Part one) (Note: According to Krishna Bhikshu, an early biographer of Ramana Maharshi, "[a] new path for attaining moksha was indicated here. Nobody else had discovered this path earlier". According to David Frawley, atma-vichara is the most important practice in the Advaita Vedanta tradition, predating its popularisation by Ramana Maharshi. (Note: David Frawley, Self-Inquiry and Its Practice) It is part of the eighth limb of Patanjali's Yoga Sutras, which describes the various stages of samadhi. Meditation on "I-am-ness" is a subtle object of meditation in savikalpa samadhi. It is also described in the Yoga Vasistha, a syncretic work which may date from the 6th or 7th century CE, and shows influences from Yoga, Samkhya, Saiva Siddhanta and Mahayana Buddhism, especially Yogacara. The practice is also well-known from Chinese Chán Buddhism, especially from Dahui Zonggao's Hua Tou practice.) He instructed his disciples to practice self-inquiry "to access the ultimate source of the limited ego," and to experience "the divine Self" through direct experience, rather than through a mere intellectual process. Ramana Maharshi emphasised that without self-enquiry, other methods may temporarily calm the mind but are ineffective in dissolving the ego.

According to Ramana Maharshi, the I-thought (Note: Ahamkara or Aham-Vritti) is the sense of individuality: "(Aham, aham) 'I-I' is the Self; (Aham idam) "I am this" or "I am that" is the ego." By paying attention to the 'I'-thought, inquiring where it comes from, (Note: According to Ramana Maharshi, one realises that it rises in the hṛdayam (heart). "Hṛdayam" consists of two syllables 'hṛt' and 'ayam' which signify "I am the Heart". (Note: Vichara Marga, Ramana Maharshi's "Who Am I?") The use of the word "hṛdayam" is not unique to Ramana Maharshi. A famous Buddhist use is the Prajñāpāramitā Hṛdaya Sutra, the Heart Sutra) the 'I'-thought will disappear and the "shining forth" (sphurana) of "I-I" (Note: David Godman (1991), 'I' and 'I-I' – A Reader's Query, The Mountain Path, 1991, pp. 79–88. Part one) (Note: "Nan-nan," literally "I-I", also translated as "I am, I am", "being-consciousness", (Note: David Godman Homepage) and "I am I". (Note: Michael James, 2. நான் நான் (nāṉ nāṉ) means 'I am I', not 'I-I') According to David Godman, the "I-I" is an intermediary realisation between the "I" (ego) and the Self. "[T]he verses on 'I-I' that Bhagavan wrote are open to two interpretations. They can be taken either to mean that the 'I-I' is experienced as a consequence of realisation or as a precursor to it. My own view, and I would stress that it is only a personal opinion, is that the evidence points to it being a precursor only. (Note: David Godman (1991), "I" and "I-I" – A Reader's Query. The Mountain Path, 1991, pp. 79–88. Part two)) or Self-awareness will appear. (Note: Ramana Maharshi: "(Aham, aham) 'I-I' is the Self; (Aham idam) "I am this" or "I am that" is the ego. Shining is there always. The ego is transitory; When the 'I' is kept up as 'I' alone it is the Self; when it flies at a tangent and says "this" it is the ego." David Godman: "the expression 'nan-nan' ('I-I' in Tamil) would generally be taken to mean 'I am I' by a Tamilian. This interpretation would make 'I-I' an emphatic statement of Self-awareness akin to the biblical 'I am that I am' which Bhagavan occasionally said summarised the whole of Vedanta. Bhagavan himself has said that he used the term 'I-I' to denote the import of the word 'I'.") This results in an "effortless awareness of being", and by staying with it (Note: According to Sadu Om, self-enquiry can also be seen as 'Self-attention' or 'Self-abiding'.) this "I-I" gradually destroys the vasanas "which cause the 'I'-thought to rise". When the vasanas disappear, the mind, vritti (Note: Conceptual thinking, memory, the creation of "things" in the mind) also comes to rest, since it centers around the 'I'-thought, and finally the 'I'-thought never rises again, which is Self-realisation or liberation:

If one remains still without leaving it, even the sphurana – having completely annihilated the sense of the individuality, the form of the ego, 'I am the body' – will itself in the end subside, just like the flame that catches the camphor. This alone is said to be liberation by great ones and scriptures. (The Mountain Path, 1982, p. 98). (Note: Ramana Maharshi: "Liberation (mukti) is the total destruction of the I-impetus aham-kara, of the "me"- and "my"-impetus (mama-kara)".)

Robert Forman notes that Ramana Maharshi made a distinction between samadhi and sahaja samadhi. Samadhi is a contemplative state, which is temporary, while in sahaja samadhi a "silent state" is maintained while engaged in daily activities. Ramana Maharshi himself stated repeatedly that samadhi only suppresses the vāsanās, the karmic impressions, but does not destroy them. Only by abiding in Self-awareness will the vāsanās, which create the sense of a separate self, be destroyed, and sahaja samadhi be attained. (Note: The distinction, made by Walter Terence Stace, between "introvertive mysticism" and "extrovertive mysticism", is at the heart of the contemporary debates on mysticism and mystical experience. Whereas Stace regarded these two forms as different forms of mysticism, Forman sees them as developmental stages. Forman also notes that "the first experience of samadhi [by Ramana Maharshi] preceded sahaja samadhi by several years". See also Training after kenshō.)

=== Bhakti ===
Although Ramana Maharshi advocated self-enquiry as the fastest means to realisation, he also recommended the path of bhakti and self-surrender (to one's deity or guru) either concurrently or as an adequate alternative, which would ultimately converge with the path of self-enquiry. According to Ramana Maharshi, Jnana and Bhakti are not different paths, but both lead to the same goal: the realisation of the Self. He taught that true Bhakti is love for the Self, and since the Self is God, love for the Self is also love for God.

Surrender has to be complete and desireless, without any expectations of solutions or rewards, or even liberation. It is a willingness to accept whatever happens. Surrender is not the willful act of an individual self, but the growing awareness that there is no individual self to surrender. Practice is aimed at the removal of ignorance, not at the attainment of realisation.

Bhagavan: There are only two ways to conquer destiny or to be independent of it. One is to inquire whose this destiny is and discover that only the ego is bound by it and not the Self and that the ego is non-existent. The other way is to kill the ego by completely surrendering to the Lord, realizing one's helplessness and saying all the time: "Not I, but Thou, oh Lord," giving up all sense of "I" and "mine" and leaving it to the Lord to do what He likes with you. Surrender can never be regarded as complete so long as the devotee wants this or that from the Lord. True surrender is the love of God for the sake of love and nothing else, not even for the sake of salvation. In other words, complete effacement of the ego is necessary to conquer destiny, whether you achieve this effacement through Self-inquiry or through bhakti-marga.

=== Reincarnation ===
According to David Godman, Ramana Maharshi taught that the idea of reincarnation is based on wrong ideas about the individual self as being real. Ramana Maharshi would sometimes say that rebirth does exist, to step forward to those who were not able to fully grasp the non-reality of the individual self. But when this illusoriness is realised, there is no room any more for ideas about reincarnation. When the identification with the body stops, any notions about death and rebirth become inapplicable, since there is no birth or death within Self, a teaching known as Ajativada. Ramana Maharshi:

Reincarnation exists only so long as there is ignorance. There is really no reincarnation at all, either now or before. Nor will there be any hereafter. This is the truth.

=== Yoga ===
Ramana Maharshi viewed yoga as a means to steady the mind and support self-enquiry. He suggested practices like devotion, breath control, and meditation (dhyana) to calm the restless mind and focus it on the self.

== Background ==
=== Indian spirituality ===
According to Wehr, C. G. Jung noted that Ramana Maharshi is not to be regarded as an "isolated phenomenon", but as a token of Indian spirituality, "manifest in many forms in everyday Indian life". (Note: Jung wrote the foreword to Heinrich Zimmer's Der Weg zum Selbst, "The Path to the Self" (1944), an early collection of translations of Ramana Maharshi's teachings in a western language.) According to Zimmer and Jung, Ramana Maharshi's appearance as a mauni, a silent saint absorbed in samadhi, fitted into pre-existing Indian notions of holiness. They placed the Indian devotion toward Ramana Maharshi in this Indian context. (Note: Michaels uses Bourdieu's notion of habitus to point to the power of "culturally acquired lifestyles and attitudes, habits and predispositions, as well as conscious, deliberate acts or mythological, theological, or philosophical artifacts and mental productions" in his understanding of Hinduism.)

According to Alan Edwards, the popular image of Ramana Maharshi as a timeless saint also served the construction of an Indian identity as inner-oriented and spiritual, in opposition to the oppressive, outer-oriented, materialistic culture of the British colonial rulers:

Hindus from all over India could look to the purely spiritual Maharshi as a symbol that inspired them to preserve their distinctive national culture and identity, which of course entailed forcing the British to quit India. (Note: Edwards notes the pervading influence of western Orientalism on the perception of Ramana Maharshi, even in western scholarship, which tends to favour this picture of the timeless guru: "...scholarship can misinterpret and misrepresent religious figures because of the failure to recognise the presence of [Orientalist stereotypes] and assumptions, and also because of the failure to maintain critical distance when dealing with the rhetoric of devotional literature". (Note: New Zealand Asian Studies Society Inc, Newsletter No. 22, May 2011) See also King, Richard (2002), Orientalism and Religion: Post-Colonial Theory, India and "The Mystic East", Routledge, and Zen Narratives for a similar romantisation of Zen and its archetypal Rōshi.)

=== Shaivism ===
Though Ramana Maharshi's answers explain and incorporate elements from Advaita Vedanta, his spiritual life is strongly associated with Shaivism. The Tamil compendium of devotional songs known as Tirumurai, along with the Vedas, the Shaiva Agamas and "Meykanda" or "Siddhanta" Shastras, form the scriptural canon of Tamil Shaiva Siddhanta. As a youth, prior to his awakening, Ramana Maharshi read the Periya Puranam, the stories of the 63 Tamil saints. In later life, he told those stories to his devotees:

When telling these stories, he used to dramatize the characters of the main figures in voice and gesture and seemed to identify himself fully with them.

Ramana Maharshi himself considered God, Guru and Self to be the manifestations of the same reality. (Note: arunachala.org, The Teachings of Sri Ramana Maharshi) Ramana Maharshi considered the Self to be his guru, in the form of the sacred mountain Arunachala, which is considered to be the manifestation of Shiva. Arunachala is one of the five main shaivite holy places in South India, which can be worshipped through the mantra "Om arunachala shivaya namah!" and by Pradakshina, walking around the mountain, a practice which was often performed by Ramana Maharshi. Asked about the special sanctity of Arunachala, Ramana Maharshi said that Arunachala is Shiva himself. (Note: Shankara saw Arunchala as Mount Meru, which is in Indian mythology the axis of the world, and the abode of Brahman and the gods. (Note: Encyclopædia Britannica, Mount Meru)) In his later years, Ramana Maharshi said it was the spiritual power of Arunachala which had brought about his Self-realisation. He composed the Five Hymns to Arunachala as devotional song. On the three occasions Venkataraman (Ramana) referred to himself he used the name Arunachala Ramana. Ramana Maharshi also used to smear his forehead with holy ash, as a token of veneration.

In later life, Ramana Maharshi himself came to be regarded as Dakshinamurthy, an aspect of Shiva as a guru of all types of knowledge, and bestower of jnana. This aspect of Shiva is his personification as the supreme or the ultimate awareness, understanding and knowledge. This form represents Shiva in his aspect as a teacher of yoga, music, and wisdom, and giving exposition on the shastras.

=== Acquaintance with Hindu scriptures ===
During his lifetime, through contact with educated devotees like Ganapata Muni, Ramana Maharshi became acquainted with works on Shaivism and Advaita Vedanta, and used them to explain his insights:

People wonder how I speak of Bhagavad Gita, etc. It is due to hearsay. I have not read the Gita nor waded through commentaries for its meaning. When I hear a sloka (verse), I think its meaning is clear and I say it. That is all and nothing more.

Already in 1896, a few months after his arrival at Arunachala, Ramana Maharshi attracted his first disciple, Uddandi Nayinar, who recognised in him "the living embodiment of the Holy Scriptures". Uddandi was well-versed in classic texts on Yoga and Vedanta, and recited texts as the Yoga Vasistha and Kaivalya Navaneeta in Ramana Maharshi's presence.

In 1897 Ramana Maharshi was joined by Palaniswami, who became his attendant. Palaniswami studied books in Tamil on Vedanta, such as Kaivalya Navaneeta, Shankara's Vivekachudamani, and Yoga Vasistha. He had difficulties understanding Tamil. Ramana Maharshi read the books too, and explained them to Palaniswami.

As early as 1900, when Ramana Maharshi was 20 years old, he became acquainted with the teachings of the Hindu monk and Neo-Vedanta teacher Swami Vivekananda through Gambhiram Seshayya. Seshayya was interested in yoga techniques, and "used to bring his books and explain his difficulties". Ramana Maharshi answered on small scraps of paper, which were collected after his death in the late 1920s in a booklet called Vichara Sangraham, "Self-enquiry".

One of the works that Ramana Maharshi used to explain his insights was the Ribhu Gita, a song at the heart of the Shivarahasya Purana, one of the 'Shaiva Upapuranas' or ancillary Purana regarding Shiva and Shaivite worship. Another work used by him was the Dakshinamurti Stotram, a text by Shankara. It is a hymn to Shiva, explaining Advaita Vedanta.

Ramana Maharshi gave his approval to a variety of paths and practices from various religions, with his own upadesa (instruction or guidance given to a disciple by his Guru) (Note: Arthur Osborne, Ramana Maharshi and the Path of Self-Knowledge. Glossary) always pointing to the true Self of the devotees.

=== Advaita Vedanta ===
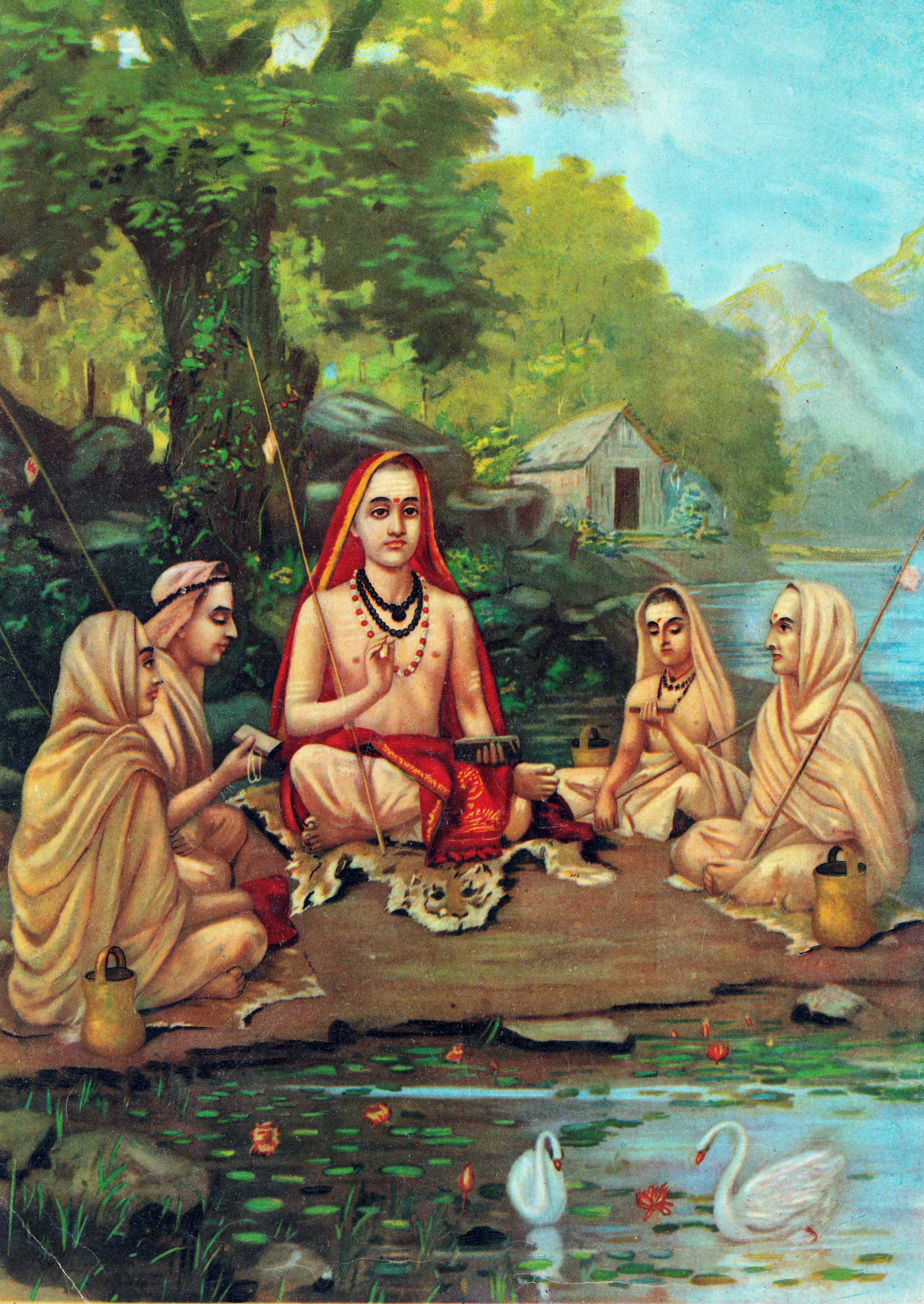
Adi Shankara with Disciples, by Raja Ravi Varma (1904)

In contrast to classical Advaita Vedanta, Ramana Maharshi emphasised the personal experience of self-realisation, instead of philosophical argumentation and the study of scripture. Ramana Maharshi's authority was based on his personal experience, from which he explained classic texts on Yoga and Vedanta, which he became acquainted with via his devotees. Arvind Sharma qualifies Ramana Maharshi as the chief exponent of experiential Advaita, to distinguish his approach from Shankara's classical doctrinal Advaita. Fort classifies him as a neo-Vedantin, because of the focus on self-inquiry instead of philosophical speculation. Ramana Maharshi himself did not call his insights advaita, but said that dvaita and advaita are relative terms, based on a sense of duality, while the Self or Being is all there is.

Although Ramana Maharshi's teaching is consistent with and generally associated with Hinduism, the Upanishads and Advaita Vedanta, there are differences with the traditional Advaitic school. Advaita recommends a negationist neti, neti (Sanskrit, "not this", "not this") path, or mental affirmations that the Self is the only reality, such as "I am Brahman" or "I am He", while Ramana Maharshi advocated Self-enquiry Nan Yar. In contrast with traditional Advaita Vedanta, Ramana Maharshi strongly discouraged devotees from adopting a renunciate lifestyle and renouncing their responsibilities. To one devotee who felt he should abandon his family, whom he described as "samsara" ("illusion"), to intensify his spiritual practice, Sri Ramana Maharshi replied:

Oh! Is that so? What really is meant by samsara? Is it within or without? Wife, children and others. Is that all the samsara? What have they done? Please find out first what really is meant by samsara. Afterwards we shall consider the question of abandoning them.

The scholar of religion Lola Williamson has described Indian gurus such as Ramana Maharshi, Meher Baba, Sri Aurobindo and Swami Satchidananda Saraswati as having developed "Hindu-Inspired Meditation Movements", also called neo-Vedanta and modernist Hinduism.

== Legacy ==
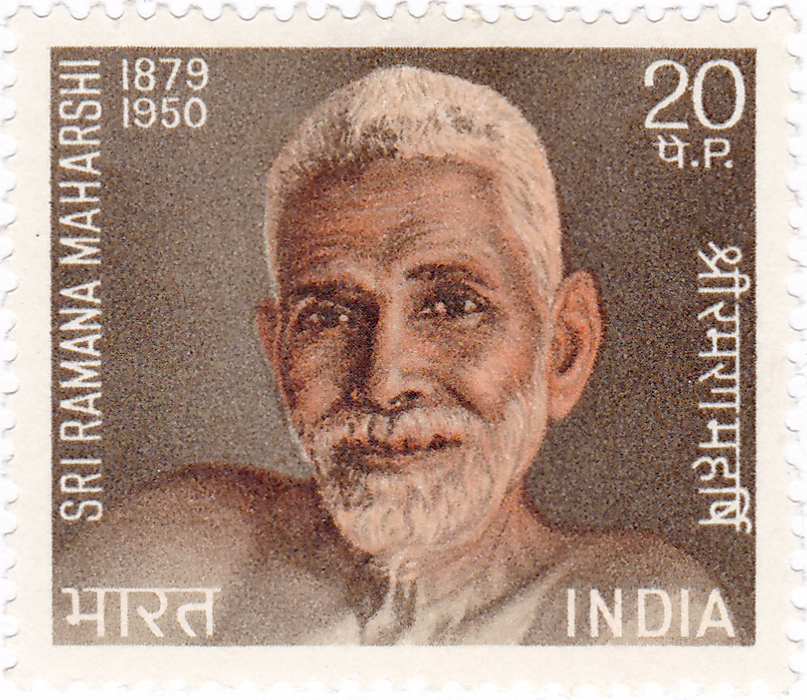
Maharshi on a 1971 stamp of India

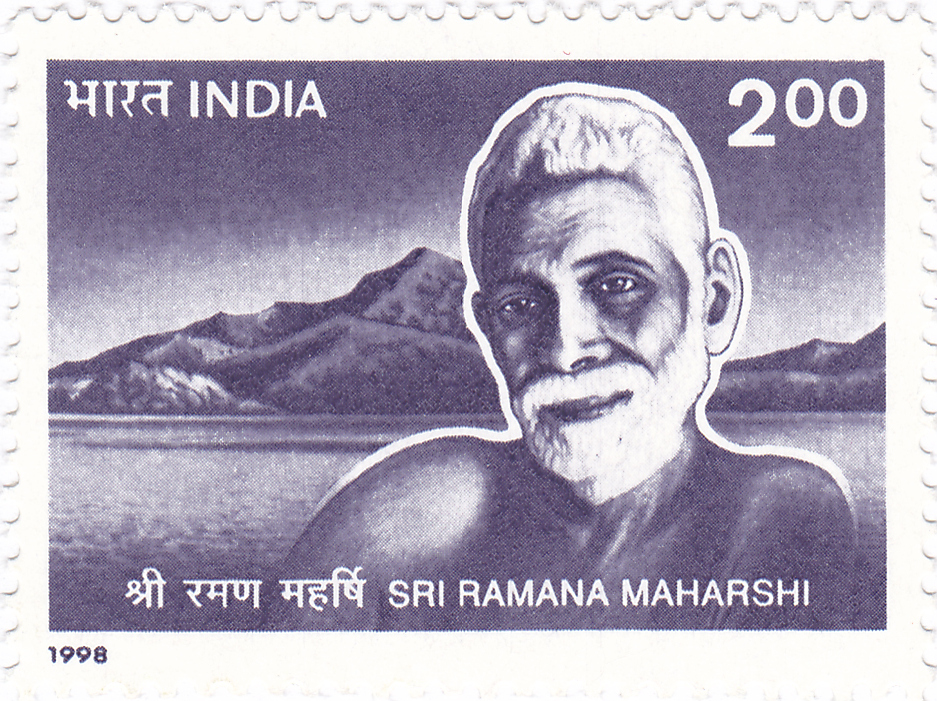
Ramana Maharshi 1998 stamp of India

Although many claim to be influenced by him, (Note: advaita.org.uk, Disciples of Ramana Maharshi) Ramana Maharshi did not publicise himself as a guru, never claimed to have disciples, and never appointed any successors. (Note: John David, An Introduction to Sri Ramana's Life and Teachings. David Godman talks to John David. Page 6) (Note: arunachala-ramana.org, Bhagavan Sri Ramana Maharshi – Great Sage or Milch cow?) While a few who came to see him are said to have become enlightened through association, (Note: For example, H. W. L. Poonja (Note: Papaji Biography, With Ramana Again)) he did not publicly acknowledge any living person as liberated other than his mother at death. Ramana Maharshi never promoted any lineage.

With regard to the Sri Ramana Ashram, in 1938 Maharshi made a legal will bequeathing all the Ramanashram properties to his younger brother Niranjanananda and his descendants. In 2013, Ramanashram is run by Sri Niranjananda's grandson Sri V.S. Raman. Ramanashram is legally recognised as a public religious trust whose aim is to maintain it in a way that is consistent with Sri Ramana Maharshi's declared wishes. The ashram should remain open as a spiritual institution so that anyone who wishes to can avail themselves of its facilities.

In the 1930s, Maharshi's teachings were brought to the west by Paul Brunton in his A Search in Secret India. (Note: Brunton had been a member of the Theosophical Society, which searched for ancient wisdom in the east, and the Society was a major force in the exposure of the west to Asian spirituality. One of its salient features was the belief in "Masters of Wisdom". The Theosophical Society also spread western ideas in the east, aiding a modernisation of eastern traditions, and contributing to a growing nationalism in the Asian colonies. The Theosophical Society had a major influence on Buddhist modernism and Hindu reform movements, and the spread of those modernised versions in the west. The Theosophical Society and the Arya Samaj were united from 1878 to 1882, as the Theosophical Society of the Arya Samaj. Along with H. S. Olcott and Anagarika Dharmapala, Blavatsky was instrumental in the Western transmission and revival of Theravada Buddhism.) Stimulated by Arthur Osborne, in the 1960s Bhagawat Singh actively started to spread Ramana Maharshi's teachings in the US. Ramana Maharshi has been further popularised in the west by the neo-Advaita movement, via the students of H. W. L. Poonja; this movement gives a western re-interpretation of his teachings by placing sole emphasis on insight alone. It has been criticised for this emphasis, omitting the preparatory practices. (Note: See also Timothy Conway, Neo-Advaita or Pseudo-Advaita and Real Advaita-Nonduality) Nevertheless, Neo-Advaita has become an important constituent of popular western spirituality.

The scholar Philip Goldberg has listed Western religious thinkers influenced by Ramana Maharshi as including Francis X. Clooney, Georg Feuerstein, Bede Griffiths, Andrew Harvey, Thomas Merton, Henri Le Saux (Swami Abhishiktananada), Eckhart Tolle, and Ken Wilber.

The scholar Isaac Portilla has pointed out the importance of Ramana Maharshi for interfaith dialogue, noticing both his universal message of religious unity and his distinctive iconic status:

Ramana, in his universalist stance, is an important figure for interfaith dialogue, and scholars such as Thomas Forsthoefel and [Mario] Aguilar have paid due attention to this possibility. From the view I am presenting, in engaging with the complexities of mystical experience and emphasizing distinctiveness, Ramana’s contribution to interfaith dialogue is strengthened—his relevance being greater than that of the sage with a universalist message. That is: in his uniqueness, Ramana is proclaiming with idiosyncratic power and authority (as an avatar of Hinduism) a universal substratum of religion—Brahman, the Self—which cannot be accepted as justifying the erosion of differences; indeed, his varied experiences invite to explore further depths of any tradition considered.

Regarding Ramana Maharshi’s uniqueness, Portilla has argued there are several experiences described by Maharshi himself, which together may justify his transformative and powerful presence:

1. Depth of Self-realization, Maharshi having reached the seventh stage of knowledge (jñāna bhūmika), while most sages (jñānis) remain in the fourth stage.
2. The importance of the spiritual heart, recognized as both Brahman and the core of the subtle anatomy. Regarding the subtle anatomy, Maharshi experienced the curved descent of the Spirit Force into the heart (amṛta nāḍī), hence going beyond the classical ascension of consciousness in yoga (suṣumṇā nāḍī). The spiritual heart, according to Maharshi, is located slightly on the right side of the chest.
3. Degree of renunciation, Maharshi being beyond all the Hindu stages of life (āśramas) and not knowing of anyone in his state-beyond-stage (ativarnāsrama), but, tentatively, ancient sages of India.

To mark the centenary of the ashram (1922-2022), the Government of India Mint released a commemorative coin in silver to "honour both the enduring spiritual influence of Bhagavan Sri Ramana Maharshi and the historic role of Sri Ramana Ashram."

== Works ==
=== Writings ===
According to Ebert, Ramana Maharshi "never felt moved to formulate his teaching of his own accord, either verbally or in writing". The few writings he is credited with "came into being as answers to questions asked by his disciples or through their urging". Only a few hymns were written on his own initiative. Writings by Ramana Maharshi are:

- Gambhiram Sheshayya, Vichāra Sangraham, "Self-Enquiry". Answers to questions, compiled in 1901, published in dialogue-form, republished as essay in 1939 as A Catechism of Enquiry. Also published in 1944 in Heinrich Zimmer's Der Weg zum Selbst.
- Sivaprakasam Pillai, Nān Yār?, "Who am I?". Answers to questions, compiled in 1902, first published in 1923. (Note: Who am I? – pdf)
- Five Hymns to Arunachala:
  - Akshara Mana Malai, "The Marital Garland of Letters". In 1914, at the request of a devotee, Ramana Maharshi wrote Akshara Mana Malai for his devotees to sing while on their rounds for alms. It's a hymn in praise of Shiva, manifest as the mountain Arunachala. The hymn consists of 108 stanzas composed in poetic Tamil.
  - Navamani Mālai, "The Necklet of Nine Gems".
  - Arunāchala Patikam, "Eleven Verses to Sri Arunachala".
  - Arunāchala Ashtakam, "Eight Stanzas to Sri Arunachala".
  - Arunāchala Pañcharatna, "Five Stanzas to Sri Arunachala".
- Sri Muruganar and Sri Ramana Maharshi, Upadesha Sāra (Upadesha Undiyar), "The Essence of Instruction". In 1927 Muruganar started a poem on the Gods, but asked Ramana Maharshi to write thirty verses on upadesha, "teaching" or "instruction".
- Ramana Maharshi, Ulladu narpadu, "Forty Verses on Reality". Written in 1928. First English translation and commentary by S.S. Cohen in 1931.
- Ullada Nārpadu Anubandham, "Reality in Forty Verses: Supplement". Forty stanzas, fifteen of which are being written by Ramana Maharshi. The other twenty-five are translations of various Sanskrit-texts.
- Sri Muruganar and Sri Ramana Maharshi (1930s), Ramana Puranam. (Note: Ramana Puranam)
- Ekātma Pañchakam, "Five Verses on the Self". Written in 1947, at the request of a female devotee.

All these texts are collected in the Collected Works. In addition to original works, Ramana Maharshi has also translated some scriptures for the benefit of devotees. He selected, rearranged and translated 42 verses from the Bhagavad Gita into Tamil and Malayalam. He has also translated few works such as Dakshinamurti Stotra, Vivekachudamani and Dṛg-Dṛśya-Viveka attributed to Shankarachaya.

=== Recorded talks ===
Several collections of recorded talks, in which Sri Ramana Maharshi used Tamil, Telugu and Malayalam, have been published. Those are based on written transcripts, which were "hurriedly written down in English by his official interpreters". (Note: David Godman: "Because some of the interpreters were not completely fluent in English some of the transcriptions were either ungrammatical or written in a kind of stilted English which occasionally makes Sri Ramana Maharshi sound like a pompous Victorian.")

- Sri Natanananda, Upadesa Manjari, "Origin of Spiritual Instruction". Recordings of dialogues between Sri Ramana Maharshi and devotees. First published in English in 1939 as A Catechism of Instruction. (Note: Society of Abidance in Truth, Origin of Spiritual Instruction)
- Munagala Venkataramaiah, Talks with Sri Ramana. Talks recorded between 1935 and 1939. Various editions:
  - Print: Venkataramaiah, Munagala (2000), Talks With Sri Ramana Maharshi: On Realizing Abiding Peace and Happiness, Inner Directions, ISBN 1-878019-00-7
  - Online: Venkataramaiah, Munagala (2000), Talks with Sri Ramana. Three volumes in one. Extract version (PDF), Tiruvannamalai: Sriramanasasram
  - Venkataramaiah, Munagala (2006), Talks With Sri Ramana Maharshi (PDF), Sri Ramanasramam, archived from the original (PDF) on 5 July 2010
- Brunton, Paul; Venkataramaiah, Munagala (1984), Conscious Immortality: Conversations with Sri Ramana Maharshi, Sri Ramanasramam
- Devaraja Mudaliar, A. (2002), Day by Day with Bhagavan. From a Diary of A. DEVARAJA MUDALIAR. (Covering March 16, 1945 to January 4, 1947) (PDF), ISBN 81-88018-82-1, archived from the original (PDF) on 19 November 2012 Talks recorded between 1945 and 1947.
- Natarajan, A. R. (1992), A Practical Guide to Know Yourself: Conversations with Sri Ramana Maharshi, Ramana Maharshi Centre for Learning, ISBN 81-85378-09-6
- Aiyyer Gajapathi (2004), Aham Sphurana: Scintillations of Jnana from Sri Ramana Maharshi: A Journal Containing Previously Unpublished Conversations with the Master. Complete edition containing dialogues from 1936. ISBN 979-8464538719
- Aiyyer, Gajapathi (2022) Aham Sphurana: A Glimpse of Self Realization. Selections from the original 1936 journal of Gajapathi Aiyyer. Open Sky Press ISBN 979-8865220305

=== Reminiscences ===
- Frank Humphreys, a British policeman stationed in India, visited Ramana Maharshi in 1911 and wrote articles about him which were first published in The International Psychic Gazette in 1913. (Note: See Frank H. Humphreys, Glimpses of the Life and Teachings of Bhagavan Sri Ramana Maharshi for Humphreys writings on Ramana Maharshi.)
- Paul Brunton (1935), A Search in Secret India. This book introduced Ramana Maharshi to a western audience.
- Cohen, S.S. (2003). Guru Ramana. Sri Ramanashram. First published 1956.
- Chadwick, Major A. W. (1961). A Sadhu's Reminiscences of Ramana Maharshi (PDF). Sri Ramanashram. Archived from the original (PDF) on 16 May 2018.
- Nagamma, Suri (1973). Letters from Ramanasram by Suri Nagamma. Tiruvannamalai: Sriramanasasram.
- Kunjuswami, Living with the Master. Recordings of Kunjuswami's experiences with Ramana Maharshi from 1920 on. ISBN 81-88018-99-6
- G. V. Subbaramayya, Sri Ramana Reminiscences. "The account covers the years between 1933 and 1950". (Note: sriramanamaharshi.org, Sri Ramana Reminiscences)

=== Documentaries ===
- A Day in the Life at Ramana Maharshi Ashram
- The Sage of Arunachala
- Abide as the Self: The Essential Teachings of Ramana Maharshi
- Talks on Sri Ramana Maharshi: Narrated by David Godman
- Who is Sri Ramana... Who am I?
- The Eternal Light
- Sri Ramana Maharshi – JNANI
- Arunachala Shiva – Teachings of Ramana Maharshi

== See also ==
- Spiritual crisis
- Nisargadatta Maharaj
- Vedanta Society

Books recommended by Ramana Maharshi

- Tripura Rahasya
- Yoga Vasishta Sara
- Advaita Bodha Deepika
- Ashtavakra Gita
- Ribhu Gita
- Dakshinamurti Stotra

== Sources ==
=== Printed sources ===
- Arulsamy, S. (1987), Saivism – A Perspective of Grace, New Delhi: Sterling Publishers
- Brunton, Paul (1994), A Search in Secret India, York Beach, Maine: Samuel Weiser
- Chapple, Christopher (1984), Introduction to "The Concise Yoga Vasistha", State University of New York
- Cohen, S.S. (1980), Memoirs and Notes, Tiruvannamalai: Sri Ramanasramam
- Cornille, Catherine (1992), The Guru in Indian Catholicism: Ambiguity Or Opportunity of Inculturation, Wm. B. Eerdmans Publishing
- Coomaraswamy, Rama P. (2004), The Essential Ananda K. Coomaraswamy, World Wisdom
- Dallapiccola, Anna (2002), Dictionary of Hindu Lore and Legend, National Geographic Books, ISBN 0-500-51088-1
- Davis, Leesa S. (2010), Advaita vedanta and Zen Buddhism. Deconstructive Modes of Spiritual Inquiry, Routledge
- Ebert, Gabriele (2006), Ramana Maharshi: His Life, Lulu.com
- Edwards, Alan (2012), Ramana Maharshi and the Colonial Encounter. Master Thesis, Victoria University of Wellington (PDF), Open Access Te Herenga Waka-Victoria University of Wellington, doi:10.26686/wgtn.16993645.v1
- Fields, Rick (1992), How The Swans Came to the Lake. A Narrative History of Buddhism in America, Shambhala
- Flood, Gavin D. (2011), "Miracles in Hinduism", in Twelftree, Graham H. (ed.), The Cambridge Companion to Miracles, Cambridge University Press
- Forman, Robert (1999), Mysticism, Mind, Consciousness, SUNY Press
- Forsthoefel, Thomas A. (2005), The Perennial Appeal of Ramana Maharshi. In: Thomas A. Forsthoefel, Cynthia Ann Humes (2005), Gurus In America, SUNY Press
- Fort, Andrew O. (1998), Jivanmukti in Transformation: Embodied Liberation in Advaita and Neo-Vedanta, SUNY Press
- Frawley, David (1996), Tantric Yoga and the Wisdom Goddesses: Spiritual Secrets of Ayurveda, Motilal Banarsidass
- Frawley, David (2000), Vedantic Meditation: Lighting the Flame of Awareness, North Atlantic Books
- Ganesan, V., Ramana Periya Puranam (PDF), Sri Ramanasraman
- Gilchrist, Cherry (1996), Theosophy. The Wisdom of the Ages, HarperSanFrancisco
- Godman, David (1985), Be As You Are (PDF), Penguin, ISBN 0-14-019062-7, archived from the original (PDF) on 29 December 2013
- Godman, David (1994), Living by the Words of Bhagavan, Tiruvannamalai: Sri Annamalai Swami Ashram Trust
- Godman, David (1998), Living by the Words of Bhagavan, Tiruvannamalai: Annamalai Swami Ashram
- Gombrich, Richard (1996), Theravada Buddhism. A Social History From Ancient Benares to Modern Colombo, Routledge
- Hinduism Today (2007), What Is Hinduism?: Modern Adventures into a Profound Global Faith, Himalayan Academy Publications
- Johnson, K. Paul (1994), The masters revealed: Madam Blavatsky and the myth of the Great White Lodge, SUNY Press, ISBN 0-7914-2063-9
- Jung, Carl G. (1948), De betekenis van de Indische Heilige. In: Heinrich Zimmer, "De weg tot het zelf", 's-Graveland: Uitgeverij De Driehoek
- King, Richard (1999), Orientalism and Religion: Post-Colonial Theory, India and "The Mystic East", Routledge
- Bhikshu, Krishna (2004) [1936], Sri Ramana Leela, Sri Ramanasramam
- Lavoie, Jeffrey D. (2012), The Theosophical Society: The History of a Spiritualist Movement, Universal-Publishers
- Lucas, Phillip Charles (November 2011), "When a Movement Is Not a Movement. Ramana Maharshi and Neo-Advaita in North America", Nova Religio: The Journal of Alternative and Emergent Religions, 15 (2): 93–114, doi:10.1525/nr.2011.15.2.93, JSTOR 10.1525/nr.2011.15.2.93
- Lucas, Phillip Charles (2014), "Non-Traditional Modern Advaita Gurus in the West and Their Traditional Modern Advaita Critics", Nova Religio: The Journal of Alternative and Emergent Religions, 17 (3): 6–37, doi:10.1525/nr.2014.17.3.6
- Maehle, Gregor (2007), Ashtanga Yoga: Practice and Philosophy, New World Library
- McMahan, David L. (2008), The Making of Buddhist Modernism, Oxford University Press, ISBN 978-0-19-518327-6
- Michaels, Axel (2004), Hinduism. Past and present, Princeton, New Jersey: Princeton University Press
- Mukerji, Mādhava Bithika (1983), Neo-Vedanta and Modernity, Ashutosh Prakashan Sansthan
- Muruganar (2017), David Godman (ed.), The Shining of my Lord: Selected verses from Sri Ramana Jnana Bodham and other Muruganar texts, translated by T.V. Venkatasubramanian; David Godman, Introduction by David Godman, Boulder, Colorado: Avadhuta Foundation, ISBN 978-0-9885285-4-3
- Narasimha, Swami (1993), Self Realisation: The Life and Teachings of Sri Ramana Maharshi, Sri Ramanasraman
- Natarajan, A. R. (2006), Timeless in Time: Sri Ramana Maharshi, World Wisdom
- Osborne, Arthur (2002) [1954], Ramana Maharshi and the Path of Self-Knowledge (PDF), Sri Ramanasramam
- Osborne, Arthur (1959), The Mind of Ramana Maharshi, Jaico Publishing House
- Paranjape, Makarand R. (2009), Another Canon: Indian Texts and Traditions in English, Anthem Press
- Poonja, Sri H. W. L. (2000), The Truth Is, Weiser Books
- Ramana Maharshi (1982), Who am I? (Nan Yar?) (PDF), Tiruvannamalai: Sriramanasasram, archived from the original (PDF) on 3 October 2012
- Rao, P. Rajeswar (1991), The Great Indian Patriots, Volume 2, Mittal Publications
- Renard, Philip (1999), Ramana Upanishad, Utrecht: Servire
- Sadhu Om (2005), The Path of Sri Ramana, Part One (PDF), Tiruvannamalai: Sri Ramana Kshetra, Kanvashrama
- Sadhu Om (2005b), The Path of Sri Ramana, Part Two (PDF), Tiruvannamalai: Sri Ramana Kshetra, Kanvashrama
- Sharma, Arvind (1993), The Experiential Dimension of Advaita Vedanta, Motilal Banarsidass Publishers
- Sharma, Arvind (2006), Ramana Maharshi: The Sage of Arunachala, Pinguin, Viking
- Sinari, Ramakant (2000), Advaita and Contemporary Indian Philosophy. In: Chattopadhyana (gen.ed.), "History of Science, Philosophy and Culture in Indian Civilization. Volume II Part 2: Advaita Vedanta", Delhi: Centre for Studies in Civilizations
- Singh, Sarina (2009), Lonely Planet, "South India"
- Sivaramkrishna, M. (2008), Sterling Book of Ramana Maharshi, Sterling Publishers Pvt. Ltd
- Sri Ramanasramam (1981), Bhagavan Sri Ramana: a pictorial biography, Sri Ramanasramam
- Thompson, Lewis (2011), Fathomless Heart: The Spiritual and Philosophical Reflections of an English Poet-Sage, North Atlantic Books
- Venkataramiah, Munagala (1936), Talks with Sri Ramana Maharshi, Tiruvannamalai: Sri Ramanasramam
- Venkataramiah, Muranagala (2000), Talks With Sri Ramana Maharshi: On Realizing Abiding Peace and Happiness, Inner Directions, ISBN 1-878019-00-7
- Venkataramiah, Muranagala (2006), Talks With Sri Ramana Maharshi (PDF), Sri Ramanasramam, archived from the original (PDF) on 5 July 2010
- Visvanathan, Susan (2010), The Children of Nature: The Life and Legacy of Ramana Maharshi. New Delhi: Roli/Lotus
- Wehr, Gerhard (2003), Jung and Steiner: The Birth of a New Psychology, SteinerBooks
- Williamson, Loal (2010), Transcendent in America: Hindu-Inspired Meditation Movements as New Religion, NYU Press
- Zimmer, Heinrich (1948), De weg tot het Zelf. Leer en leven van de Indische heilige, Sri Ramana Maharshi uit Tiruvannamalai [The way to the self] (in Dutch), 's Graveland: Uitgeverij De Driehoek
