= Mountain Path =

- Categories: Spirituality, religion, culture
- Frequency: Quarterly
- Publisher: Sri Ramanasramam
- First issue: 1964
- Country: India
- Language: English
- Website: Mountain Path
- ISSN: 0027-2574
- OCLC: 1774529

The Mountain Path is an English-language quarterly magazine published by Sri Ramanasramam, the ashram founded by the devotees of Sri Ramana Maharshi. Established in 1964, Arthur Osborne, a British devotee was the founding editor of the magazine. The magazine is also available as an app.

Published since 1964, it carries articles and translations by scholars and writers on various spiritual and cultural themes. After Osborne's death in 1970, his wife Lucia edited the magazine until it was taken over by Swami Viswanathan.
