= Paul Brunton =

British philosopher, author of spiritual books, journalist and traveler (1898-1981)

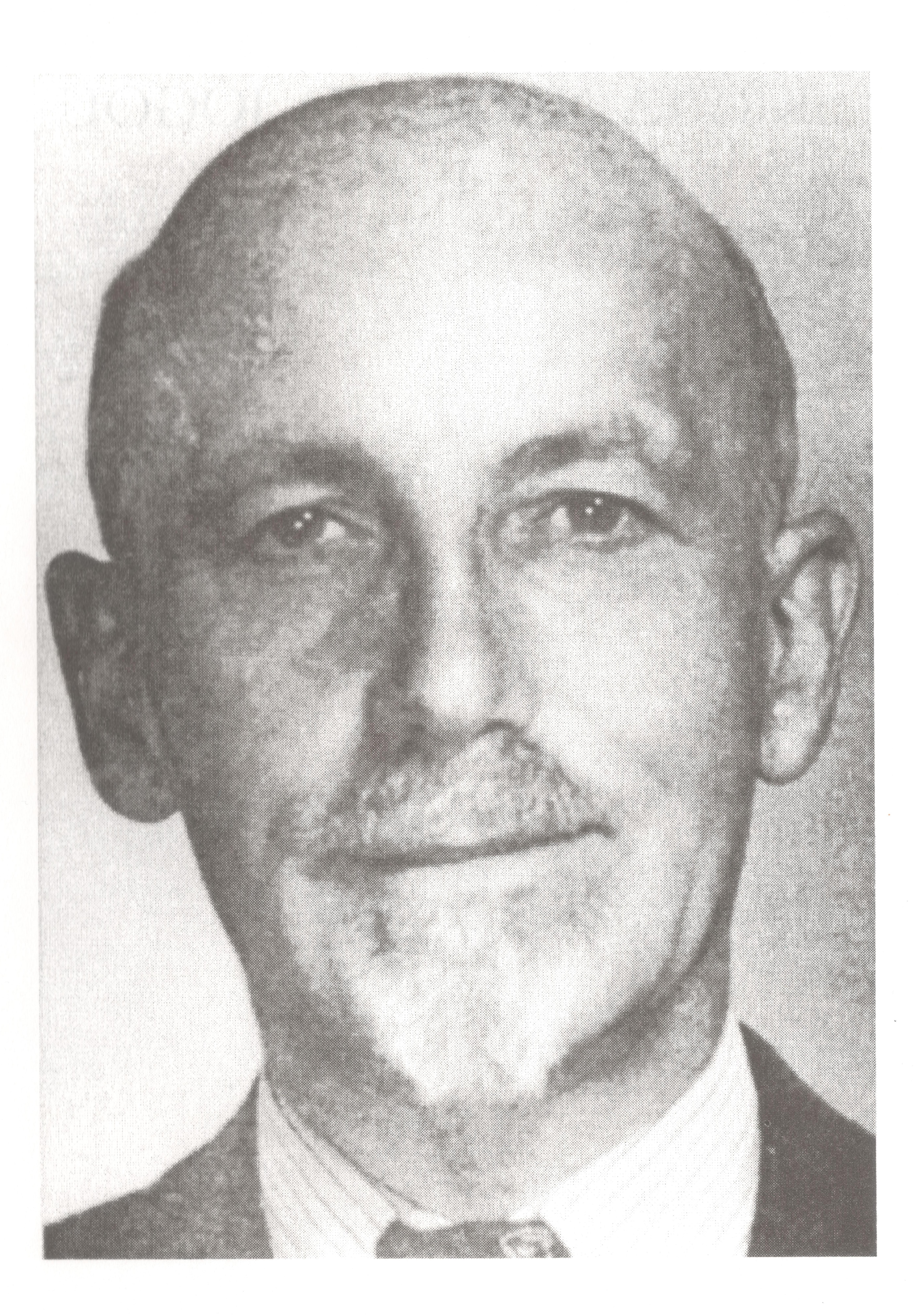
- Born: Hyman Abraham Isaacs; Hyman Raphael Hurst; October 21, 1898; London
- Died: July 27, 1981 (aged 82); Vevey
- Occupations: Author, Journalist, Bookseller
- Spouse(s): Karen Augusta Tuttrup (m. 1921; div. 1926) Janina ? (Brunton) (annulled) Evangeline Young (m. 1952, divorced)
- Children: Kenneth Thurston Hurst (b.1923)
- Parent(s): Reuben Isaac Hurst; Fanny Kosofsky
- Writing career
- Language: English
- Notable works: A Search in Secret India, The Inner Reality (in USA as Discover Yourself), The Spiritual Crisis of Man

Paul Brunton is the pen name and later the real name of Hyman Raphael Hurst (21 October 1898 – 27 July 1981), a British philosopher, author of spiritual books, journalist and traveler. He is best known as one of the early popularizers of Neo-Hindu spiritualism in western esotericism, notably via his bestselling A Search in Secret India (1934) which has been translated into over 20 languages.

Brunton was a proponent of a doctrine of Mentalism, or Oriental Mentalism to distinguish it from subjective idealism of the western tradition. Brunton expounds his doctrine of Mentalism in The Hidden Teaching Beyond Yoga (1941, new ed. 2015 North Atlantic Books), The Wisdom of the Overself (1943, new ed. 2015 North Atlantic Books) and in the posthumous publication of The Notebooks of Paul Brunton in 16 volumes (Larson Publications, 1984–88).

== Biography ==
Hurst was born in London in 1898 to a family of Jewish immigrants from Eastern Europe, and his original birth name was Hyman Abraham Isaacs. He grew up in the Cockney section of London. His mother died when he was thirteen and his father (occupation shoemaker) remarried. His stepmother brought the ideas of the Christian Science religious movement into the family. He was educated at the Central Foundation Boys' School, later at the St George's Colleage Central, London (St George's College for Civil Service and Secretarial Training, moved from King's College in 1909; located in Red Lion Square). He served in a tank division during the First World War, and later devoted himself to mysticism and came into contact with Theosophists. He married Karen Augusta Tuttrup in 1921, with whom he had a son, Kenneth Thurston Hurst (b. 1923). After his wife had an affair with his friend Leonard Gill, the marriage ended in divorce in 1926, but Hurst remained on friendly terms with his ex-wife and with Gill. He was a bookseller and journalist, and wrote under various pseudonyms, including Raphael Meriden and Raphael Delmonte. Being partner of an occult bookshop, The Atlantis Bookshop, in Bloomsbury, Hurst came into contact with both the literary and occult British intelligentsia of the 1920s.

In 1930, Hurst embarked on a voyage to India, which brought him into contact with Meher Baba, Vishuddhananda Paramahansa, Paramacharya of Kancheepuram and Ramana Maharshi. At the Paramacharya's insistence, he met Bhagavan Ramana Maharshi, which led to a turn of events culminating in revealing Ramana to the western world. Hurst's first visit to Sri Ramana's ashram took place in 1931. During this visit, Hurst was accompanied by a Buddhist bhikshu, formerly a military officer but meanwhile known as Swami Prajnananda, the founder of the English ashram in Rangoon. Hurst asked several questions, including "What is the way to God-realization?" and Maharshi said: "Vichara, asking yourself the 'Who am I?' enquiry into the nature of your Self."

Paul Brunton was the pseudonym under which A Search in Secret India was published in 1934. The book became a bestseller, and Hurst afterwards stuck to publishing under this name. He later made an official name change to Paul Brunton.

Brunton has been credited with introducing Ramana Maharshi to the West through his books A Search in Secret India and The Secret Path.

One day—sitting with Ramana Maharshi—Brunton had an experience which Steve Taylor names "an experience of genuine enlightenment which changed him forever". Brunton describes it in the following way:

I find myself outside the rim of world consciousness. The planet which has so far harboured me disappears. I am in the midst of an ocean of blazing light. The latter, I feel rather than think, is the primeval stuff out of which worlds are created, the first state of matter. It stretches away into untellable infinite space, incredibly alive.

Brunton was in India during World War II, as a guest of the Maharaja of Mysore, Krishna Raja Wadiyar IV. He dedicated his book The Quest of the Overself to the Maharaja and when the Maharaja died in 1940, he was present at his funeral.

Brunton commented on Mahatma Gandhi and the Indian independence movement:

"I discover, too, that he has not yet succumbed to the hysteria for politics which has attacked most of the young students in the towns, though India is now in the throes of the long turmoil which Gandhi has aroused into being in his effort to disturb the relations between white rulers and brown ruled."

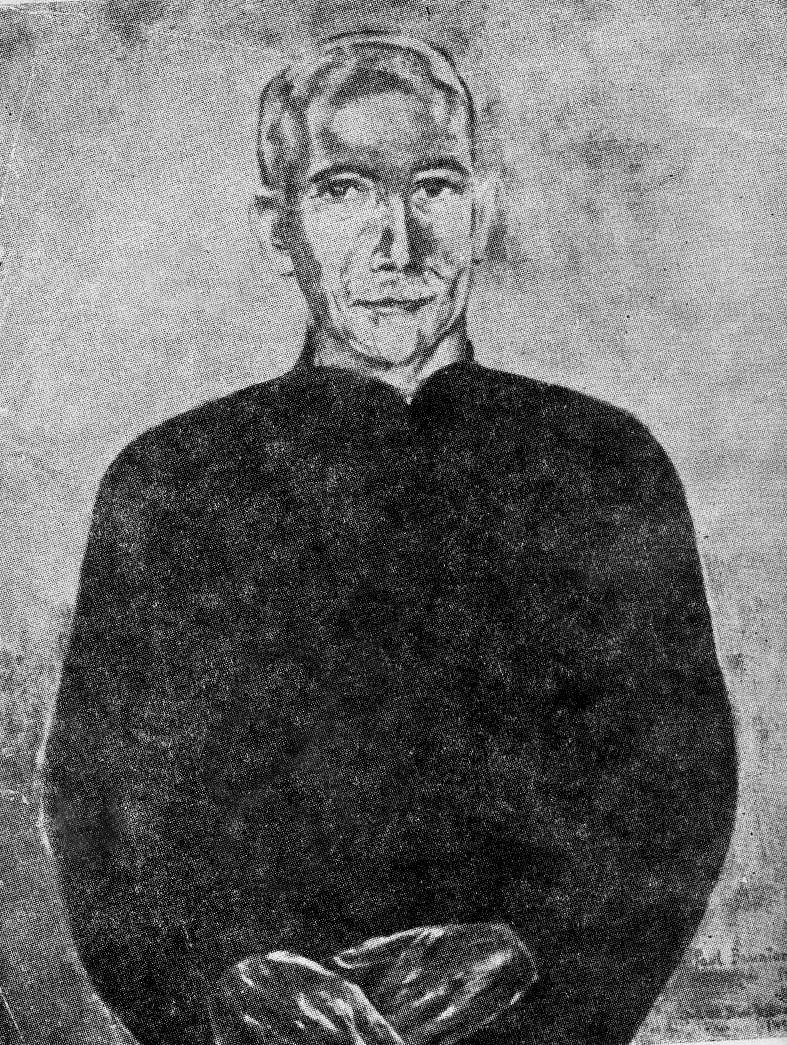
A portrait of Paul Brunton

In the 1940s and 1950s, Brunton occasionally stayed as a guest, for a few weeks at a time, about six months total, with the parents of controversial American author and former psychoanalyst Jeffrey Masson. In 1956, Brunton decided that a third world war was imminent and the Massons moved to Montevideo, since this location was considered safe. From Uruguay, Masson went with Brunton's encouragement to study Sanskrit at Harvard. Brunton himself did not move to South America, instead spending some time living in New Zealand. In 1993, Masson wrote a critical account of Brunton titled My Father's Guru: A Journey Through Spirituality and Disillusion.

In the 1950s, Brunton retired from publishing books and devoted himself to writing essays and notes. Upon his death in 1981 in Vevey, Switzerland, it was noted that in the period since the last published book in 1952, he had rendered about 20,000 pages of philosophical writing.

A longtime friend of Brunton's, philosopher Anthony Damiani, founded Wisdom's Goldenrod Center for Philosophic Studies in 1972. Swedish publisher Robert Larson helped to start Larson Publications (USA) which completed the publication of the 16-volume set of The Notebooks of Paul Brunton in 1988. Brunton's son Kenneth Hurst helped form the Paul Brunton Philosophic Foundation which continues to publish and archive Paul Brunton's literary legacy (the physical archive is now located in the Cornell University Library).

== Personal life ==
Brunton was a vegan for ethical and spiritual reasons. Early in his life he was interested in occultism and regularly contributed to the Occult Review, attended Theosophical Society meetings in London and joined the Spiritualist Association of Great Britain.

== Bibliography ==
=== Books ===
- A Search in Secret India (1934)
- The Secret Path (1935)
- A Search in Secret Egypt (1936)
- A Message from Arunachala (1936)
- A Hermit in the Himalayas (1936)
- The Quest of the Overself (1937)
- Indian Philosophy and Modern Culture (1939)
- The Inner Reality (1939) [published in the US as Discover Yourself, same year]
- The Hidden Teaching Beyond Yoga (1941)
- Wisdom of the Overself (1943)
- Spiritual Crisis of Man (1952)

=== Miscellaneous ===
- Brunton, Paul. 1975. "A Living Sage of South India" in The Sage of Kanchi, New Delhi: Arnold-Heinemann, New Delhi. ed by T.M.P. Mahadevan, chapter 2
- Brunton, Paul. 1959, 1987. Introduction to Fundamentals of Yoga, by Rammurti S. Mishra, M.D. New York; Harmony Books
- Brunton, Paul. 1937. "Western Thought and Eastern Culture", article, The Cornhill Magazine
- Brunton, Paul. 1951. Introduction to Wood, Ernest Practical Yoga London: Rider
- Plus articles in Success Magazine, Occult Review, and The Aryan Path

=== Posthumously published texts ===
- The Notebooks of Paul Brunton 16 Volumes of posthumous writings (1984-1988)
  - Perspectives (Volume 1)
  - The Quest (Volume 2)
  - Practices for the Quest / Relax and Retreat (Volume 3)
  - Meditation (Volume 4, Part 1)
  - The Body (Volume 4, Part 2)
  - Emotions and Ethics / The Intellect (Volume 5)
  - The Ego / From Birth to Rebirth (Volume 6)
  - Healing of the Self / The Negatives (Volume 7)
  - Reflections on My Life and Writings (Volume 8)
  - Human Experience / The Arts in Culture (Volume 9)
  - The Orient: Its Legacy to the West (Volume 10)
  - The Sensitives (Volume 11)
  - The Religious Urge / Reverential Life (Volume 12)
  - Relativity, Philosophy, and Mind (Volume 13)
  - Inspiration and the Overself (Volume 14)
  - Advanced Contemplation / The Peace within (Volume 15)
  - Enlightened Mind, Divine Mind (Volume 16)
- Essays on the Quest (1984)
- Essential Readings (1990)
- Conscious Immortality
- Instructions for Spiritual Living (2019)
- Realizing Soul: From Intuition to an Inspired Life (2015)
- The Short Path to Enlightenment (2014)
- Meditations for People in Charge (1995)
- Meditations for People in Crisis (1996)
- What Is Karma (1998)
- The Gift of Grace (2011)
