= 1871 Paris Commune elections =

Revolutionary city council elections

- March 26, 1871
- Registered: 484,569
- Turnout: 48%

The Paris Commune of 1871 was established on March 26, 1871, following elections held by the Central Committee of the National Guard. This revolutionary government was inspired by the earlier Paris Commune of 1792 and realized the aspirations of the social movement. The Commune saw the formation of an assembly representing all republican factions of the era, though the more moderate members soon left, leaving control to the more radical elements who drew upon Jacobinism, Blanquism, socialism, and anarchism. The elected members served on the Commune Council.

== Context ==
After the events of March 18 and the withdrawal of legal authorities to Versailles, the Central Committee of the National Guard assumed control in the capital. Surprised by their easy victory and reluctant to take on the political responsibilities of the situation, the Central Committee quickly decided to organize new municipal elections, initially scheduled for March 22.

However, the date had to be postponed to March 23 and then to March 26 due to two events:

- Firstly, efforts at conciliation by district mayors and Parisian elected officials (including Clemenceau, Millière, Tolain, Cournet, Lockroy, and Malon) who were attempting to avoid a confrontation between the National Assembly and the National Guard.
- Secondly, the demonstrations on March 21 and 22 by the "party of order" and the occupation of certain district town halls by bourgeois battalions of the National Guard.

== Elections ==
A total of 92 councillor positions were up for election, with each district receiving one councilor per 20,000 inhabitants and an additional councilor for any fraction exceeding 10,000. The distribution was as follows:

- 2 for the 16th arrondissement
- 3 for the 14th and 15th arrondissements
- 4 for the 1st, 2nd, 7th, 8th, 12th, 13th, 19th, and 20th arrondissements
- 5 for the 3rd, 4th, 5th, 6th, 9th, and 17th arrondissements
- 6 for the 10th arrondissement
- 7 for the 11th and 18th arrondissements

The campaign was brief, with three main factions dividing public opinion. The government supporters advocated for abstention, the conciliators backed the moderate candidacies of current mayors or their deputies, and the Commune party included the Central Committee of the National Guard, the Central Republican Committee of the Twenty Arrondissements, and the Internationalists. Reports consistently indicated that the voting process proceeded calmly and without coercion in most areas.

=== Results ===
Paris had 484,569 registered voters at the time. The number of participants was 229,167, resulting in an abstention rate of 52%, which is comparable to the 1870 municipal elections. Participation was significantly higher in the eastern and northern parts of Paris than in the affluent western districts.

The election of six candidates who were poised to be elected but did not reach the 12.5% threshold of registered voters was validated. These candidates were Brunel, Langevin, Rigault, Vaillant, Arnould, and Allix. Six seats remained vacant due to multiple elections benefiting the same candidate, plus the seat allotted to Blanqui, who was still in prison.

The revolutionary majority included at least 60 councilors (15 of whom belonged to the Central Committee of the National Guard). The moderate minority was represented by 16 members of the mayor's party and 4 radicals. There was also a notable presence of around fifteen members of the Internationalists. Clemenceau was defeated in the 18th arrondissement, receiving only 752 votes out of 17,443 voters.

The Commune Council was quickly reduced to 62 members following the collective resignation of the mayor's party, the subsequent resignation of the radicals, and the deaths of Gustave Flourens and Duval, who were executed by the Versaillais after the first battles in April.

On March 28, during a large public demonstration at the Place de l'Hôtel-de-Ville, the Central Committee of the National Guard handed over the powers it had held for the past ten days to the newly elected officials. However, the National Guard continued to exercise parallel authority, particularly in military operations.

=== Supplementary elections ===
Initially scheduled for April 5, the supplementary elections, intended to fill vacant or abandoned seats, were held on April 16, 1871. An additional seat was allocated to the 20th arrondissement following a revision of its population count. 32 councilors were to be elected, but there were few candidates, and the abstention rate exceeded 80%. Under these circumstances, only 14 seats were filled, bringing the total number of councilors to 79 out of 93 seats.

The results of the supplementary elections on April 16 were published in the Journal officiel on April 20, 1871.

The following month, the Commune fell during the Semaine sanglante.

== Elected officials ==
Elected member	Constituency	Political affiliation
Pierre Vésinier	1st arrondissement	Internationalist, Jacobinist
Gustave Paul Cluseret	1st arrondissement	Internationalist
Adolphe Adam	1st arrondissement	
Jean-Jacques Pillot	1st arrondissement	Blanquist, Internationalist
Jules Andrieu	1st arrondissement	Internationalist
Jules Méline	1st arrondissement	
Auguste Serraillier	2nd arrondissement	Internationalist
Pierre Tirard	2nd arrondissement	
Charles Loiseau-Pinson	2nd arrondissement	
Eugene Pottier	2nd arrondissement	Internationalist, Jacobinist
Jacques Louis Durand	2nd arrondissement	Internationalist, Jacobinist
Jules-Paul Johannard	2nd arrondissement	Internationalist, Jacobinist
Ernest Brelay	2nd arrondissement	
Antoine Demay	3rd arrondissement	Internationalist, Jacobinist
Armand Antoine Jules Arnaud	3rd arrondissement	Internationalist, Jacobinist
Charles Murat	3rd arrondissement	
Clovis Dupont	3rd arrondissement	Internationalist, Jacobinist
Jean-Louis Pindy	3rd arrondissement	Internationalist
Arthur Arnould	4th arrondissement	Internationalist
Charles Amouroux	4th arrondissement	Internationalist
Eugene Gérardin	4th arrondissement	Internationalist
Gustave Lefrançais	4th arrondissement	Internationalist
Dominique Régère	5th arrondissement	Jacobinist
Gustave Tridon	5th arrondissement	Blanquist
Charles Ledroit	5th arrondissement	Jacobinist
François Jourde	5th arrondissement	
Stanislas Xavier Pourille	5th arrondissement	Jacobinist
Louis-Augustin Rogeard	6th arrondissement	
Albert Leroy	6th arrondissement	
Charles Beslay	6th arrondissement	Internationalist
Edmond-Alfred Goupy	6th arrondissement	
Gustave Courbet	6th arrondissement	
Eugène Varlin	6th arrondissement	Internationalist
Arthur Arnould	7th arrondissement	Internationalist
Auguste Sicard	7th arrondissement	Jacobinist
Raoul Rigault	7th arrondissement	Blanquist
Raoul Urbain	7th arrondissement	Jacobinist
Ernest Lefèvre	7th arrondissement	
François-Louis Parisel	7th arrondissement	Jacobinist
Paul Antoine Brunel	7th arrondissement	
Édouard Vaillant	8th arrondissement	Internationalist
Jean-François Robinet	8th arrondissement	
Jules Allix	8th arrondissement	
Arthur Ranc	9th arrondissement	
Auguste Briosne	9th arrondissement	
Emile Ferry	9th arrondissement	
Ernest Desmarest	9th arrondissement	
François-Charles Ostyn	9th arrondissement	Internationalist
Gustave Nast	9th arrondissement	
Ulysse Parent	9th arrondissement	
Felix Pyat	10th arrondissement	Jacobinist
Paul Philémon Rastoul	10th arrondissement	Jacobinist
Charles Ferdinand Gambon	10th arrondissement	Jacobinist
Fortunate Henry	10th arrondissement	Internationalist, Jacobinist
Henry Louis Champy	10th arrondissement	Jacobinist
Jules-Nicolas-André Babick	10th arrondissement	Internationalist
Augustin Verdure	11th arrondissement	Internationalist
Charles Delescluze	11th arrondissement	Jacobinist
Adolphe Assi	11th arrondissement	
Augustin Avrial	11th arrondissement	Internationalist
Emile Eudes	11th arrondissement	Blanquist
Eugene Protot	11th arrondissement	Blanquist
Henri Mortier	11th arrondissement	Blanquist
Jean-Baptiste-Hubert Geresme	11th arrondissement	
Albert Theisz	12th arrondissement	Internationalist
Alphonse Lonclas	12th arrondissement	Jacobinist
Jean Fenouillas	12th arrondissement	Jacobinist
Julien Fruneau	12th arrondissement	
Eugène Varlin	12th arrondissement	Internationalist
Émile-Victor Duval	13th arrondissement	Blanquist, Internationalist
Jean-Baptiste Chardon	13th arrondissement	Blanquist
Leo Frankel	13th arrondissement	Internationalist
Leo Melliet	13th arrondissement	
Adolphe Clemence	14th arrondissement	Internationalist
Alfred-Édouard Billioray	14th arrondissement	
Baptiste Descamps	14th arrondissement	Jacobinist
Jules Martelet	14th arrondissement	Internationalist, Jacobinist
Jules Valles	15th arrondissement	
Camille Langevin	15th arrondissement	Internationalist
Victor Clément	15th arrondissement	Internationalist
Charles Longuet	16th arrondissement	Internationalist
Henri Marmottan	16th arrondissement	
Jehan de Bouteiller	16th arrondissement	
Benoit Malon	17th arrondissement	Internationalist
Charles Gérardin	17th arrondissement	Jacobinist
Émile Léopold Clément	17th arrondissement	Internationalist
Jean-Martial-Aminthe Dupont	17th arrondissement	Jacobinist
Louis-Denis Chalain	17th arrondissement	Internationalist
Albert Theisz	17th arrondissement	Internationalist
Eugène Varlin	17th arrondissement	Internationalist
Auguste Vermorel	18th arrondissement	
Georges Arnold	18th arrondissement	
Jean-Baptiste Clément	18th arrondissement	Internationalist, Jacobinist
Louis-Simon Dereure	18th arrondissement	Internationalist
Paschal Grousset	18th arrondissement	Jacobinist
Théophile Ferré	18th arrondissement	Blanquist
Gustave Paul Cluseret	18th arrondissement	
Emile Oudet	19th arrondissement	Jacobinist
Ernest Puget	19th arrondissement	Jacobinist
Frédéric Cournet	19th arrondissement	
Jules Miot	19th arrondissement	Internationalist, Jacobinist
Charles Delescluze	19th arrondissement	Jacobinist
Alexis Louis Trinquet	20th arrondissement	Blanquist, Internationalist
Auguste Viard	20th arrondissement	Jacobinist
Gabriel Ranvier	20th arrondissement	Blanquist
Gustave Flourens	20th arrondissement	Jacobinist
Jules-Henri-Marius Bergeret	20th arrondissement	Internationalist, Jacobinist
Louis Auguste Blanqui	20th arrondissement	Blanquist
