= Mouni Sadhu =

Polish-Australian author (1897–1971)

- Born: 17 August 1897; Warsaw, Poland
- Died: 24 December 1971 (aged 74); Melbourne, Australia
- Occupation: Author
- Years active: 1952–1967
- Known for: Writings on spirituality, meditation, occultism and self‑realisation
- Notable work: In Days of Great Peace

Mouni Sadhu (17 August 1897 – 24 December 1971) was a Polish-born author whose name is Mieczysław Demetriusz Sudowski. He wrote about Western and Eastern spirituality, occultism, Hermeticism and Yoga traditions in India. Ramana Maharshi is known as his greatest personal influence. The name "Mouni Sadhu" is commonly translated as "silent monk" in Sanskrit.

== Early life and education ==
Information about Sadhu's early life is limited. Different commentators have presented conflicting accounts of his early life.

On several occasions, he stated that he felt it was his "spiritual master" who was directing his pen and the spiritual messages found in his work.

== Career ==
At the age of 25, he became interested in Theosophy. He corresponded with Annie Besant and Charles Webster Leadbeater.

=== Travels ===
Traveling to Paris in 1935, Mouni Sadhu visited the headquarters of the Association of Spiritual Friendships (Amitiés Spirituelles), founded by Paul Sédir. Mouni Sadhu's last book, published in 1967, was an English translation of Paul Sédir's French book Initiations. In the foreword to the translation, he stated that the author's descriptions of the mysterious places in northeastern France are based on personal experiences.

Between 1946 and 1948, Mouni Sadhu lived in Brazil before emigrating to Australia. During this time, he was involved in the Arunachala Group. His booklet Quem Sou Eu is a Portuguese translation of notes he had typed himself. He arrived in Sydney on 17 September 1948 and later settled in Melbourne, which remained his primary residence for the rest of his life. In 1949, he visited India after receiving an invitation to stay at Sri Ramanasramam, and he later described the experience in In Days of Great Peace. He returned to Australia on the 23 September 1949, and in a 1953 naturalisation application, he stated that he had lived continuously in Melbourne and worked as an electrical mechanic for the Melbourne City Council, with part-time writing as an additional occupation.

== Esoteric involvement ==
While in Europe, from 1926 to 1933, Mouni Sadhu belonged to an order of Rosicrucian Hermetists and published several articles on Tarot Hermetic philosophy and spirituality. Some believe that Mouni Sadhu reverted from spirituality back to occultism and that he was "obsessed with occultism" in his books, though this assertion is disputable.

Mouni Sadhu often referred to occult theories in his works, such as in the third chapter of Samadhi, "Occult Theories about the Higher Worlds,".

He elaborated further on his conception of both occultism and spirituality in the foreword to his book Ways to Self‑Realization: A Modern Evaluation of Occultism and Spiritual Paths, where he wrote: "Occultism is neither a synonymous term nor a substitute for spirituality, and spiritual men do not necessarily come from the ranks of occultists. They are two different things."

Mouni Sadhu often used the term "occult psychology," referring to aspects of the developing field of modern psychology. He refers the reader to William James's Varieties of Religious Experience several times.

In his preface to Concentration, Mouni Sadhu introduced the works of Yogi Ramacharaka and Yoga. He then dedicated Part I of Ways to Self‑Realization to William Walker Atkinson, with subsequent parts dedicated to Sri Ramana Maharshi, Paul Sédir, Dr Brandler‑Pracht and Dr Gérard Encausse (Papus).

In Chapter IX of Concentration, Mouni Sadhu states: "Perhaps in no other subdivision of human knowledge does there reign such disorder or lack of a system as in occult problems." In chapter XX of Ways to Self‑Realization, entitled "Maha Yoga and Its Value for the World," he wrote that the multiplicity of Yoga teachings demonstrates that none contains the fullness of Truth, and that "the Direct Path, also called Maha Yoga... as taught by the Maharishi" transcends all systems. He continued, "It became evident in this time of innumerable sects, religions, and philosophic and occult systems that a synthesis was urgently needed."

== Spirituality ==
In 1949, Mouni Sadhu spent several months at the ashram of Ramana Maharshi (Sri Ramanasramam) in Tiruvannamalai, situated at the foot of the sacred mountain Arunachala in South India, worshipped since ancient times as the physical manifestation of Siva. He had spent the years since 1946 pursuing the quest of the Self (Overself) as taught by the Maharshi. Combined with his earlier inner striving, this prepared him to sit at the feet of the Great Rishi, whose life and teaching he regarded as those of a genuine spiritual master for the modern world. He describes his experiences in In Days of Great Peace, where he recounts attaining nirvikalpa samadhi. In all of his subsequent books, he paid tribute to Ramana Maharshi, describing him as "the last Great Rishis of India" and "the modern Great Rishi of India."

=== Mystic trilogy ===
Mouni Sadhu's first three books form what he calls his Mystic Trilogy. In the foreword to his last book (excluding Initiations, which was a translation), Meditation: An Outline for Practical Study, he describes its relationship to Concentration and Samadhi, writing: "the present work is like a continuation of the two just mentioned, and I am writing on the assumption that its two forerunners are well known to you. It would be impossible to repeat in Meditation the material previously expounded in other books."

=== 1967 letter to Thomas Merton ===
In a letter to Thomas Merton in 1967, requesting him as a spiritual brother to consider writing a foreword to a planned book to be published as Contemplation: An Outline for Practical Study. Thomas Merton was not in a position to accept the offer, and the book was not published. It was Mouni Sadhu's translation of Initiations that became his last published work.

== In Days of Great Peace ==
=== Influences ===
Mouni Sadhu highly appreciated The Imitation of Christ and the Vivekachudamani ("Crest Jewel of Wisdom") of Sri Shankaracharya (Adi Sankara), the classic treatise of Advaita Vedanta, both of which he quoted extensively in his first published booklet Quem Sou Eu ("Who am I?"), published in Curitiba, Brazil, in 1948. He continued to quote both works throughout his books, particularly as themes for meditation. Around this time, he came into contact with the head of the Ramakrishna Mission in Paris, the eminent Swami Siddheswarananda.

== See also ==
- Mooji
- H. W. L. Poonja

== Bibliography ==
His literary estate was left to the Australian Society of Authors, of which he was a member.

- Quem Sou Eu? (Who am I?) – 1948
- In Days of Great Peace – At the Feet of Sri Ramana Maharshi: Diary Leaves from India – first published 1952, Ramnarayan Press, Bangalore
- In Days of Great Peace – The Highest Yoga as Lived – 2nd ed., revised and enlarged, 1957, George Allen and Unwin
- Concentration: A Guide to Mental Mastery – 1959 (USA), Harper and Brothers, New York; published in Great Britain as Concentration: An Outline for Practical Study – 1959, George Allen and Unwin
- Ways to Self‑Realization: A Modern Evaluation of Occultism and Spiritual Paths – 1962 (USA), The Julian Press; 1963 (Great Britain), George Allen and Unwin
- Samadhi: The Superconsciousness of the Future – 1962, George Allen and Unwin
- The Tarot: A Contemporary Course on the Quintessence of Hermetic Occultism – 1962
- Theurgy: The Art of Effective Worship – 1965
- Meditation: An Outline for Practical Study – 1967
- Initiations by Paul Sédir; translated from the French by Mouni Sadhu – 1967
