= Commune Council =

Commune Council may refer to:

- Commune Council (Cambodia)
- Commune Council (Paris), government during the 72-day Paris Commune in 1871
