= Pierre Winter =

French doctor and hygienist

- Born: 29 June 1891; Asnières, Hauts-de-Seine
- Died: 29 June 1952 (aged 61); Boulogne-Billancourt, Hauts-de-Seine
- Occupations: Doctor and hygienist

Pierre Winter (29 June 1891 – 29 June 1952) was a French doctor and hygienist.

== Life ==
Pierre-André-Eugène Winter was born on 29 June 1891 in Asnières, Hauts-de-Seine. His father was Charles-Pierre Winter, a publicist and old collaborator of Georges Clemenceau, and his mother was Marie-Armande Duclois. He attended the lycée Charlemagne, and then was admitted to the Faculty of Medicine in Paris. In 1911 he was an extern of the Paris hospitals. During World War I he was adjutant to the 46th battalion of Chasseurs Alpins. He was awarded the Croix de Guerre and the Legion of Honour.

In 1919 Winter became an intern in the Paris hospitals, and the next year became assistant to Dr. Clovis Vincent at the Pitié-Salpêtrière Hospital. In 1925 he was named head of the oto-rhino-pharyngology clinic at the Paris faculty of medicine. He was also a founder of the center of medical diagnosis. Starting in the 1920s, as well as writing in the Gazette Médicale he contributed to various reviews including L'Esprit Nouveau (1920–1925). In 1921 he met Le Corbusier, and became the architect's friend and supporter.

The right-wing Faisceau party was formed by Georges Valois in 1925 and began to break up the next year. Winter joined the Faisceau. In 1928 Winter and the lawyer Philippe Lamour (1903–1992), who had been expelled from the Faisceau, formed the Revolutionary Fascist party. They then formed the Plans group with the financial assistance of Jeanne Walter, wife of the wealthy architect Jean Walter. Several of the leaders of Plans had been followers of Georges Valois. Winter was a member of the editorial board of the avant-guarde urban planning journal Plans (1930–1932). Later he was one of the editors of Prelude (1932–1936), with Francois Pierrefeu (1891–1959), Hubert Lagardelle and Le Corbusier.

Winter became a member of the international congress of modern architecture and president of the hygiene section of the assembly of constructors for an architectural renewal. During World War II, Winter and Marcel Martiny were appointed to the permanent committee on occupational medicine that was created in 1941. He died at Boulogne-Billancourt, Hauts-de-Seine, on 29 June 1952.

== Views ==
Winter advocated a national health program. He was against existing urban conditions, as was Le Corbusier. In an article in Valois's weekly Nouveau Siècle he described them as dirty, ugly, over-crowded and quickly deteriorating, lacking light, air and hygiene. He argued for healthy modern homes with open space and greenery for workers and their families. In the same paper he promoted the Plan Voisin for the reconstruction of Paris proposed by Le Corbusier. The fascist new order and Le Corbusier's new city were seen as complementary concepts. Writing in September 1926 Winter noted that Le Corbusier's use of reinforced concrete freed him from the constraints of old materials and concepts. His new architecture, with its pure lines, planes and volumes was a precursor of the fascist revolution.

Some commentators see Winter's language as carrying racist concerns when he quoted Le Corbusier as saying urban congestion created a "zone of odours, [a] terrible and suffocating zone comparable to a field of gypsies crammed in their caravans amidst disorder and improvisation." He failed to mention Le Corbusier's views on how social structure and class relations should be managed. Sport was important to Winter as a remedy to problems of the machine age. In a modern urban environment, sport let man continue the activity of the outdoor life for which his body was designed. In this area, Winter came close to the concepts of the "biological man" and eugenics. Praising Le Corbusier's modern dwellings, Winter said, "useless remains are disposed of, life leaves no traces, it does not hoard its waste products, does to wallow in dirt and disease."

Winter became interested in homeopathy, and in particular in acupuncture and Chinese medicine as practiced in France. He contributed the chapter on the Middle Ages to Laignel-Lavastines Histoire générale de la médecine (1938). In this he said that the sacred and profane sciences, for a long time considered part of a single body of knowledge, could be reunited. Medicine was a natural area in which this synthesis could occur. He was one of the closest in the French medical community to the philosopher René Guénon, and in 1938 created the Groupe d'études métaphysiques, inspired by Guénon.

After the war, he founded the Groupe d'études des techniques mystiques et du yoga in 1946. This was very different from the Groupe d'études Métaphysiques, focused on medicine rather than on broader intellectual topics. Boris and Françoise Dolto were notable members. Winter carried on correspondence with the Swami Siddheshwarananda and the Orthodox father Kovalevsky. After his death on 1952 his group began to be called the Groupe Winter.

== Publications ==
- Winter, Pierre-André (1925). Les laryngectomies économiques: chirurgie du larynx "à la demande des lésions". Faculté de médecine de Paris.
- Winter, Pierre (1938). La Médecine Au Moyen Âge.
- Le Corbusier; Trochu, Charles; Winter, Pierre; Paul Boulard (1942). Architecture et urbanisme: Charles Trochu, Dr Pierre Winter, Le Corbusier, Paul Boulard... Les Publications techniques, Galerie Charpentier (Impr. centrale de la Presse).
