= Municipal Council of Paris =

Former assembly of Paris

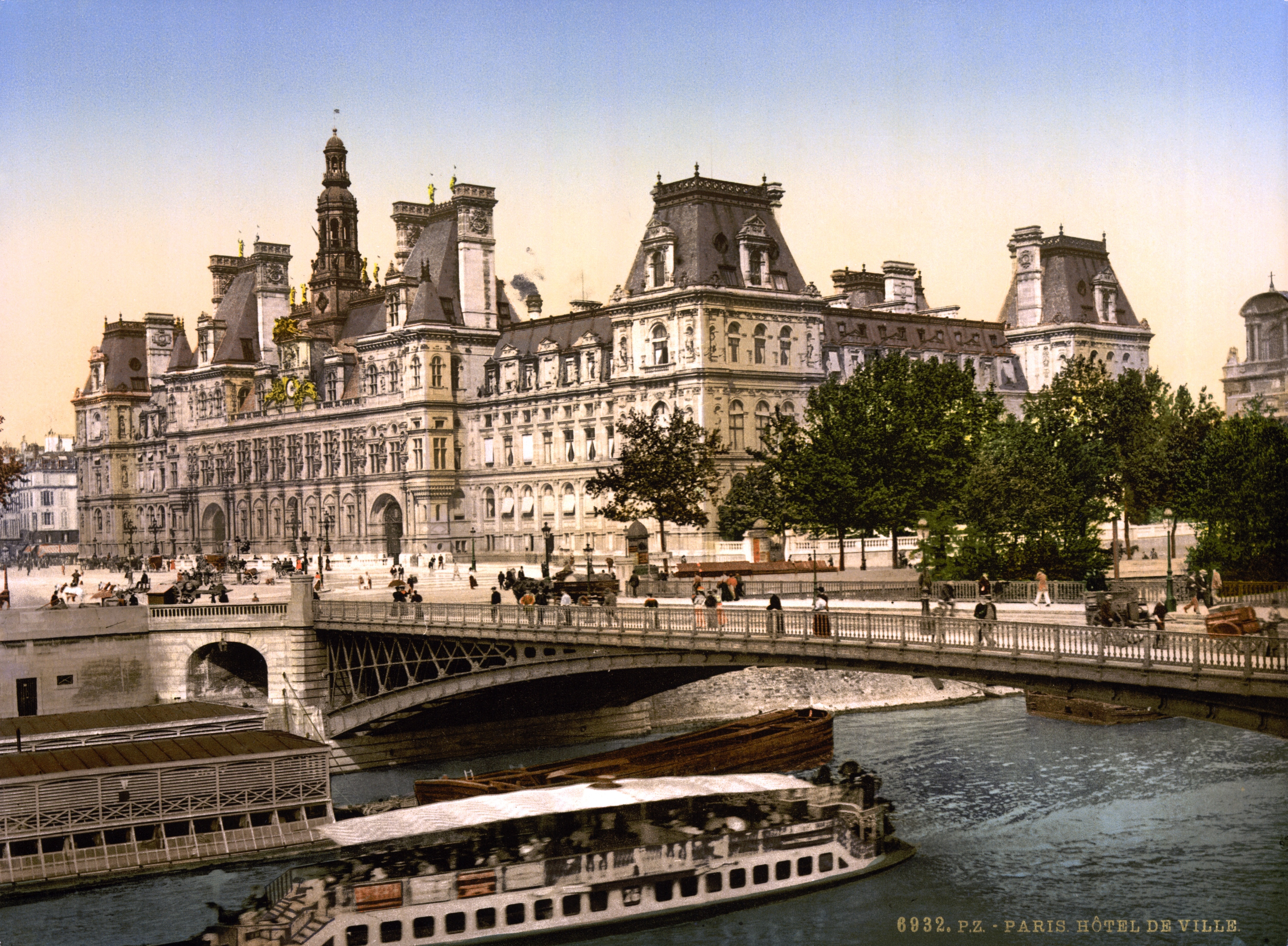
- City Hall in Paris around 1900.
- Dissolved: December 31, 1967
- Types: Municipal council in France
- Country: France
- Chief Executives: President of the Paris city council

The Municipal Council of Paris was the deliberative assembly of the city of Paris from April 20, 1834, to December 31, 1967, (Note: Except for the period between July 1848 and May 1855, when the municipal council was replaced by the Paris Municipal Commission.) when Paris was a commune within the department of the Seine. It was replaced on January 1, 1968, by the Council of Paris, which combined the functions of both the municipal council and the general council.

== From 1834 to 1871 ==
The first true Municipal Council of Paris was created by the law of April 20, 1834, separating the Municipal Council of Paris from the General Council of the Seine. The thirty-six general councilors of the Seine, elected by census suffrage in the Former arrondissements of Paris, automatically became members of this new assembly.

However, the council had limited power, as the Prefect of the Seine and the Prefect of Police held most of the mayoral functions. Additionally, the king appointed the president and vice-president of the municipal council annually from among the council members. The council could only meet when summoned by the prefect and deliberated only on matters submitted by the prefecture.

During the French Revolution of 1848, which took place in Paris from February 22 to 25, 1848, the position of Mayor of Paris was briefly reinstated. However, following the June Days Uprising of 1848, the state and its two prefects regained control of the city's executive power. On July 8, 1848, a provisional municipal and departmental commission was appointed with 36 members for both the Department of the Seine and the city of Paris, abolishing the mayoralty once again. By decree, this provisional commission was replaced on September 8, 1849, by two commissions: a departmental commission of the Seine with 44 members and a municipal commission composed of 36 members chosen from the departmental commission to govern Paris.

Due to fear of a revolutionary Paris, the government placed the city under state supervision, granting it a special administrative status that avoided universal suffrage, which had been extended to all other French municipalities under the decree of July 3, 1848. Napoleon III maintained this system, wary of capital with strong republican sympathies, especially after Paris attempted to revolt against his coup d'état of December 2, 1851. The May 5, 1855 law restored the name Municipal Council of Paris. However, the then Prefect of the Seine, Baron Haussmann, opposed the election of the municipal council, believing that the state should intervene directly and that the council should only assist the prefectural administration. The council, composed mainly of notables, met weekly for sessions lasting less than two hours. With the expansion of Paris in 1860 and the annexation of peripheral communes, the number of appointed councilors increased from 36 to 60.

Opposing this state control, Republicans Jules Ferry, Léon Gambetta, and Étienne Arago introduced a bill in February 1870 to give the Paris Municipal Council the same powers as other municipal councils. In response, the Ollivier government appointed a commission to draft a reform proposal in April 1870, which included the municipal council election by universal suffrage. However, the project failed with the fall of the Second Empire.

Following the proclamation of the Third Republic, the position of Mayor of Paris was reinstated on September 4, 1870. However, the Paris Commune uprising led to the mayor, Jules Ferry, fleeing, prompting new municipal elections.

== The Paris Commune ==
During the Siege of Paris, the Central Committee of the National Guard took control of the city and organized new municipal elections. On March 26, 1871, 92 municipal council seats were contested, with the revolutionaries winning the majority and proclaiming the Paris Commune. The Commune was brutally suppressed two months later.

== From 1871 to 1914 ==
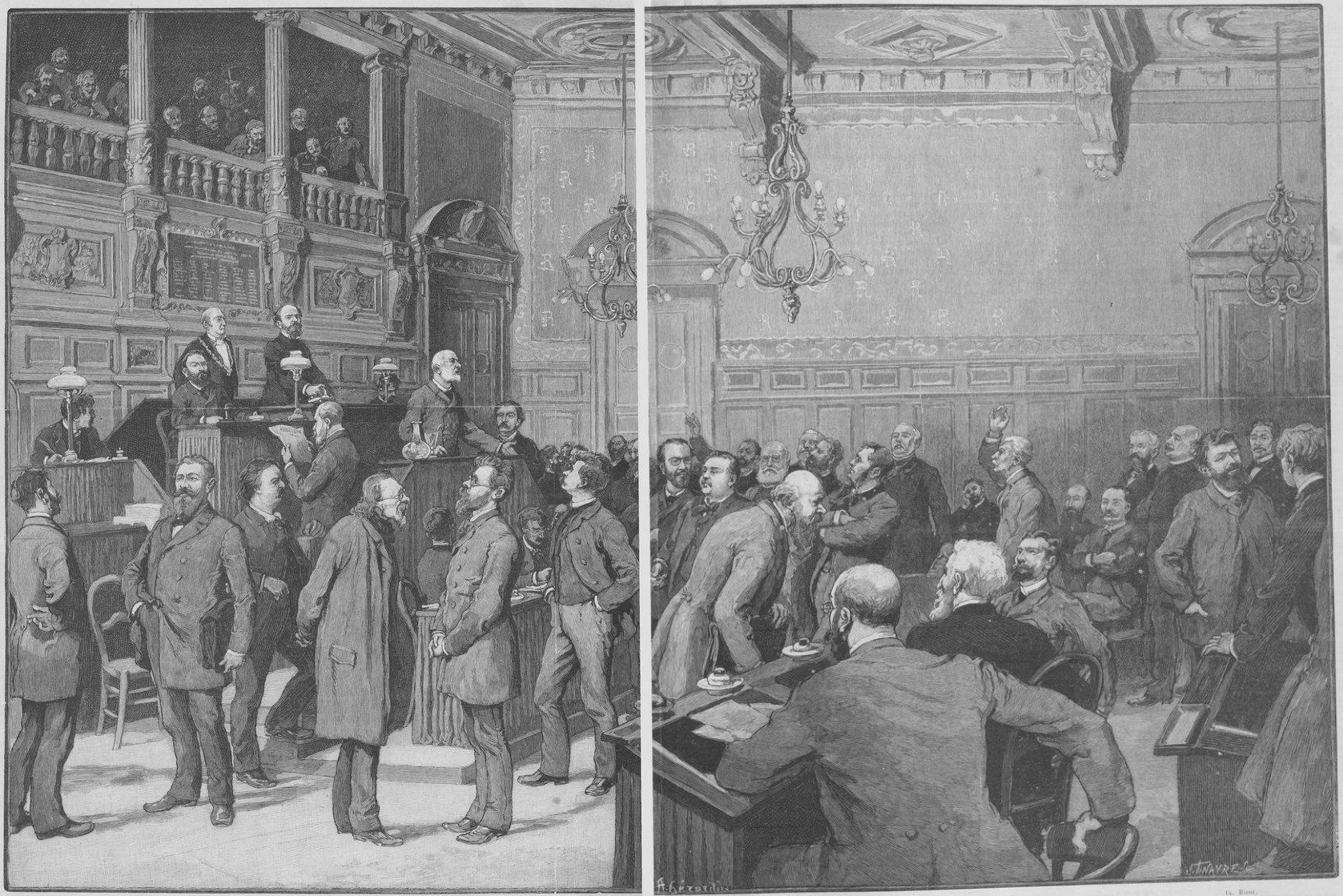
Session of the Paris city council in 1889.

New Municipal elections of July 1871 in Paris were held on July 30, 1871, under the new law of April 14, 1871, passed by the National Assembly, which had relocated to Versailles. Under this law, Paris municipal councilors were now elected like those in other French municipalities. They also became ex officio members of the General Council of the Seine. The Municipal Council now had 80 members, with each arrondissement electing four councilors (one per administrative quarter). However, the state continued to directly administer Paris through the Prefect of the Seine and the Prefect of Police.

Paris councilors were elected for three years, unlike the rest of France, where councilors served four-year terms. The elections were held using a two-round majority vote in single-member districts within each administrative quarter. Municipal elections were held successively in 1874, 1878, 1881, 1884, 1887, 1890, 1893, and 1896. By the French municipal elections of 1896, the Paris municipal elections, which had previously occurred every three years, were synchronized with national municipal elections, which took place every four years. Since then, municipal elections in Paris were held every four years, like the rest of France, in 1900, 1904, 1908, and 1912.

This electoral system was designed by the monarchist-dominated National Assembly to maintain municipal apoliticism and prevent further uprisings. Instead of a mayor, the council elected a president, whose term was renewable at each session. However, this structure initially led to a political struggle between Republicanism in 19th-century France and monarchists from 1871 to 1881. During the decade, the radical Republicans gradually established themselves as the dominant political force.

Nevertheless, the radicals remained opposed to Paris' special status and championed municipal autonomy, particularly through a proposal put forward by radical councilor Sigismond Lacroix on November 6, 1880, which became the foundation of the so-called "autonomist" movement. Between 1881 and 1900, the radicals remained the dominant political force, while the socialists gained ground on the left, at the expense of moderate republicans. However, the influence of Paris' municipalist representatives gradually declined, and the law of April 5, 1884, concerning municipal organization, did not apply to the city of Paris. Then, Paris began shifting to the right in the 1900 municipal elections, a trend that strengthened in subsequent elections. Socialist Émile Chausse had presided over the municipal council from March to November 3, 1909, when a vote of no confidence put him in the minority and 42 votes for the new president Ernest Caron, transferred control of the council's leadership from the left to the right.

== World War I ==
World War I began on August 4, 1914, leading to the suspension of municipal elections. The president of the Municipal Council, Adrien Mithouard, remained in office throughout the war. He died a few months before the next elections, which were finally held on November 30, 1919, after peace was restored.

== From 1919 to 1940 ==
Under a new electoral law, councilors elected in 1919 served a six-year term. Subsequent elections took place in 1925, 1929, and 1935.

The April 10, 1935 law increased the number of municipal councilors from 80 to 90 by further subdividing the most densely populated districts in the outer arrondissements. The term length for Paris municipal councilors, which had originally been three years in 1871, was extended to four years by the law of April 2, 1896, and then to six years by the law of April 10, 1929. Through the determination of its members, the Paris Municipal Council gradually gained political influence, forcing the state-appointed prefects to accommodate its growing power.

== World War II ==
Following the German-Soviet Pact, communists were expelled from the council. After the German invasion of 1940, sessions of the Paris Municipal Council were officially suspended by the law of December 26, 1940. A new law, passed on October 16, 1941, reinstated a 90-member municipal council, composed partly of former councilors whose terms were extended and partly of new members appointed by the Minister of the Interior. For the first time, two women joined the municipal council. The new president, Charles Trochu, belonged to the nationalist right, while his first vice-president, Louis Castellaz, was a former communist who had joined the SFIO (French Section of the Workers' International) in 1936. Trochu was removed from office in 1943 and replaced by Pierre Taittinger.

Following the Parisian uprising of August 1944, the Paris Committee of Liberation assumed the functions of both the Paris Municipal Council and the General Council of the Seine.

== Paris Committee of Liberation and Provisional Municipal Assembly (1945) ==
By decree on March 12, 1945, following discussions between local liberation committees and the Paris Committee of Liberation, (Note: Decree of March 12, 1945 (J.O.R.F. of March 13, 1945 p. 1309)) 85 councilors were appointed as members of the Provisional Municipal Assembly of the city of Paris.

Members of the Provisional Municipal Assembly
The 28 Members of the Parisian Committee of Liberation:
- André Tollet (1913-2001), upholsterer, PCF, President of the Parisian Committee of Liberation.
- André Carrel (1917-2011), journalist, PCF, Vice-President of the Parisian Committee of Liberation.
- Roger Deniau (1899-1971), employee, Vice-President of the Parisian Committee of Liberation, member of the Provisional Consultative Assembly, Mayor of Puteaux (1947-1948), SFIO.
- Léo Hamon (1908-1993), journalist, Vice-President of the Parisian Committee of Liberation.
- Marie-Hélène Lefaucheux (1904-1964), Vice-President of the Parisian Committee of Liberation, MRP.
- Max André (politician) (1893-1977), financial expert, MRP.
- Maurice de Barral (1887-1956), lawyer at the Court of Appeal.
- Jean-François Chabrun (1920-1997), poet, journalist, writer, art critic, PCF.
- Jacques Charpentier (1881-1974), President of the Bar Association at the Court of Appeal.
- Paul Coirre (1911-1989).
- Robert Debré (1882-1978), professor of medicine.
- Joseph Dumas (1904-1971).
- Jeanne Fanonnel (1889-1982), teacher and then school principal, PCF.
- Maurice de Fontenay (1872-1957), former municipal councilor (1919-1941).
- Gérard Jaquet (1916-2013), former secretary of the Parisian group of Socialist Students of the Seine (1938-1940), treasurer of the clandestine Socialist Party (1941-44), SFIO.
- Maurice Lacroix (1893-1989), literature professor, UDSR deputy (1945).
- Emmanuel Lancrenon (1886-1978), former parish priest of Saint-Germain-des-Prés, MRP.
- Paul Langevin (1872-1946), physicist, professor at the Collège de France, PCF.
- Paul Leclerc (1890-1961).
- Juliette Môquet (1898-1956), mother of Guy Môquet, PCF.
- Hélène Mugnier (1910-1972), saleswoman, PCF-Union of French Women.
- Albert Ouzoulias (1915-1995), employee, PCF.
- Jean Panhaleux (1891-1952), Radical, former deputy treasurer of the National Federation of Republican Fighters.
- Albert Rigal (1900-1984), worker, PCF, former deputy for the 4th arrondissement (1936-1940).
- Mario Roques (1875-1961), professor at the Collège de France.
- Eugène Saint-Bastien (1905-1977), member of the People's Committees, PCF.
- Robert Salmon (politician) (1918-2013), former leader of the MLN, member of the UDSR.
- Georges Thévenin (1917-1976), office worker and hairdresser, PCF.

The 57 Delegates from the Arrondissements:

- Gaston Auguet (1904-1986), indirect tax controller, former municipal councilor of Paris (1935-1940), PCF.
- Maurice Berlemont (1914-1992), bank employee, PCF.
- Raymond Bossus (1903-1981), CGTU trade unionist, former municipal councilor of Paris (1935-1940), PCF.
- Marcel Brenot (1908-1992), hat maker, CGT trade union leader, PCF.
- Marius Buisson (1902-1984), chauffeur, PCF.
- Georges Demeure (1902-1974), taxi driver, PCF.
- Françoise Flageollet (1907-?), typist, PCF.
- Emmanuel Fleury (1900-1970), retail and postal employee, former municipal councilor of Paris (1936-1940), PCF.
- Auguste Lemasson (1900-1992), construction worker and mine timberman, PCF.
- Françoise Leclercq (1908-1983), PCF-UFF.
- Madeleine Martin (1908-1998), teacher, PCF.
- Léon Mauvais (1902-1980), former member of the CGTU secretariat, PCF.
- Robert Mension (1906-1986), construction worker, decorative painter, PCF.
- Maria Rabaté (1900-1985), teacher, PCF.
- Lucien Rameau (1913-2005), typographer, PCF.
- Georges Ripplinger (1904-1984), metallurgist, PCF.
- Jean Thomasson (1900-1962), employee of the Paris Metro, PCF.
- André Lecœur (1900-1986).
- Louis Millet (1912-1978).
- Joseph Turpin de Morel (1893-1977), labor inspector.
- Henri Billebaut (1900-1988), SFIO.
- André Clément (1897-1986).
- Pierre Corval (1910-1973), journalist.
- Henri-Julien Féréol (1894-1962).
- Georges Hirsch (1895-1974), engineer, poet, playwright, former municipal councilor (1935-1941), SFIO.
- André Joublot (1902-1987), journalist, SFIO.
- André Le Troquer (1884-1963), lawyer, member of the National Council of Resistance, former municipal councilor (1919-1941), SFIO.
- René Menuet (1909-1972), SFIO.
- Xavier Péladan (1912-1952), SFIO.
- Roger Priou-Valjean (1912-1999), former Ligue d'action universitaire républicaine et socialiste leader, SFIO.
- Paul Rivet (1876-1958), military doctor, ethnologist, professor at the National Museum of Natural History, director of the Museum of Man, SFIO.
- Georges Copigneaux (1893-1968), former municipal councilor (1933-1941), Radical.
- Charles-Albert Gallois (1892-?).
- Bernard Lafay (1903-1977), medical doctor, Radical.
- Alban Satragne (1887-1954), former municipal councilor (1937-1941), Radical.
- Raphaël Schneid (1889-1966), former municipal councilor (1935-1941), Radical.
- Jean Cayeux (1910-2001), legal advisor, later commercial director, member of the first and second National Constituent Assemblies, MRP.
- Roland Ganier (1908-?), MRP.
- Jean Raymond-Laurent (1890-1969), former municipal councilor (1925-1941), MRP.
- Henry de Mauduit (1897-1975), MRP.
- Hubert Prangey (1902-1991), MRP.
- François Suzanne (1918-1993), MRP.
- Étienne-Michel Bertogne (1908-1987).
- Robert Bétolaud (1901-1983).
- Alex Biscarre (1891-1977), former municipal councilor (1932-1941).
- Max Brusset (1909-1992), corporate administrator, former chief of staff to Georges Mandel.
- Victor Bucaille (1890-1969), lawyer and journalist, former municipal councilor (1925-1944).
- Suzanne Charbonneaux (1920-1996), former Resistance fighter (French Fighting Forces).
- Georges Contenot (1867-1948), former municipal councilor (1924-1941).
- Joseph Denais (1877-1960), former municipal councilor (1908-1912, 1919-1929).
- Paul Faber (1896-1976), company director.
- Paul Fleurot (1874-1946), journalist, former Democratic Left Senator (1936-1940).
- Édouard Frédéric-Dupont (1902-1995), lawyer, former municipal councilor (1933-1944).
- Marie Geoffray (1899-1978).
- Hubert Lefèvre-Pontalis (1909-1977), lawyer at the Paris Court of Appeal.
- Jacques-Xavier Maîtrejean (1909-2002), company director, reserve lieutenant.
- Gaston Rimey (1878-1977).

== From 1945 to 1967 ==
Starting in 1945, the previous two-round, single-member voting system by administrative quarter was abandoned. Instead, the 90 municipal councilors were now elected through a proportional multi-member system in six electoral districts. This system allowed for panachage (mixing candidates from different lists) and incomplete lists, with seats distributed based on quotient and remainder calculations, taking into account the number of votes received by each candidate.

Division of the arrondissements by sector in 1945
Sector	Arrondissements	Number of councillors
1	5th, 13th, 14th	14
2	6th, 7th, 15th	14
3	8th, 16th, 17th	16
4	1st, 2nd, 9th, 18th	14
5	3rd, 4th, 10th, 11th	15
6	12th, 19th, 20th	17

New municipal elections were held on April 29, 1945. There were 108 lists, resulting in a left-wing majority. Among the 88 elected officials, the distribution was as follows: 27 Communists, 12 Socialists, 5 Radicals, 14 MRP, 8 "resistant" candidates, and 22 Moderates (right-wing).

André Le Troquer (SFIO Socialist) was elected president of the Municipal Council with 84 votes out of 86 cast.While the proportional voting system remained in place, a new redistribution of districts by sectors was carried out in 1947.

Division of the arrondissements by sector in 1947
Sector	Arrondissements	Number of councillors
1	5th, 6th, 7th	9
2	13th, 14th	11
3	15th	8
4	1st, 2nd, 8th, 9th	9
5	16th, 17th	13
6	18th,	9
7	3rd, 4th, 10th	8
8	12th, 11th	11
9	19th, 20th	12

In the French municipal elections of 1947, fewer lists were present (only 74). The RPF secured 52 seats, obtaining an absolute majority. The Communist group won 25 seats, the Socialist group secured 8, and the MRP was reduced to just five seats.

The RPF was in a dominant position, and Pierre de Gaulle was elected president of the Municipal Council with 51 votes, defeating the Communist Raymond Bossus (25 votes) and the Socialist Gaston Gévaudan (8 votes). The MRP abstained from voting.

In the French municipal elections of 1953, eight parties ran candidates across all sectors: the PCF, SFIO, MRP, the Union of Independents and the RGR, the CNI, the Republican Federation of Independents, the Union of National Republicans, and the RPF.

The elected officials were as follows: 28 Communists, 26 Independents, 9 Socialists, 10 RPF, 6 MRP, and 11 RGR. Édouard Frédéric-Dupont (Independent) was elected president of the Municipal Council. A new redistricting of sectors took place in 1959.

Division of the arrondissements by sector in 1959
Sector	Arrondissements	Number of councillors
1	5th, 6th, 7th	9
2	13th, 14th	11
3	15th	8
4	1st, 2nd, 3rd, 4th	7
5	16th, 17th	14
6	18th,	9
7	8th, 9th, 10th	10
8	12th, 11th	11
9	19th, 20th	11

In the 1959 elections, 96 lists participated. Five parties were present in all nine sectors: the PCF, SFIO, MRP, UNR, and CNI.

The elected officials were: 29 Communists, 1 UFD, 9 Socialists, 3 MRP, 4 Republican Center members, 23 UNR, 19 CNI, and two various right-wing members.

Dr. Pierre Devraigne was elected president of the Municipal Council.

For the 1965 elections, the voting system was modified. The elections were once again conducted using a majority voting system within a two-round, multi-member blocked list system. Paris was redistricted into 14 electoral sectors.

Division of the arrondissements by sector in 1965
Sector	Arrondissements	Number of councillors
1	1st, 2nd, 3rd, 4th	7
2	5th, 6th	6
3	7th, 8th	6
4	9th, 10th	7
5	11th	6
6	12th	5
7	13th	5
8	14th	6
9	15th	8
10	16th	7
11	17th	7
12	18th	8
13	19th	5
14	20th	7

The elected officials were: 25 Communists (and allies), 2 PSU, 2 Radicals, 9 SFIO Socialists, 13 Centrists, 27 UNR, and 12 Gaullist allies.

Albert Chavanac was elected with 48 votes (Gaullists and Centrists) against 38 for Pierre Giraud (politician, 1913-1988) (Socialist).

Following the merger of the municipal council and the general council into a single assembly, the Paris Council, the Paris Municipal Council ceased its functions on December 31, 1967.

== The President of the Municipal Council ==
The president's role was limited to presiding over the Council and representing it at official ceremonies. However, this position was highly sought after, as it encompassed all the honorary functions of a mayor. Originally, the president and vice-president were appointed by the King. Under the Second Empire, the president was elected by the 36 municipal council members. After the 1871 reform, the president was elected by his peers, along with two vice presidents, at each council session. The president, vice presidents, four secretaries, and a syndic formed the council's executive board, often leading to rivalries and frequent changes in officeholders. From 1890 onwards, the president was elected for a one-year term, with elections generally held in May, based on the date of the preceding municipal elections.

Some presidents of the Paris Municipal Council later held national responsibilities, such as Pierre-Christian Taittinger and Jacques Dominati as Secretaries of State, or Charles Hérisson and André Le Troquer as ministers. Two of them rose to the highest governmental responsibilities: Charles Floquet and Georges Clemenceau, who became the 46th and 63rd Chairman of the Council of Ministers (France), respectively.

== Bibliography ==
- Nagaï, Nobuhito (2002). Les conseillers municipaux de Paris sous la IIIe République [The city councillors of Paris under the Third Republic] (in French). Paris: Publications de la Sorbonne.
- Nivet, Philippe (1994). Le Conseil municipal de Paris de 1944 à 1977 [The Paris City Council from 1944 to 1977] (in French). Paris: Publications de la Sorbonne.
