= Charles Beslay =

French politician (1795–1878)

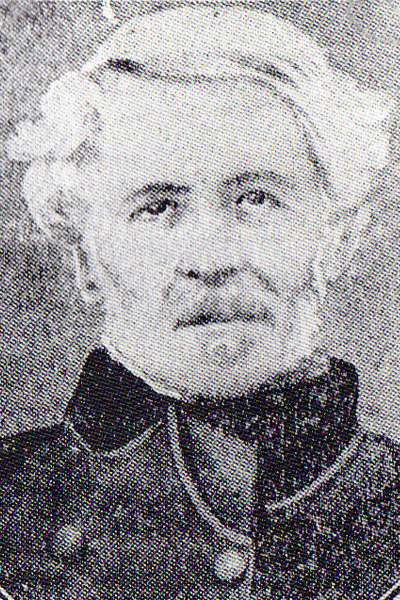
A picture of Charles Beslay (1795–1878)

Charles Victor Beslay (1795 in Dinan, Côtes-d'Armor – 1878 in Neuchâtel) was the oldest member of the Paris Commune.

An engineer, he was councillor general of Morbihan in 1830. Later, in Paris, he founded a steam machine factory, and tried to apply the ideas of his friend Proudhon on the association of capital to work. After the 1848 Revolution the provisional government named him Commissioner of the Republic in Morbihan. He was a moderate republican member of the Constituent Assembly, where he suppressed the insurgents of the insurgency of June 1848. He did not sit in the legislative assembly. In the Second Empire, he was bankrupted creating a bank which exchanged and discounted using Proudhonian ideas. In 1866, he joined the International Workingmen's Association.

During the siege of Paris by the Germans (September 1870 – March 1871), he was delegate to the Comité central républicain des Vingt arrondissements with title of the 6th arrondissement. On 26 March he was elected to the Conseil de la Commune of the 6th arrondissement. On 29 March he became a member of the Finance Commission and became delegate of the Commune for the Banque de France. At the end of May 1871, due to a free pass from the Thiers government, he became a refugee in Switzerland after the failure of the Commune. In December 1872, the war council made no case against him.

== Sources ==
- Bernard Noël, Dictionnaire de la Commune, Flammarion, collection Champs, 1978.
