= Delphine Arnould de Cool-Fortin =

French painter and writer

- Born: 25 December 1830; Limoges
- Died: 16 January 1921 (aged 90)
- Spouse(s): Alexandre de Cool, Arthur Arnould (1890)

Delphine Arnould de Cool, née Fortin (25 December 1830 – 16 January 1921) was a French painter and writer on Limoges porcelain.

== Biography ==
Cool-Fortin was born as the daughter of the painter Paul Fortin in Limoges. She was something of a child prodigy and became a successful painter at a young age, signing works as Delphine Fortin. She married Alexandre de Cool and had two sons born in Limoges, including the painter Gabriel de Cool born in 1854, and a daughter born in Paris after the couple moved there soon afterwards. During this period, she signed works as Delphine de Cool. Her husband was a writer and the couple were both members of the Société des gens de lettres. Madame de Cool became a teacher and a writer on Limoges porcelain, and was head of an "Élisa Lemonnier" school in 1890 when she published her treatise on porcelain in French and English called Traité de peintures vitrifiables sur porcelaine dure et porcelaine tendre sur émail.

After her husband died, she married the sculptor-writer Arthur Arnould in 1890.

She exhibited her work at The Woman's Building at the 1893 World's Columbian Exposition in Chicago, Illinois, and her treatise was included in the Women's Library, along with a discussion of her miniature works in gouache by her second husband (writing under his pseudonym A. Matthey).

Her painting A Good Cigarette was included in the 1905 book Women Painters of the World.

== Gallery ==
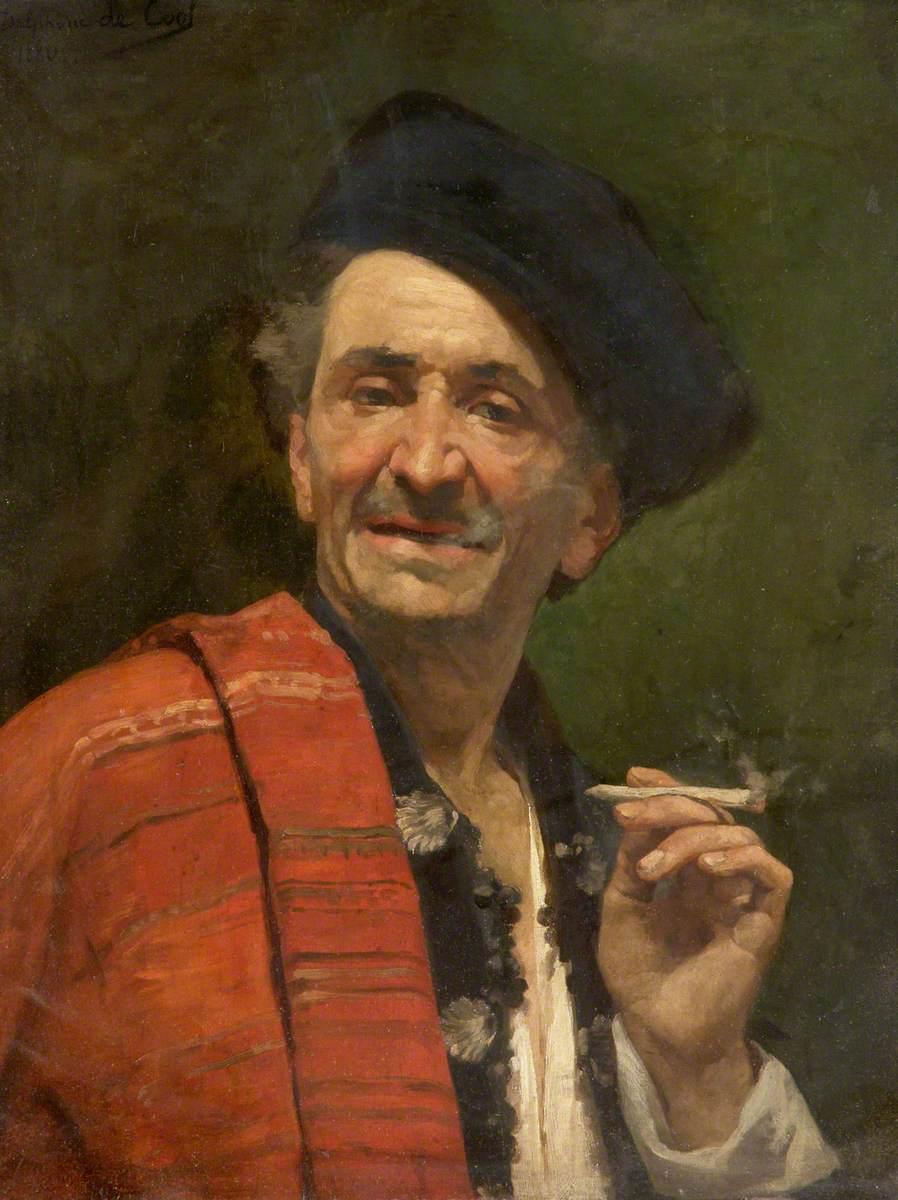
A Good Cigarette

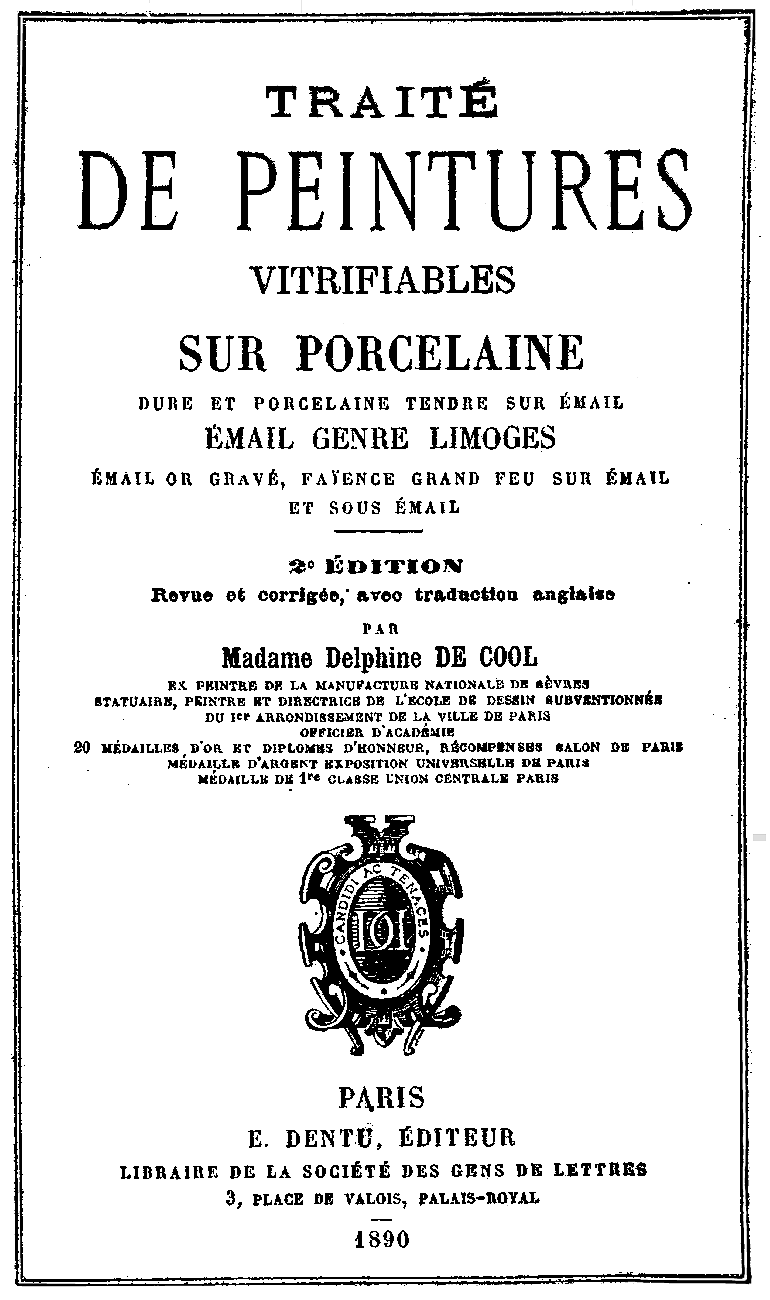
Traité de peintures vitrifiables sur porcelaine, 1890
