= Pierre Vésinier =

French politician and journalist (1824 - 1902)

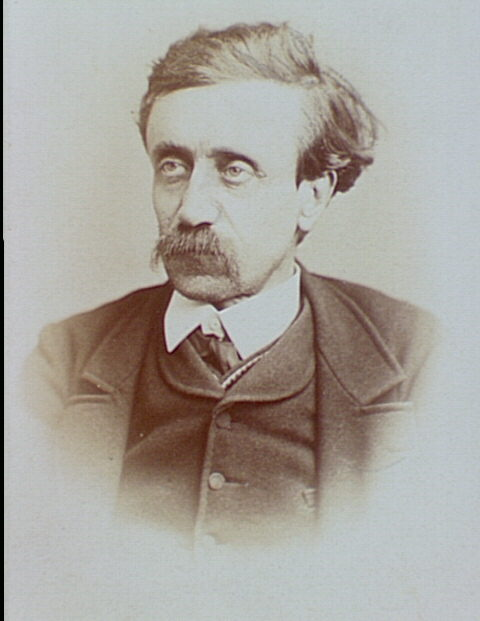
Pierre Vésinier (1824–1902)

Pierre Vésinier (1824 in Mâcon (Saône-et-Loire) - 1902 in Paris) was a prominent figure in the Paris Commune.

== Career ==
A journalist in Mâcon and later in Paris, Vésinier was exiled after Louis-Napoléon Bonaparte's coup d'état on December 2, 1851. He settled in Geneva, from where he was expelled, then moved to Brussels and finally to London. He published caricatures targeting Napoleon III, Empress Eugénie, and Pope Pius IX. In 1867, he was sentenced to eighteen months in prison by a Belgian court. In 1864, he joined the International Workingmen's Association.

He returned to Paris after the proclamation of the Republic on September 4, 1870. During the siege of Paris by the Germans (September 1870 - March 1871), he was elected commander of a National Guard battalion. He participated in the 1870 uprising against the policies of the Government of National Defense. After the proclamation of the Commune on March 26, 1871, he launched the newspaper "Paris libre." In the supplementary elections of April 16, 1871, he was elected to the Commune Council by the 1st arrondissement. He served on the Public Services commission and became director of the Official Journal on May 12. He voted for the establishment of the Committee of Public Safety. After the Bloody Week, he sought refuge in London. In 1871, he published a Histoire de la Commune de Paris, where he settled scores with his former comrades.

== Publications ==
- Les Amours de Napoléon III, 1863
- Le Martyr de la liberté des nègres, ou John Brown, le Christ des noirs, 1864
- La Vie du nouveau César, étude historique. L'écrivain, le publiciste et le réformateur, 1865
- L'Histoire du nouveau César, Louis-Napoléon Bonaparte conspirateur : Strasbourg et Boulogne, 1865
- L'Histoire du nouveau César, Louis-Napoléon Bonaparte représentant et président, 1866
- Le Mariage d'une espagnole, 1866
- Mœurs impériales, royales et papales. Le mariage de la cousine de l'Espagnole, 2 vol., 1868
- Histoire de la Commune de Paris, 1871
