= Sri Ramana Ashram =

Hindu spiritual school

Coordinates: 12.2241°N 79.0568°E

- Sri Ramana Ashram
- Sri Ramanasramam
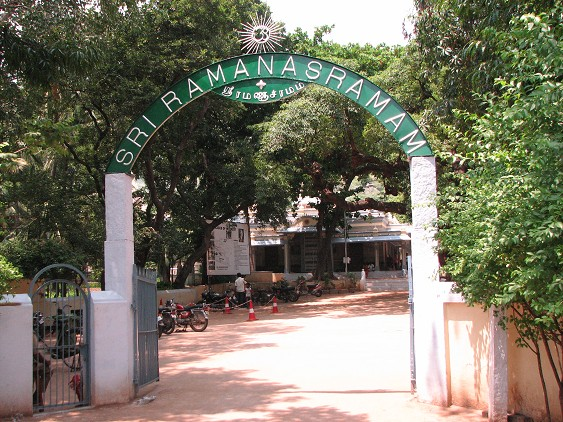
- Sri Ramanasram main entrance
- Established: December 28, 1922
- Founder: Ramana Maharshi
- Type: Nonprofit Trust
- Location: Tiruvannamalai, Tamil Nadu, India
- Publication: Mountain Path (estb. 1964)
- Website: www.gururamana.org

Sri Ramana Ashram, also known as Sri Ramanasramam, is a historic ashram (spiritual hermitage and community) and international organisation located at the base of the sacred Arunachala Hill in Tiruvannamalai, Tamil Nadu. It is dedicated to the life and teachings of Ramana Maharshi, modern sage and Advaita (Nondualism) Teacher, who lived here from 1922 until his death in 1950. He offered guidance primarily through silent presence and minimal verbal instruction rooted in his central teaching of self-enquiry (“Who am I?”). Established in 1922 around the samadhi shrine of his mother, the ashram evolved organically from a small hut into a significant pilgrimage destination for thousands of seekers of self-realisation, and Advaita Vedanta traditions flocked to be in his presence. The guru's body is also enshrined in a samadhi hall.

Today, a century later, the ashram functions both as a place of meditation, spiritual study and retreat. It houses meditation halls, shrines, a library and archives, Vedpathshala (School of Vedas education), Goshala (Cow Shelter) and 200-room residential facilities. His Samadhi shrine continues to attract devotees from all over the world. The ashram functions as an international organisation and non-profit trust, with outreach centres known as Ramana Kendras in New Delhi (estb. 1963), Hyderabad and Chennai in India and Arunachala Ashram in New York City, Ramana Satchidananda Mandali in Mumbai established in 1923; and around 100 spiritual centers, known as Satsangh Centres or Kendras, in 65 countries, including the US, Switzerland, Mauritius, Japan, France, Spain and Eastern Europe.

The ashram Library and Archives, Granthalaya preserves all the writings of Ramana Maharishi, and publishes over 200 books in English, Tamil, Telugu, Gujarati and Marathi, besides numerous foreign languages, including French, Spanish, Russian, Portuguese, German, Romanian and Hungarian. It also publishes a quarterly magazine The Mountain Path since 1964 on the Avadita philosophy and teachings of Maharshi. To mark the ashram's centenary in 2022, the Government of India released a commemorative silver coin.

== History ==
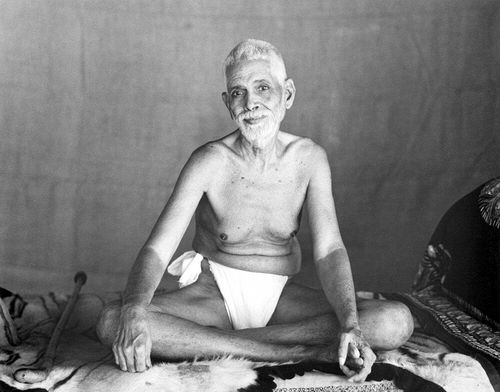
Ramana Maharshi in the Old Hall in 1948, where he lived from 1927 to 1950

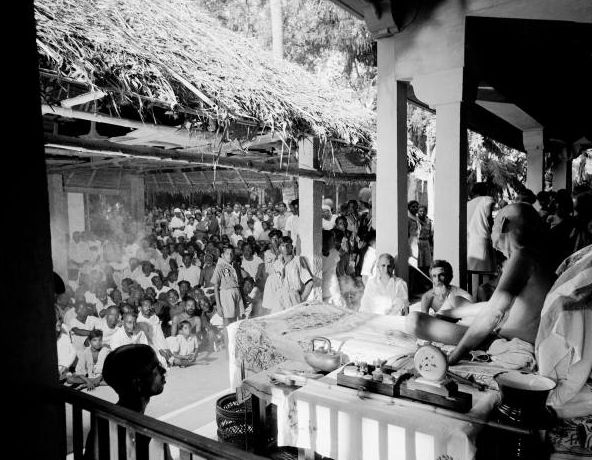
Ramana Maharshi with followers at the ashram

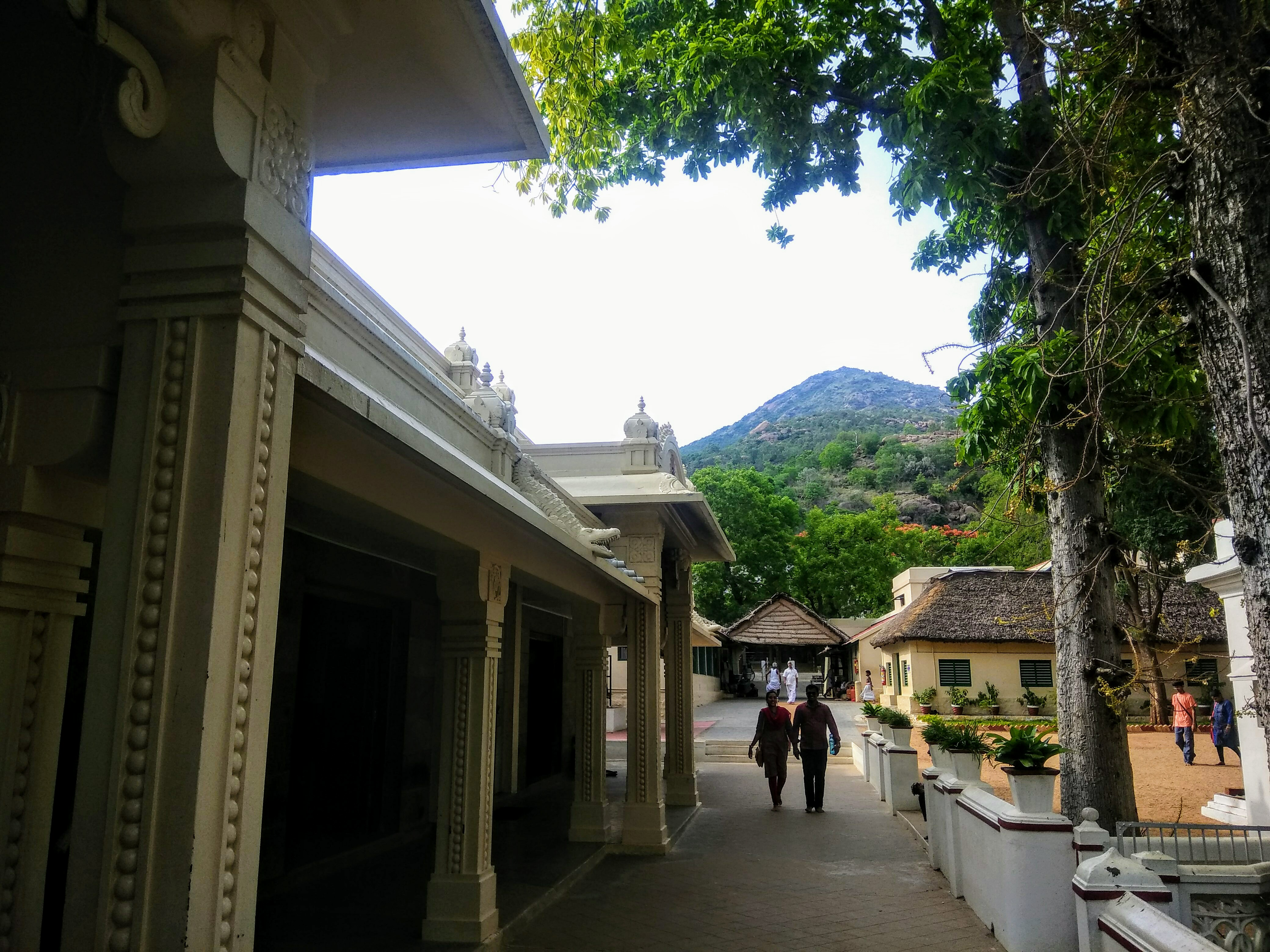
Sri Ramanasramam campus.

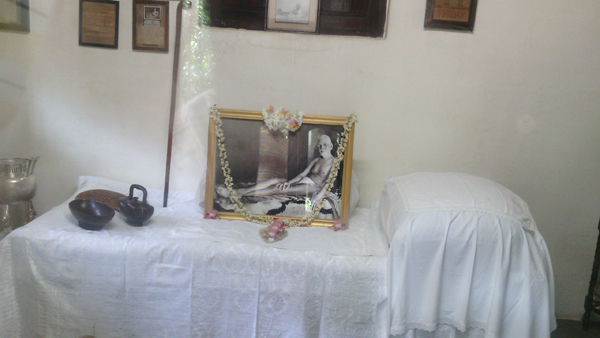
Ramana Maharshi Mahanirvana room in Sri Ramana Ashram.

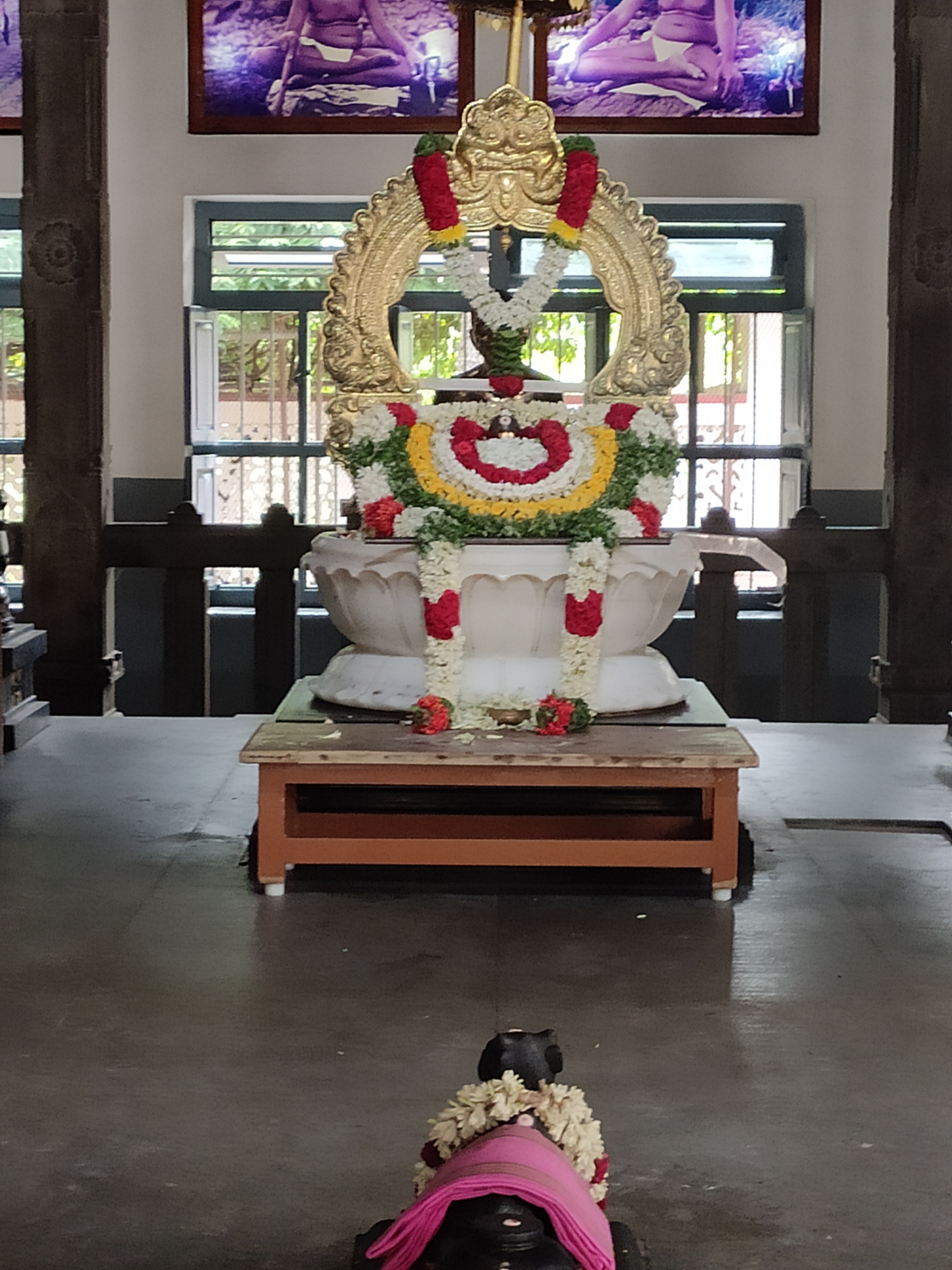
Ramana Maharshi Samadhi inside the ashram

The ashram gradually grew in its present location after Ramana Maharshi settled near the Samadhi shrine of his mother Alagammal, who died on 19 May 1922. From 1922 until his death in 1950, Ramana Maharshi lived at the ashram that developed around his mother's tomb. Initially, Ramana Maharshi would often walk from Skandashram to his mother's tomb. In December 1922, he did not return to Skandashram and settled at the base of the Hill, and Sri Ramanasramam started to develop. In the beginning, a single small hut was built near the samadhi, but in 1924, two huts were erected – one opposite the samadhi and the other to the north. The so-called Old Hall was built in 1928, where Ramana Maharshi lived until 1949.

Sri Ramanasramam grew to include a library, hospital, post office, and many other facilities. Ramana Maharshi displayed a natural talent for planning and building projects. Annamalai Swami gave detailed accounts of this in his reminiscences. The Ramanasramam temple within the campus was designed and constructed by architect-cum-builder Vaidyanatha Sthapati between 1939 and 1949. He was a 36th-generation descendant of Kunjaramallan Rajaraja Perunthachan, the architect of the 11th-century Brihadeeswara Temple in Thanjavur. During its decade-long construction period, Maharshi was deeply involved in the project.

Amongst its early western visitors was British writer Paul Brunton in 1931, who is credited with introducing Ramana Maharshi to the West through his books "A Search in Secret India" (1934) and "The Secret Path". Writer W. Somerset Maugham visited the ashram in 1938, and later used Ramana Maharshi as the model for the holy man, Shri Ganesha in his novel, The Razor’s Edge (1944). Other visitors included Swami Sivananda, Paramahansa Yogananda, Alfred Sorensen (Sunyata) and Wei Wu Wei. During the Indian independence movement, Mahatma Gandhi would often encourage freedom fighters to visit the Ashram, including Dr Rajendra Prasad, Sarojini Naidu, and Jamnalal Bajaj.

Arthur Osborne stayed at the Ashram for twenty years, and edited the Ashram's journal, The Mountain Path (estb. 1964), besides writing several books on Ramana Maharshi and his teachings. Mouni Sadhu spent several months at the Ashram in 1949. David Godman came to the ashram in 1976, remained the ashram librarian from 1978 to 1985, and has since written or edited fourteen books on topics related to Sri Ramana Maharshi. He continues to live near the ashram.

Niranjananda Swami, younger brother of Ramana Maharshi, who had moved to the ashram along with his mother in 1916, stayed at the ashram for the rest of his life and handled its management till his death in 1953. His son, T.N. Venkatraman and grandson have looked after the ashram in turn. V.S. Ramanan remained the President of the ashram from 1994 to 2020; after that, his son Dr. Venkat Ramanan, a former medical practitioner and grand nephew of Ramana Maharishi, became the President.

Today, the ashram's living quarters have 200 rooms. The 'Veda Patasala', established in 1934, trains priests in rituals and the Vedas. It has several Ramana Kendras across India and worldwide, and around 100 centres in 65 countries, including the US, Switzerland, Mauritius, Japan, France, Spain and Eastern Europe. They are involved in spreading the philosophy of Ramana Maharshi. The ashram runs community service initiatives, like free medical dispensaries, providing meals for sadhus and the underprivileged, and environmental conservation projects.

In 2023, marking the centenary of the establishment of the ashram on December 28, 1922, The Hindu Group released new editions of books on Ramana Maharshi, Who Am I and Bhagvan Sri Ramana Maharshi, 1879-1950, this was part of the year-long celebrations at the ashram.

To mark the centenary of the ashram (1922–2022), the Government of India Mint released a commemorative coin in silver to "honour both the enduring spiritual influence of Bhagavan Sri Ramana Maharshi and the historic role of Sri Ramana Ashram."

== Gallery ==
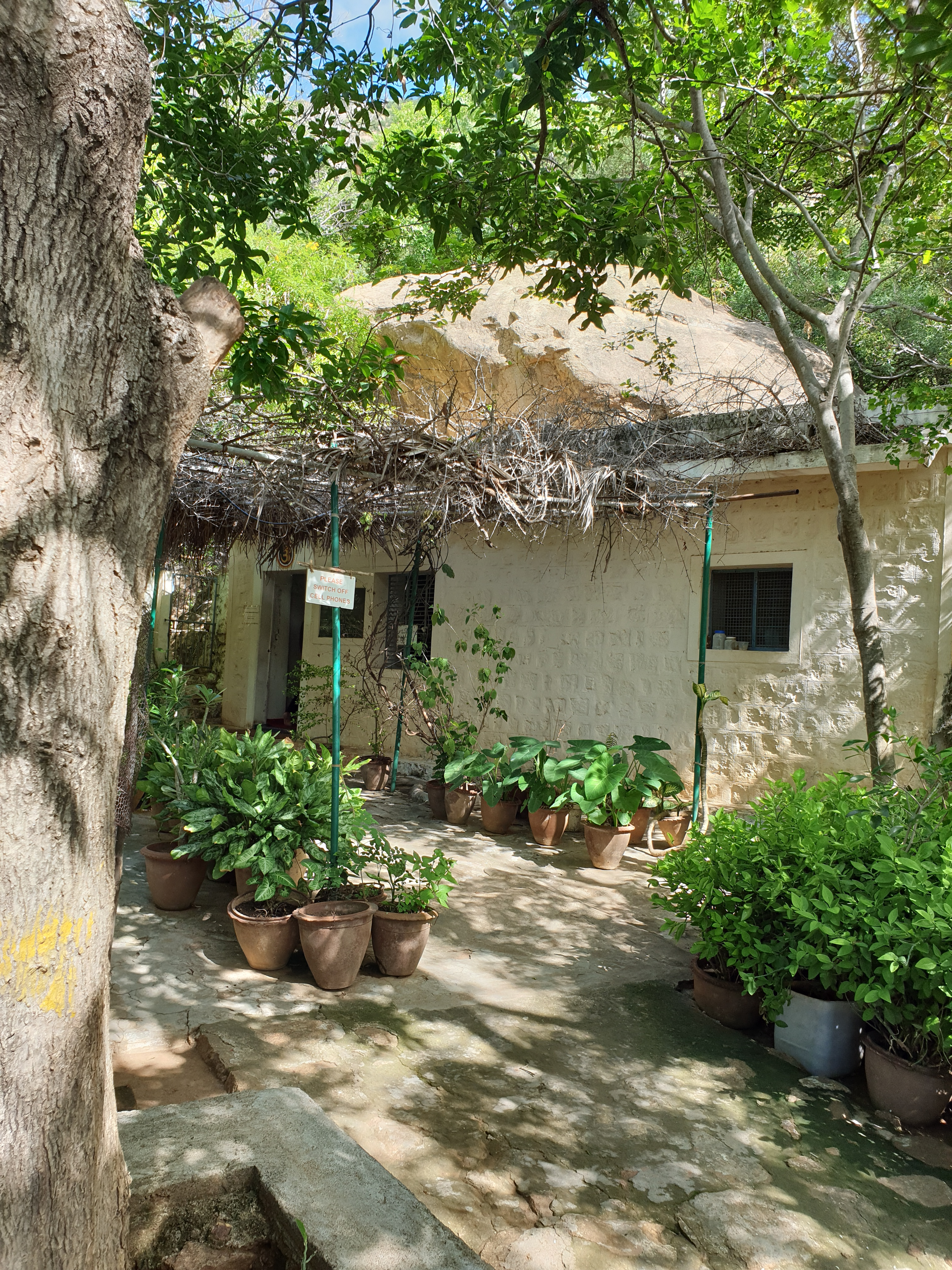
Virupaksha Cave, where Ramana Maharishi stayed the 17 years, on southeastern slope, Arunachala hill.

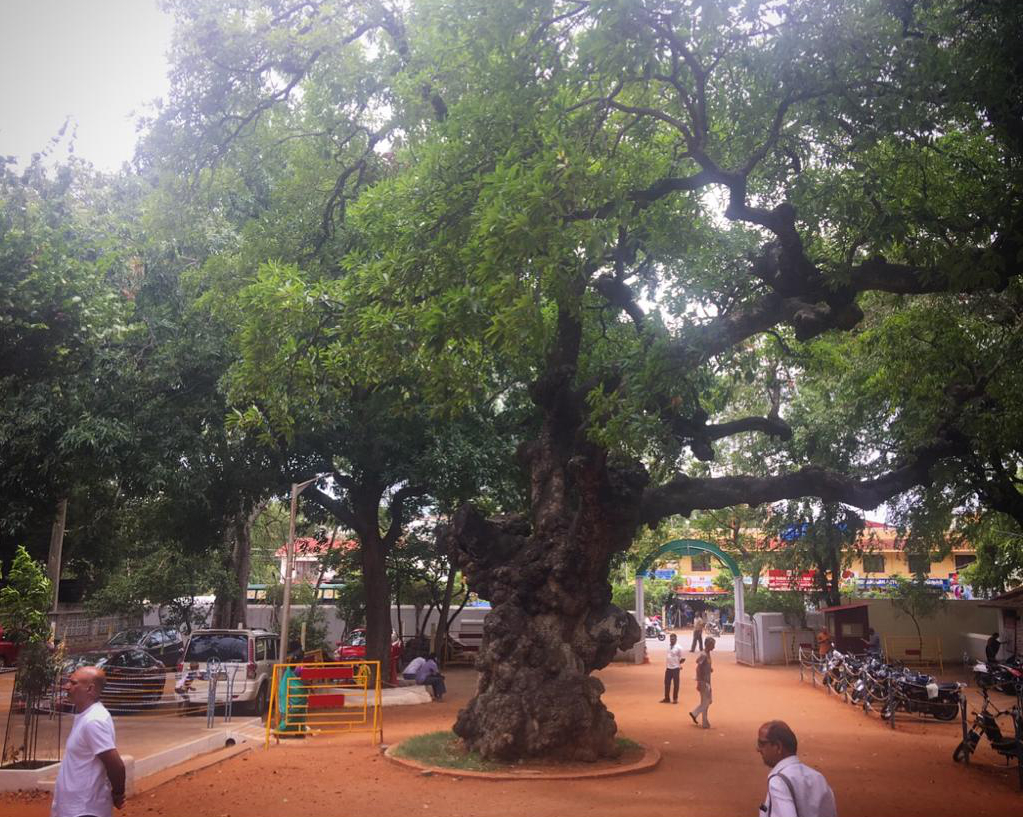
Ramanasaramam Campus

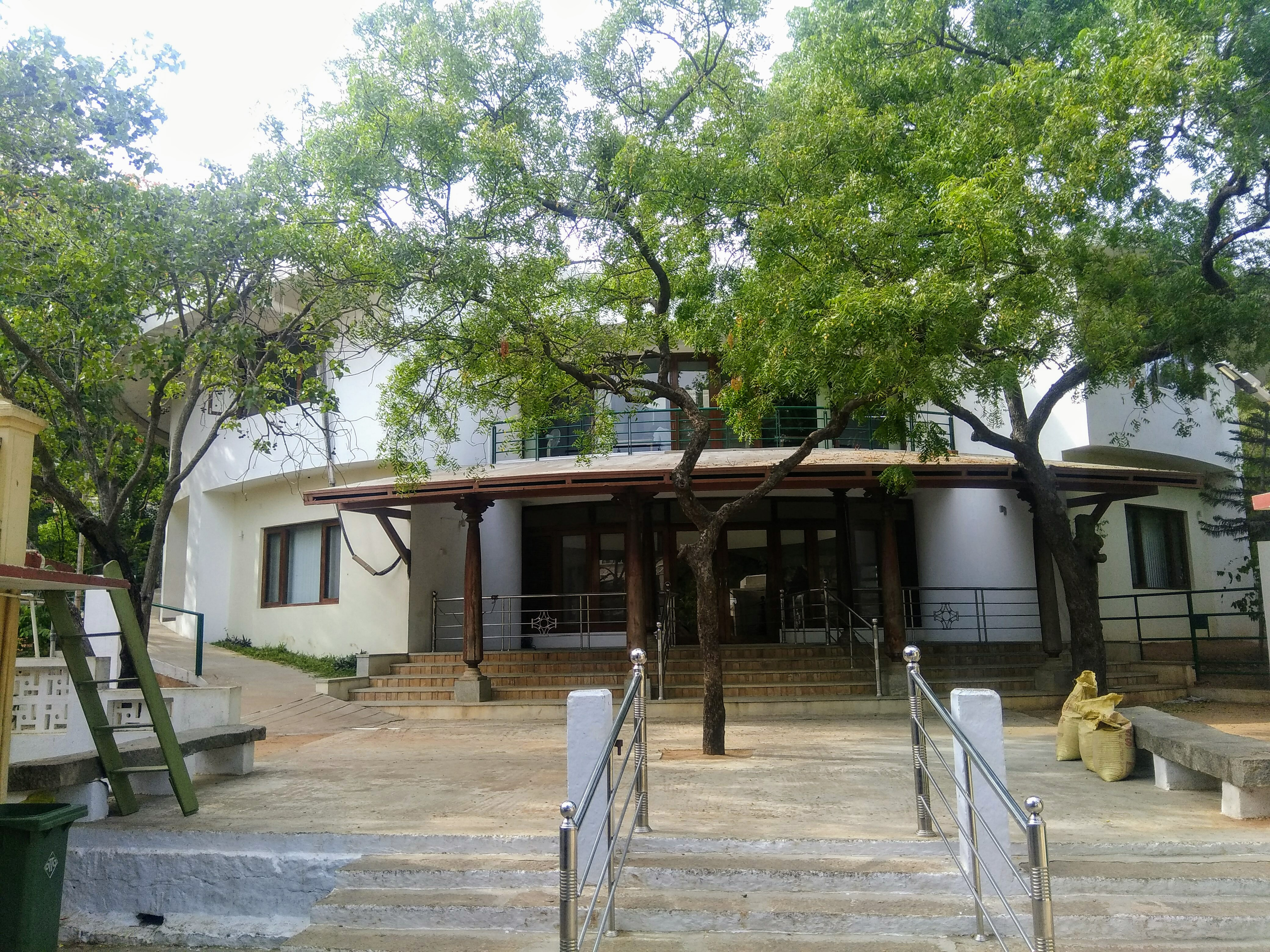
Sri Ramanaramam Public Library

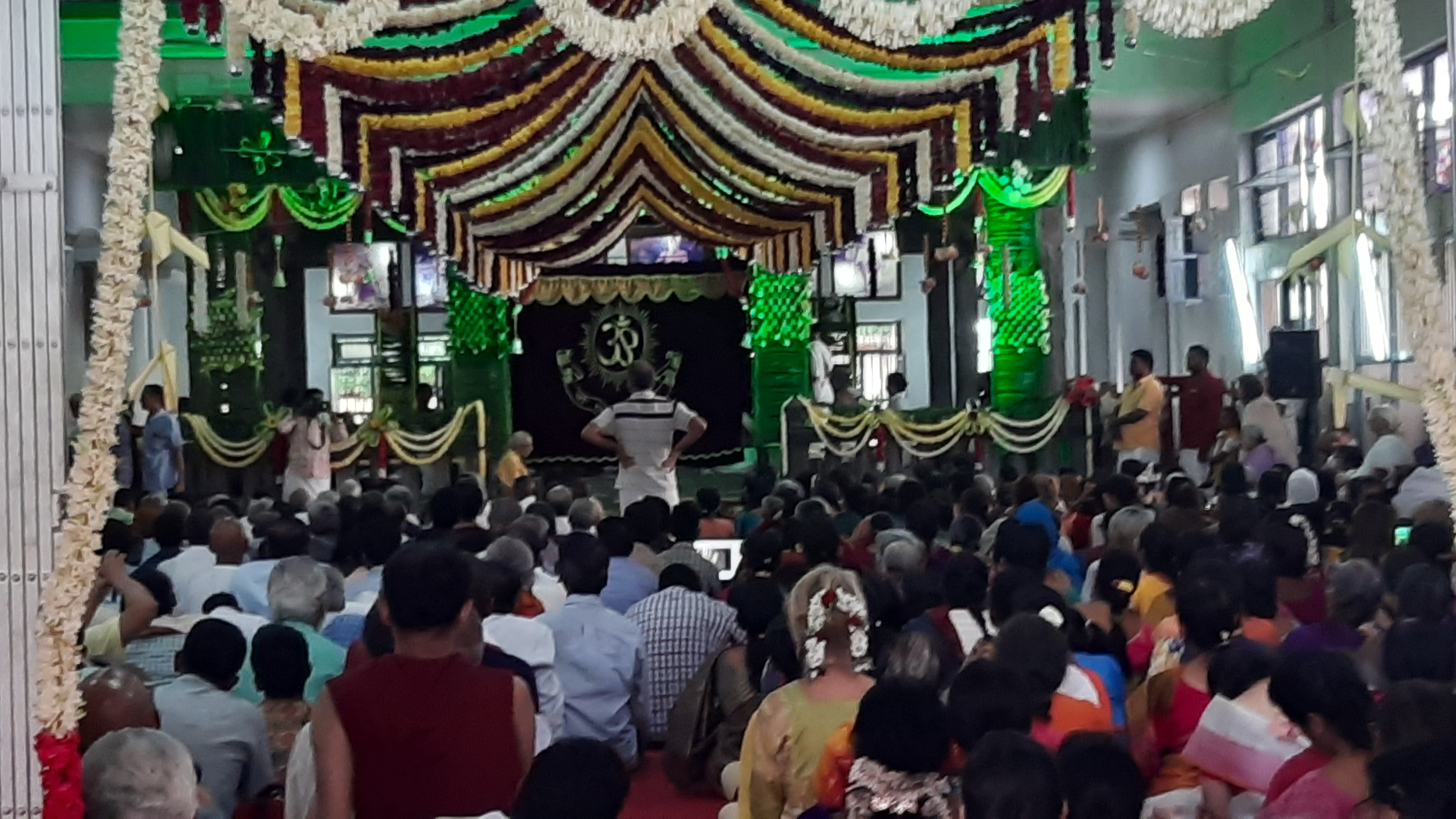
Main temple decorated during Maharshi's birthday celebrations

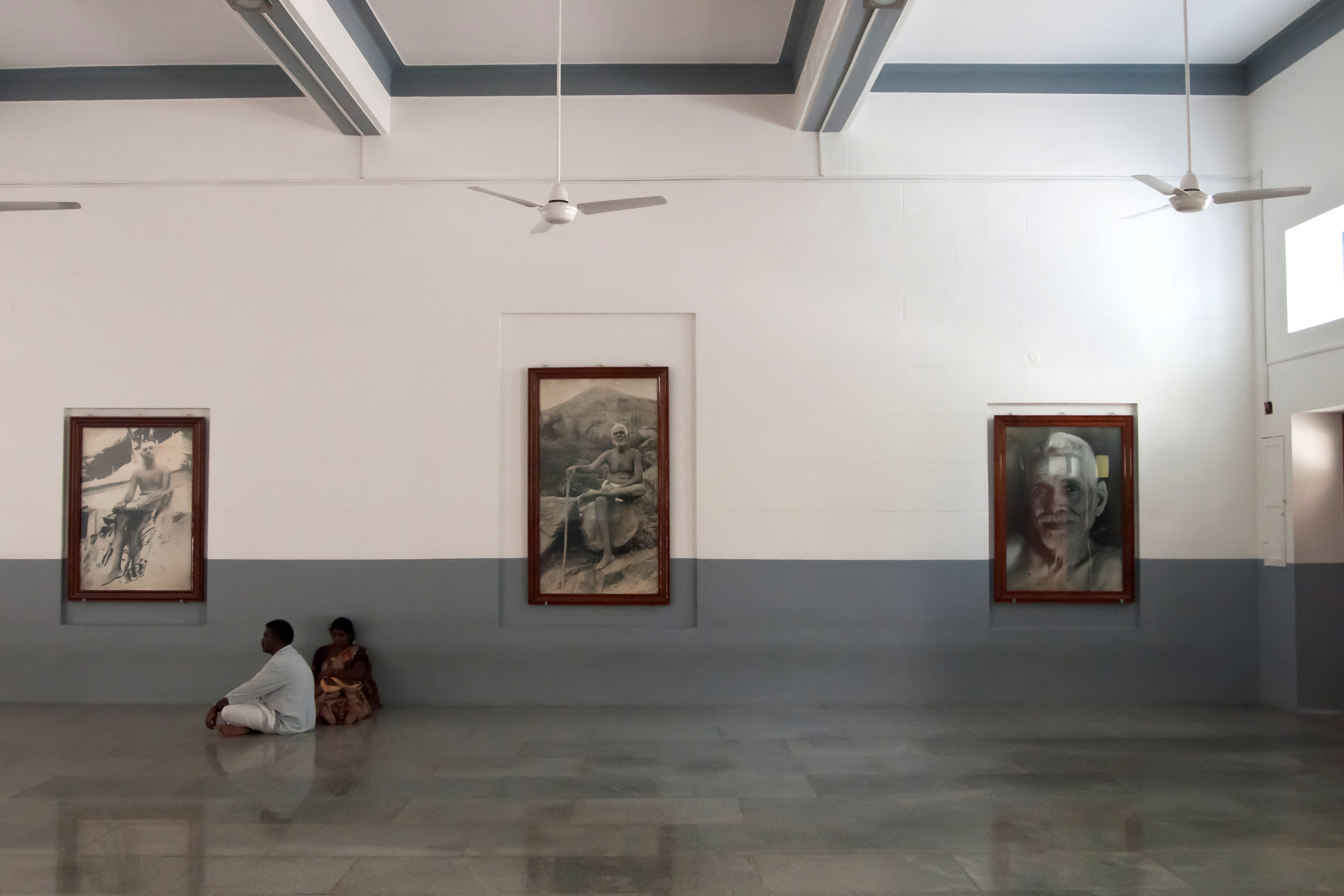
Main Hall

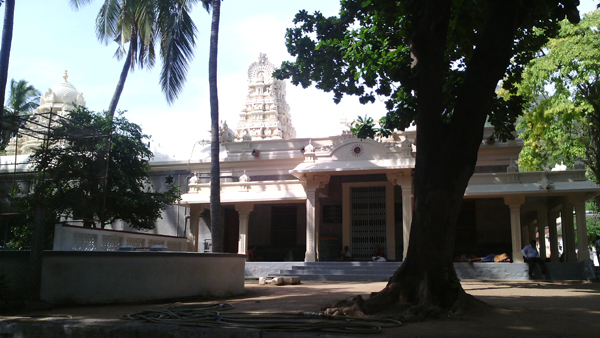
Shiva temple inside Ramana Ashram

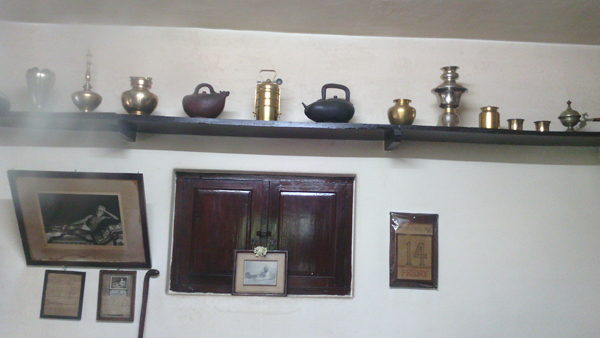
Personal use objects of Ramana Maharshi

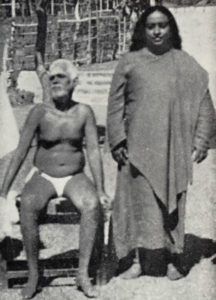
Ramana Maharshi with Paramahansa Yogananda at the ashram

== See also ==
- Advaita Vedanta
- Arunachala
- Tiruvannamalai
- Vedanta Society

== Sources ==
- Abram, David (2003). The Rough Guide to South India. Rough Guides. ISBN 1-84353-103-8.
- Ebert, Gabriele (2006). Ramana Maharshi: His Life. Lulu.com. ISBN 1-4116-7350-6.
- Self-Realization: The Life and Teachings of Bhagavan Sri Ramana Maharshi, by B.V. Narasimha Swami (ISBN 81-88225-74-6)
- Yogananda, Paramahansa (2008). Autobiography of a Yogi. Diamond Pocket Books. ISBN 978-81-902562-0-9.
- Zaleski, Philip; Carol Zaleski (2006). Prayer: A History. Houghton Mifflin Harcourt. ISBN 0-618-77360-6.
- Osborne, Arthur (2000). "12. Sri Ramanasramam". Ramana Maharshi and the Path of Self Knowledge. Jaico Publishing House. ISBN 81-7224-211-5. online text
- Brunton, Paul (1934). A Search In Secret India. pp. 218–225.

== Bibliography ==
- My life at Sri Ramanasramam, by Suri Nagamma. Pub. Sri Ramanasramam, 1975.
- Unforgettable Years: Memoirs of 29 Old Devotees of Bhagavan Sri Ramana Maharshi. Ed.: A. R. Natarajan. Pub. Ramana Maharshi Centre for Learning, 1990. ISBN 9788185378015.
