= Arthur Arnould =

French writer and journalist

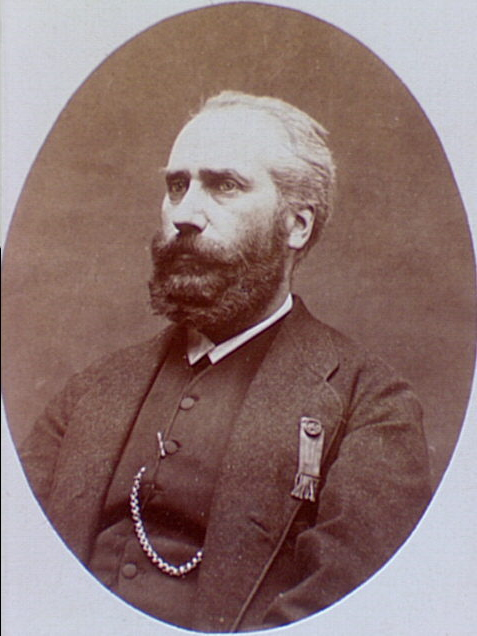
- Arthur Arnould in 1871
- Born: 17 April 1833; Dieuze
- Died: 26 November 1895 (aged 62)

Arthur Arnould (17 April 1833, Dieuze - 26 November 1895) was a French writer, and journalist.

He wrote under the pen name Arthur Matthey. He was a member of the Hermetic Brotherhood of Luxor and the Theosophical Society. He married the widowed painter Delphine de Cool in 1890. He is listed in the French dictionary of anarchists.

== Biography ==
Arnould was born into a wealthy, intellectual family. His father, Edmond Arnould, was a professor at the Collège de France.

After a short administrative career at the Seine prefecture, Arthur Arnould became a journalist opposed to the Second French Empire. He was also a Theosophy and Martinism.

First editorial secretary at the Revue nationale, then editor at the Revue moderne, he published articles on various authors, notably Edgar Allan Poe. He made his political debut in Opinion nationale and L'Époque, where he was condemned for an article, “La foire aux sottises”, in which he bluntly criticized Parisian town sergeants. He founded the Journal du peuple with Louis Noir and a number of other Marseillaise editors. He also wrote for the Avant-Garde.

After the proclamation of the Republic on September 4, 1870, he was appointed deputy mayor of the IVth arrondissement. On March 26, 1871, he was elected to the Commune Council (Paris) by the IVth and VIIth arrondissements, with 8,608 votes. He was first a member of the Commission des Relations extérieures, then of the Commission du Travail et de l'Échange (April 6), then des Subsistances (April 21) and finally of the Commission de l'Enseignement (May 4). On May 1, he was put in charge of the Journal Officiel de la Commune. Of Pierre-Joseph Proudhon and anarchist leanings, he belonged to the Council minority and voted against the creation of the Comité de Salut Public. He called for council meetings to be as public as possible, for military reports to be posted and for secrecy to be abolished.

According to Paul Delion (author of Members of the Commune and the Central Committee in 1871), Arthur Arnould was very isolated within the Council, being called both an aristocrat because of his neat appearance and a reactionary because of his protests.

After the Semaine sanglante, he fled to Switzerland, returning to France only after the amnesty of 1880. During his Swiss exile, he participated inLe Travailleur, an anarchist publication run in Geneva by Élisée Reclus and Charles Perron.

He wrote L'État et la Révolution (1877), a Histoire populaire et parlementaire de la Commune de Paris, published in 1878 in Brussels metropolitan area by Henry Kistemaeckers (publisher), and several novels under the pseudonym Arthur Matthey, Matthey named after his first wife.

In 1890, he married the artist Delphine Arnould de Cool-Fortin. He died in 1895, aged 62, having spent several years retired in their villa in Aulnay-sous-Bois, devoting himself to theosophy (president of the French branch of the Theosophical Society, he took over from Helena Blavatsky as editor of Le Lotus Bleu, and wrote several spiritualist works).
