= Charles Trochu =

French businessman, architect and politician

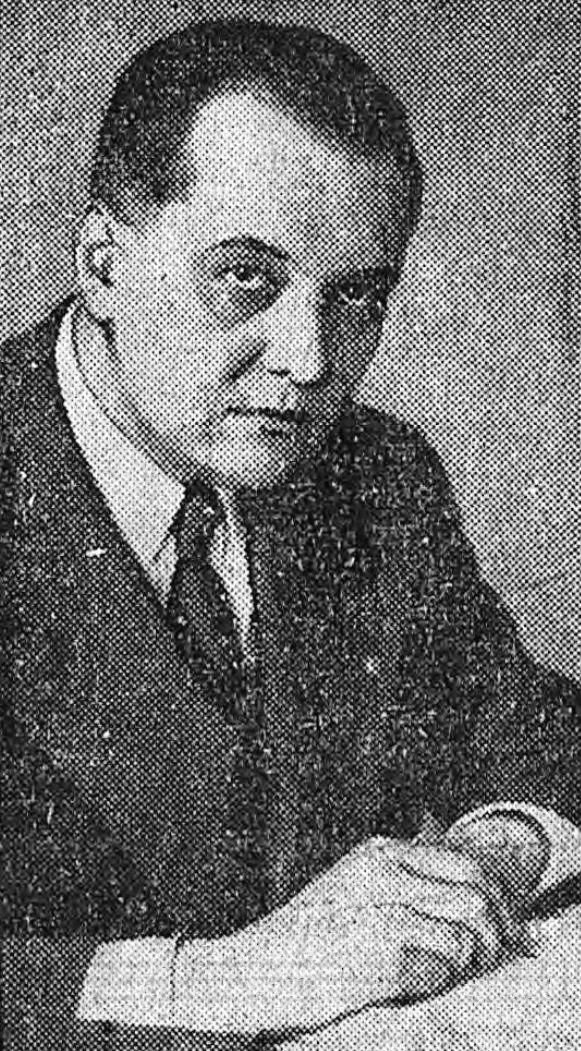
- Charles Trochu in Le Matin (1942)
- Born: 1898; Chile
- Died: 1961 (aged 62–63)
- Occupation: Architect
- Known for: Secretary General of the National Front

Charles Trochu (1898–1961) was a French businessman, architect and right-wing politician. He was Secretary General of the National Front and president of the Municipal Council of Paris.

== Biography ==
=== Early years ===
Charles Trochu was born in Chile in 1898 of a Breton father and a Basque mother. He was a descendant of the Napoleonic General Jean Baptiste Kléber. His grandfather was General Louis Jules Trochu, who had been President of the Government of National Defense during the Franco-Prussian War. World War I began in July 1914. Trochu joined the army when he was seventeen, and was wounded and decorated. He was taken prisoner by the Germans.

=== Inter-war years ===
After the war Trochu became a wholesale cod merchant. He was also involved in architecture.

Bonapartist in his background, Trochu was close to the Action Française of Charles Maurras, and participated in all the squabbles of the extreme right in the 1930s.

In 1932 he was the Jeunesses Patriotes candidate for the Paris municipal council. Violently antisemitic, he called Jews the "scum of the orient." In March 1934 he was director of journal La Révolution nationale and an executive committee member of the Democratic Republican Alliance. On 7 May 1934 he was chosen as the first secretary-general of the National Front. The Croix-de-Feu did not join. However, it was indirectly associated.

In 1935 he was elected municipal councilor for the Auteuil quarter of Paris, a position he continued to hold until being made president of the council in 1941. In 1936 Trochu and 29 other councilors proposed building underground highways so the population could be evacuated safely in case of an air attack with chemical weapons. Trochu was president of the National Association of Returned Officers, a veterans' organization. When the Spanish Civil War broke out in 1936, he used this position to recruit Frenchmen willing to fight for the right-wing forces led by General Francisco Franco. He and his private secretary, Jacques Pecheron, arranged for these men to travel to Bordeaux to join the Jeanne d'Arc Battalion being assembled by Henri Bonneville de Marsagny.

In October 1938 he called for Jewish refugees from Austria who had recently arrived in Paris to be expelled from the city. In 1938, Trochu attacked the pacifists and anti-militarists such as Jean Zay and Léon Blum who refuse to take the rearmament of Germany seriously. Thus, during the municipal council meeting of 21 December 1938, he spoke out against "ignoble Jews" such as Bernard Lecache and his friends of the International League against Racism and Anti-Semitism, which, among other infamies, trample on military honor." On 4 March 1939 in the Salle Wagram he gave Charles Maurras his sword as an academician, funded by national subscription and designed by Maxime Real del Sarte.

=== Later career ===
World War II broke out in September 1939. Trochu volunteered in 1940, and was mentioned in dispatches. He was taken prisoner, but was released after a short captivity.

A law of 16 October 1941 gave a new administrative organization to the City of Paris and the Department of the Seine under the traditional name of the Municipal Council, but with appointed rather than elected members. The PUP members remained in office, but new councilors were selected from the syndicalist workers' movement to replace the communists, an illegal party since 1940, and socialists who had been excluded because they were Jews or Freemasons. On 3 October 1941 Trochu was named president of the new assembly, before the law officially came into effect. In 1942 Trochu and Le Corbusier published a special issue of Architecture et urbanisme devoted to Le Corbusier's work.

Truchu was not considered to be conformist with the Vichy regime, and continued to push for the independence of France. The assembly was given little scope for political action. In 1943 Trochu was removed from office as president. A new administration was named on 30 April 1943 headed by Pierre Taittinger. Taittinger said later that Trochu combined the most stunning imagination with the most rigorous punctuality, and that the Municipal Council of Paris owed much to him.

After leaving office, Trochu no longer attended council meetings. Trochu managed to leave France, and arrived in allied-occupied Algiers on 12 January 1944. He was dropped from the council on 10 June 1944, shortly before the liberation of Paris. Presented as a veteran and a former member of the resistance, he testified in favor of Pétain during his trial in 1945. During the trial Trochu also said that he had "nothing but admiration" for the communists, whom he had bitterly opposed in the 1930s.

Charles Trochu died in 1961.

== Publications ==
- Architecture et urbanisme, with Le Corbusier, Paul Boulard, Pierre Winter, Paris, Les Publications techniques & librairie Charpentier, 1942.
- Hommage rendu à Charles Maurras, 2 July 1937, Paris, Front national, 1937.
- La Commune, rempart de la famille, 1942.
