= Paul Antoine Brunel =

French general (1830–1904)

Paul-Antoine Brunel
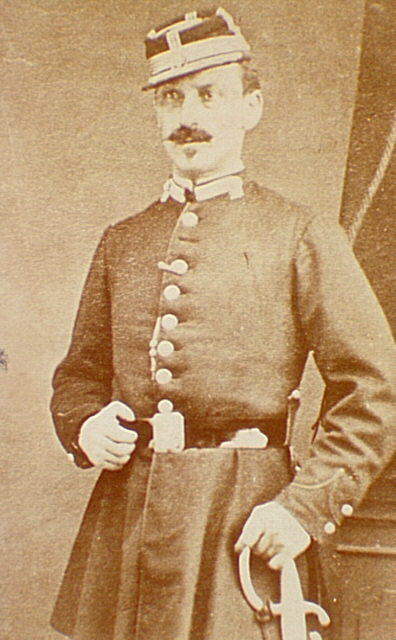
- Pronunciation: pɔl ɑ̃twan bʁynɛl
- Born: 12 March 1830; Chalmoux (Saône-et-Loire), France
- Died: 26 April 1904 (aged 74); Devon, England

Paul-Antoine Brunel (French pronunciation: [pɔl ɑ̃twan bʁynɛl]; 12 March 1830 – 1904) was a French general. He was a French lieutenant who became a leader of the Paris Commune during the Siege of Paris in 1870. He broke into Paris through the Prussian siege.

== Biography ==
Brunel was born on 12 March 1830 in Chalmoux, the son of a landowner. He was appointed a second lieutenant on 30 May 1855. As the second lieutenant in the 4th Hunter regiment, he resigned from the Imperial Army in July 1864.

=== Siege of Paris ===
During the Siege of Paris by the Germans (September 1870–March 1871), he took part in the Blanquist uprising of 31 October 1870, against the government of National Defense. On 26 January 1871, upon the announcement of the armistice with the Germans, he attempted to seize the forts in eastern Paris; he was arrested and sentenced to prison. He was released on 26 February by the National Guard.

On 18 March 1871, at the start of the Parisian uprising against the government of Adolphe Thiers, he captured the Prince-Eugène barracks. On 24 March 1871 he led the attack against the town hall of the 1st arrondissement of Paris, in the company of Maxime Lisbonne and Eugène Protot. The same day, he was named general of the commune (with Émile Eudes and Émile-Victor Duval). The 7th arrondissement elected him to the Municipal Council. He then requested his release as a general.

=== Semaine sanglante and escape ===
He was responsible for the difficult reorganization of the defense of Fort Issy. He was seriously wounded in combat during Bloody Week, but managed to escape and take refuge in England. On 2 October 1871 he received a 4th court martial and was sentenced to death. In February 1872, he received an additional sentence in absentia, to five years in prison. Brunel did not return to France.

In England, Brunel taught at the Britannia Royal Naval College and had four children. He died in Devon, England, on 26 April 1904.
