= Paul Sédir =

French mystic and esotericist

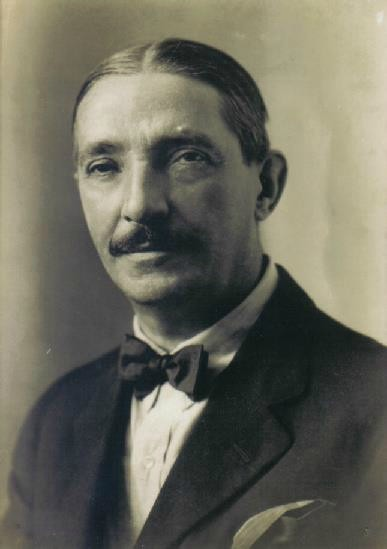

Paul Sédir or Sédir (born Yvon Le Loup; 2 January 1871 - 3 February 1926) was a French mystic and esotericist, notable as the author on several works on esotericism and Christian mysticism.

== Life ==
He was born to Hippolyte de Loup and his wife Séraphine Foeller on rue de la Lainerie in Dinan, Brittany. The couple were from Neustadt near Fulda in Germany. He was not in Brittany for long and spent most of his childhood in Paris, joining the Banque de France on 28 October 1892 as an "auxiliary agent" and remaining in the same job for twenty years in the "Dépôts de titres". He had been teaching himself about esotericism for around two, years when he met Papus (Dr Gérard Encausse) in 1889 at the "Librairie du Merveilleux" bookshop, founded by Lucien Chamuel around 1888, a gathering-place for those interested in the subject as well as a publishing house and conference hall. Papus immediately became a close friend, opening his personal library of works on symbolism, philosophy and esotericism to Le Loup, who was eager for knowledge. He began collaborating with Papus, through whom he also met Stanislas de Guaita, who also gave him access to his library. Sédir was a prolific writer and constantly contributed in writing articles for Papus' magazine Le Voile d'Isis. He was initiated into the Martinist Order, in which he became Superior Inconnu Initiateur [Superior Unknown Inititator] and a member of the Supereme Council before leaving the Order in 1910.

== Works ==
- Les Tempéraments et la Culture psychique, d'après Jakob Böhme; Chamuel, 1894.
- Les Miroirs magiques. Théories, constructions, entraînements; Chamuel, 1894. 3° éd. revue 1907
- Les Incantations. Le Verbe, le son et la lumière astrale, expériences théories de l'Inde et de Boehme; Chamuel, 1897.
- Le Bienheureux Jacob Boehme - le coordonnier philosophe. Sa vie, ses œuvres, sa doctrines, et un vocabulaire de la terminologie; Chamuel, 1897
- La Création. Théories ésotériques; Chamuel, 1898
- Les Rêves. Théories, pratique, interprétation; Beaudelot, 1900
- La Cabbale;La Maison d'Art, 1900
- La Médecine occulte - Revue de toutes les thérapeutiques : alchimique, magique, magnétique, astrale, volontaire, religieuse, théurgique; La Maison d'Art, 1900.
- Lettres magiques - Roman d'initiations orientales; Ollendorff, 1901
- Éléments d'hébreu, d'après la méthode de Fabre d'Olivet; Ollendorff, 1901
- Les Plantes magiques. Botanique occulte, constitution secrète des végétaux, vertus des simples, médecine hermétique, philtres, onguents, breuvages magiques, teintures, arcanes, élixirs spagyriques; Chacornac, 1902
- Lettres magiques, 1903.
- Les Tempéraments et la Culture psychique, d'après Jakob Böhme; Chacornac, 1906; a completely revised second edition of his 1894 work
- Le Fakirisme hindou et les Yogas. Thaumaturgie populaire. Constitution de l'homme invisible selon le brahmanisme. La force magnétique et la force mentale. Entraînements occultes; Chacornac, 1st edition 1906, 2nd considerably expanded edition, 1911
- Bréviaire mystique - Règles de conduite, formules d'oraison, thèmes de méditation; Chacornac, 1909
- Conférences sur l'Evangile. 3 volumes; Beaudelot, 1908, 1909, 1911
- La Médecine occulte - Revue de toutes les thérapeutiques : alchimique, magique, magnétique, astrale, volontaire, religieuse, théurgique; reissue of the 1900 work; Beaudelot, 1910.
- Histoire et Doctrines des Rose-Croix (1st edition 1910). Bibliothèque des Amitiés Spirituelles. Ed. 1918
- La Guerre de 1914 selon le point de vue mystique, 1910 - Conférences données à Paris en 1915 et 1916; Beaudelot, puis Bibliothèque des Amitiés Spirituelles. "La guerre actuelle selon le point de vue mystique"
- Le Martyre de la Pologne; Crès, 1917
- Le Berger de Brie, chien de France. Bibliothèque des Amitiés Spirituelles.
- En collaboration avec Papus : L'Almanach du Magiste; Chamuel, 1894–1899.
- Initiations, Albert le Grand, 1949

=== Undated works ===
- Les Rose-Croix
- Les Sept Jardins mystiques
- La Voie mystique
- Preface to Les Logia Agrapha by Emile Besson

=== Works inspired by Christianity ===
- Five commentaries on the Gospels :
  - L'enfance du Christ, édition Legrand, 1926
  - Le Sermon sur la Montagne
  - Les Guérisons du Christ
  - Le Royaume de Dieu
  - Le couronnement de l'Œuvre
- Les Amitiés Spirituelles
- Quelques Amis de Dieu
- Le Cantique des Cantiques
- Le Devoir Spiritualiste, Bibliothèque Universelle Beaudelot (1910)
- Les Directions Spirituelles
- La Dispute de Shiva contre Jésus
- L'éducation de la Volonté
- L'énergie ascétique
- Les Forces mystiques et la Conduite de la Vie
- Les Sept Jardins mystiques (1918)
- Fragments. Édition anthologique
- Initiations
- Méditations pour chaque Semaine
- Mystique chrétienne
- La Voie mystique
- La Prière
- Les Rêves
- Le Sacrifice

== Bibliography (in French) ==
- Émile Besson, Titre : Sédir,
- Max Cam, Titre : Sédir (L'homme et l'œuvre - Les Amitiés Spirituelles - Textes de Sédir - Bibliographie); Bibliothèque des Amitiés Spirituelles, 1971.
- Laurent Voegele, Titre : Sédir, une Sentinelle - Les Amitiés Spirituelles, 2019

== Publications (translated in English) ==
- Sédir, P. (2024). Historical Biography, Dreams (Theory — Practice — Interpretation), and Magic Letters (A. Avison, Trans.). Hadean Press. (Original work published 1900; Translation of 5th revised and expanded edition, 1931).
- Sédir, P., Meditations for Every Week, The Three Luminaries, 2020.
