= Paul Philémon Rastoul =

French physician

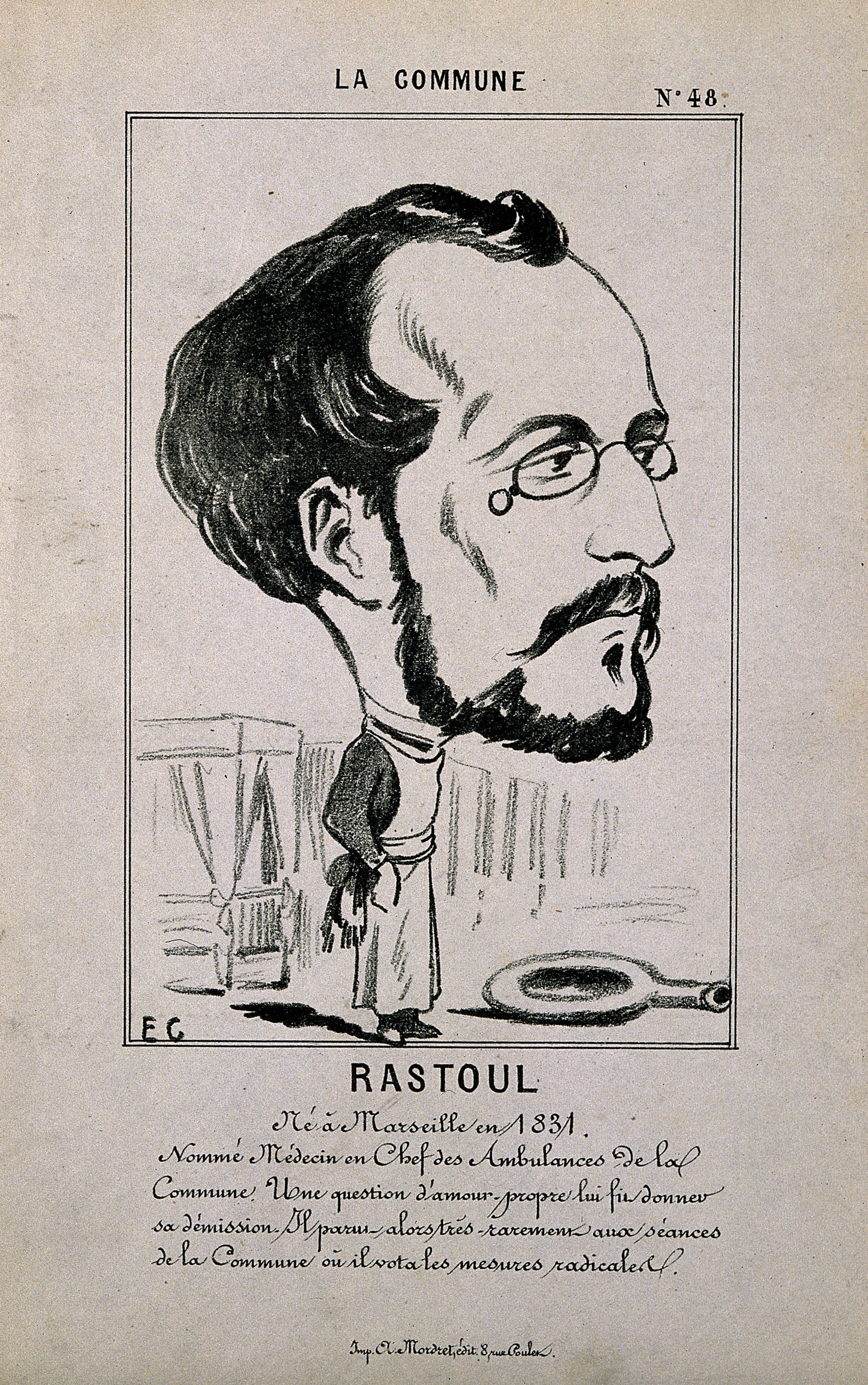
Rastoul. Lithograph by (E. C.). Wellcome V0004928

Paul Philémon Rastoul (1 October 1835; Thézan-lès-Béziers, Hérault - 1875) was a French medical doctor best known for his role in the Paris Commune of 1871. Rastoul studied medicine in Montpellier from 1855 to 1862 and moved to Paris in 1863 where he began practicing. During the Paris Commune, Rastoul was elected to represent the 10th arrondissement at the Communal Council. He was put in charge of medical services in Paris. After the Commune, Rastoul was arrested and imprisoned in France before being deported to New Caledonia in 1873 where he was allowed to practice medicine and partially recover his liberty. Following the 1874 escape of a group including Henri Rochefort, Rastoul was sent to the Isle of Pines. In March 1875, Rastoul and nineteen others attempted to escape from the island on a raft but drowned.
