= Swami Siddheshwarananda =

Swami Siddheswarananda (1897-1957) was a monk of the Ramakrishna Mission.

Gopal Marar of the Kottilil house or Tharavaad (maternal joint family) of Thrissur, was a prince of the House of Cochin, Kerala in his pre-monastic days. He was initiated by Swami Brahmananda and popularly called Gopal Maharaj. A charming person, he served as the President of the Mysore branch of Ramakrishna Math. During this time, he was instrumental in shaping the career of Puttappa, legendary Kannada poet Kuvempu. He had great regard for Sri Ramana Maharshi. He founded the Ramakrishna Ashrama at Gretz (Centre Vedantique Ramakrichna), outside Paris, France, in 1947 and spread the message of Vedanta in the French language, becoming well known in France as an author and lecturer.

Some of his writings are:

- Hindu Thought and Carmelite Mysticism ISBN 81-208-1510-6
- Le Yoga et Saint Jean de la Croix : pensée indienne et mystique carmélitaine ISBN 22-260-8621-8
- Some Aspects of Vedanta Philosophy (Lectures given at the University of Toulouse in 1942)(1979 Pbk) ISBN 0-87481-471-5
- Meditation According to Yoga- Vedanta
- Metaphysical Intuition : Seeing God with Open Eyes - Commentaries on the Bhagavad Gita, translation Andre van den Brink
- Rambles in Religion
- God-Realization through Reason
