= Commune Council (Paris) =

Government during the Paris Commune

Type
- Type: Unicameral

History
- Established: 18 March 1871; 155 years ago
- Disbanded: 28 May 1871; 155 years ago
- Preceded by: National Assembly
- Succeeded by: National Assembly

Structure
- Seats: 60 to 78 members
Committee of Public Safety
- Government of Paris
- Date formed: 18 March 1871
- Date dissolved: 28 March 1871
People and organisations
- Revolutionary Chairman: Louis Charles Delescluze (de facto)
- Commander in Chief of the National Guard: Jarosław Dąbrowski (de facto)
- Total no. of members: 92 seats
- Member party: Communards
- Status in legislature: Disbanded
History
- Election: 26 March
- Predecessor: Cousin-Montauban ministry of Charles Cousin-Montauban
- Successor: Government of National Defense under Louis-Jules Trochu
- Political groups: Communards

Elections
- Voting system: Direct election
- Voting system: Direct election
- First election: 26 March
- Last election: 26 March

The Commune Council (French: conseil de la Commune), simply known as the Commune, was the government during the 72-day Paris Commune in 1871. Following elections on 26 March, the municipal council adopted the formal name Paris Commune in its first session, implying a more revolutionary intent. The council declared itself and its name on 28 March at the Hôtel de Ville as a celebratory event. Their first proclamation followed the next day, reminding citizens of their autonomy and warning of civil war. The Commune was supported by the vast majority of Parisians. The Central Committee of the National Guard recognized and relinquished power to the Commune, but continued to organize as the "guardian of the revolution". The two groups exercised a de facto dual sovereignty.
