= Georges Thiébaud =

French journalist, Bonapartist and nationalist

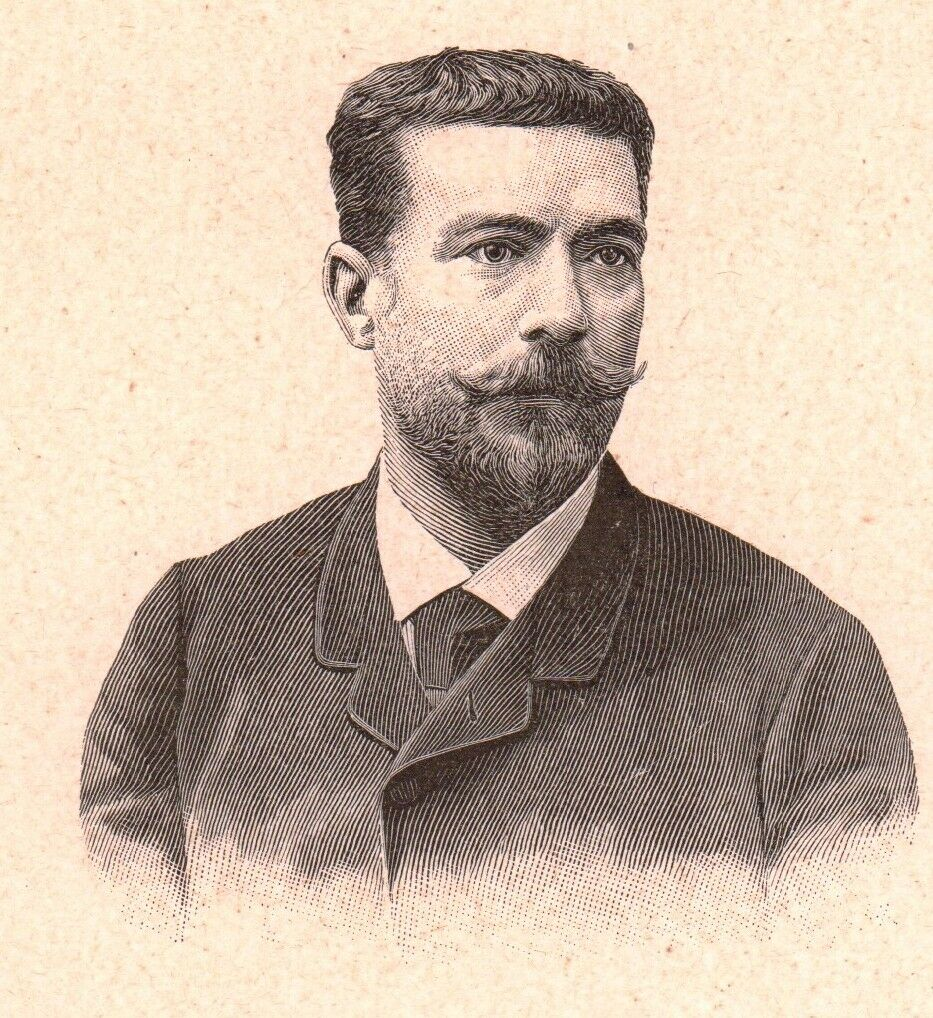
Georges Thiébaud

Georges Thiébaud (16 March 1850 in Toulouse – 21 January 1915 in Paris) was a French journalist, Bonapartist and nationalist. He and comte Dillon launched an American-style press campaign in favour of général Boulanger.

After his Boulangist engagement, he joined the antidreyfusard camp. Hostile to Protestantism, he founded an anti-Protestant league. He was accused of complicity in the coup d'état averted by Paul Déroulède in 1899.

== Publications ==
- M. Taine et le prince Napoléon, leur controverse sur Napoléon, leurs conclusions sur la France contemporaine, conférence, Paris, Dentu, 1887.
- Le Parti protestant, les progrès du protestantisme en France depuis 25 ans, conférence, Paris, Savine, 1895.
- Au-devant de Marchand, discours, Paris, Malverge, 1899.
- La Patrie française, conférence, Paris, La Patrie française, 1900.
- Le Palais de la gabegie, étude à fleur de peau de la situation municipale et des finances de la ville de Paris. Le devoir nationaliste à l'hôtel de ville, Paris, Librairie antisémite, 1900.
- Souvenirs d'un publiciste (1908-1909). Les Secrets du règne, Paris, La Renaissance française, 1909.
