= Instructions for an Armed Uprising =

Instructions for an Armed Uprising, written in 1866 by Auguste Blanqui, is a tract on revolutionary theory and a practical manual for staging an armed rebellion. It outlines the use of cadres, or ten-person clandestine militant cells, which operate autonomously of each other as a vanguard for the overthrow of a government.
