= Ernest Granger =

French politician (1844–1914)

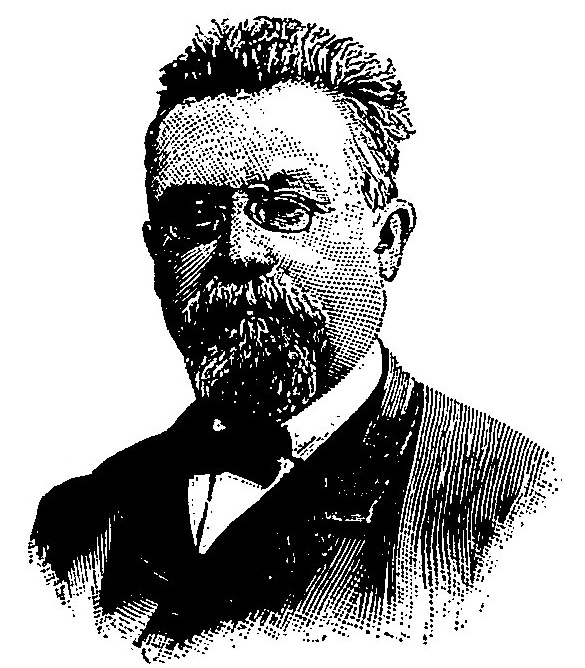
- Ernest Granger
- Born: 20 April 1844; Mortagne-au-Perche
- Died: 21 May 1914 (aged 70); Macé
- Resting place: Macé
- Occupation: Politician

Ernest Granger (20 April 1844 – 21 May 1914) was a French politician, a veteran of the Paris Commune of 1871, and a prominent leader of the Blanquist movement. Originally a revolutionary socialist who plotted the overthrow of the Second French Empire, he played a significant role in the clandestine societies of Louis-Auguste Blanqui and commanded a National Guard battalion during the Commune.

Following his return from exile, Granger became a central figure in Blanquist politics, editing influential journals such as Ni Dieu ni Maître. In the late 1880s, he led a nationalist and factional split within the Blanquist movement, aligning with General Georges Boulanger. His later political career was defined by a shift toward ardent nationalism and anti-Dreyfusard sentiment, moving away from the socialist mainstream and toward the ideological foundations of the French far-right.

== Early life: Blanquism under the Second Empire ==
Ernest Henri Granger was born in Mortagne, into a lower-middle-class family of peasant stock. He was educated at the Lycée in Versailles and studied law before breaking off his studies to devote himself to political activism. In 1866 he was imprisoned for the first time for sedition. Around this time he became involved in the clandestine revolutionary societies organised by the followers of the incarcerated veteran insurrectionist Louis-Auguste Blanqui. Together with Gustave Tridon, Émile Eudes and others, Granger plotted the overthrow of the Second French Empire. On August 14, 1870, the Blanquists struck, attempting to seize a military arsenal and spark a general uprising; Granger was one of the organisers. The uprising failed to spark a general revolt, but shortly after, Napoléon III was overthrown following the French defeat in the Franco-Prussian War (1870–71). Granger, who had avoided arrest after the August uprising, participated in the last demonstration against Napoléon III on September 1 and in the invasion of the Legislative Assembly on September 4, 1870.

== Paris Commune ==
In 1870–1871, Granger was a co-editor and contributor of the Blanquist journal La Patrie en Danger. He also commanded the 159th battalion of the National Guard and attempted to rally the French to resist the German army at all costs. On October 31, Granger and his battalion participated in an armed occupation of the Hôtel de Ville, Paris. Along with other National Guard commanders who had participated in the insurrection, Granger was relieved of command, but his soldiers re-elected him, and although he was not recognised by the Versailles government, he resumed command of the 159th battalion. Granger participated in the Paris Commune as one of the representatives of the Blanquist faction. He was given the task of finding and liberating Blanqui (whose location was kept secret by the government), but before he could complete the mission, the Paris Commune was suppressed.

== Exile and return: Blanquist politics between socialism and nationalism ==
Granger escaped England, remaining in exile in London until an amnesty enabled him to return to France. In the late 1870s and 1880s he was one of the principal editors of the Blanquist journal Ni Dieu ni Maître (Neither God nor Master). (He also contributed to L'Homme Libre and, after the death of Émile Eudes in 1888, replaced him as editor-in-chief of Le Cri du Peuple.) The Blanquists launched a campaign for the release of their aged and infirm leader, and in 1879, they managed to have Blanqui elected to the National Assembly as deputy for Bordeaux. Because Blanqui was still in prison, the election was annulled, but in 1880 he was released. After his release, Blanqui came to live with Granger and died at his home in 1881.

Shortly after Blanqui's death, Granger, together with Édouard Vaillant and others, founded the Central Revolutionary Committee, the nucleus of the Blanquist party. However, the Blanquist ideology at this time was an unstable combination of radical Jacobin republicanism, egalitarian socialism, anti-clericalism, ardent national chauvinism and a strong current of xenophobia and antisemitism. While this was not an uncommon mixture in French radical politics in the late nineteenth century, the course of events made it increasingly evident that elements of this ideological mixture were in conflict with each other. One faction of the Blanquist movement accented the socialist heritage of Blanqui and moved closer to Jules Guesde's Marxist party, rejecting antisemitism and, at least in theory, endorsing the internationalist principles of socialism. This was the course of Édouard Vaillant. Another faction moved increasingly in the direction of virulent nationalism and antisemitism. This was the course Granger took. Although his was the smaller faction, Granger, who had been personally close to Blanqui, considered himself the true standard bearer of Blanquism, and Vaillant a late interloper.

== Boulangism and the split in Blanquism ==
The conflict between Vaillantists and Grangerites brewed for some time in the Central Revolutionary Committee. It was intensified by the rise of General Georges Boulanger, who, in 1886, embarked on an increasingly powerful campaign for a revision of the constitution. Republicans generally and Blanquists in particular were divided over Boulanger. Many saw him as a latter-day Louis Bonaparte, whose populist rhetoric barely concealed his caesarian ambitions. They feared that Boulanger was preparing a coup d'état and intended to replace the Republic with his personal dictatorship, and they were alarmed by his financial and political ties to Orléanist monarchists. Other republicans believed the General's protestations of fidelity to the Republic and were attracted by his rhetoric of social reform, his revanchist desire to avenge the defeat of 1871 and retrieve Alsace-Lorraine, his reforms of the army and his anti-clerical gestures. While Vaillant was hostile to Boulanger, Granger was more and more openly sympathetic to the General's campaign.

For a while, the Blanquists papered over their differences by adopting a policy of official neutrality: the quarrel between Boulangists and bourgeois republicans was a quarrel within the bourgeoisie, in which the proletariat need not take sides. But as Boulanger's campaign gathered momentum, this position became increasingly untenable. The issue came to a head in 1888, when the Blanquists split over the candidacy of Henri Rochefort. Rochefort was a veteran republican with socialist sympathies and personal ties to many Blanquists and ex-Communards, but in the 1880s he had become a supporter of Boulanger and was running as a Boulangist candidate. Granger supported him; Vaillant supported his republican opponent Susini. The breach became irreparable; Granger and his supporters left the Central Revolutionary Committee and formed the Socialist-Revolutionary Central Committee, while Vaillant's followers renamed themselves the Socialist-Revolutionary Party. Vaillant's party moved further into the socialist mainstream, merging with the Guesdists in 1901 and with the other major socialist factions in 1905 to form the unified socialist French Section of the Workers' International (SFIO) political party. Granger and his group moved further into the slipstream of nationalism and eventually became defunct.

== Nationalism and antisemitism ==
In the late 1880s, Granger contributed to the journal L'Intransigeant. In 1889 Granger's committee entered into an electoral alliance with the Boulangists. They divided the electoral districts between them, and Granger was elected to the National Assembly for the 19th arrondissement of Paris (Seine). He served one term; in 1893 he did not stand for re-election. In the late 1890s, the Dreyfus affair further divided Granger from the mainstream of French republican socialism. The majority of French socialists followed Jean Jaurès in supporting Alfred Dreyfus, the Jewish officer falsely accused of spying for Germany, or at least maintained a policy of neutrality between the "bourgeois" Dreyfusards and anti-Dreyfusards (as Vaillant and Guesde did). However, some veteran republicans sided with those who condemned Dreyfus as a traitor. Granger was one of these. The anti-Dreyfusard campaign became increasingly openly antisemitic. Granger proclaimed himself, 'like Blanqui and Tridon, ... philosophically an antisemite' and professed his sympathy for Édouard Drumont, himself a former socialist who had migrated to the extreme nationalist right of the spectrum and was the chief apostle of antisemitism in France. Mainstream socialists saw in the anti-Dreyfus campaign an assault on the Republic and noted the anti-Dreyfusards' ties to royalist politicians; the Dreyfus Affair helped cement the socialists' official opposition to antisemitism and racism. By contrast, the Dreyfus Affair propelled Granger and a handful of others like him fully out of the mainstream of French socialism and republicanism and into currents which paved the way for French fascism in the twentieth century.

Granger did not live to witness the event which led to an eruption of nationalism in France and across Europe, torpedoing the official internationalism and anti-militarism of the Second International and dividing the mainstream socialist movement: the outbreak of the First World War in August 1914.
