= Émile Eudes =

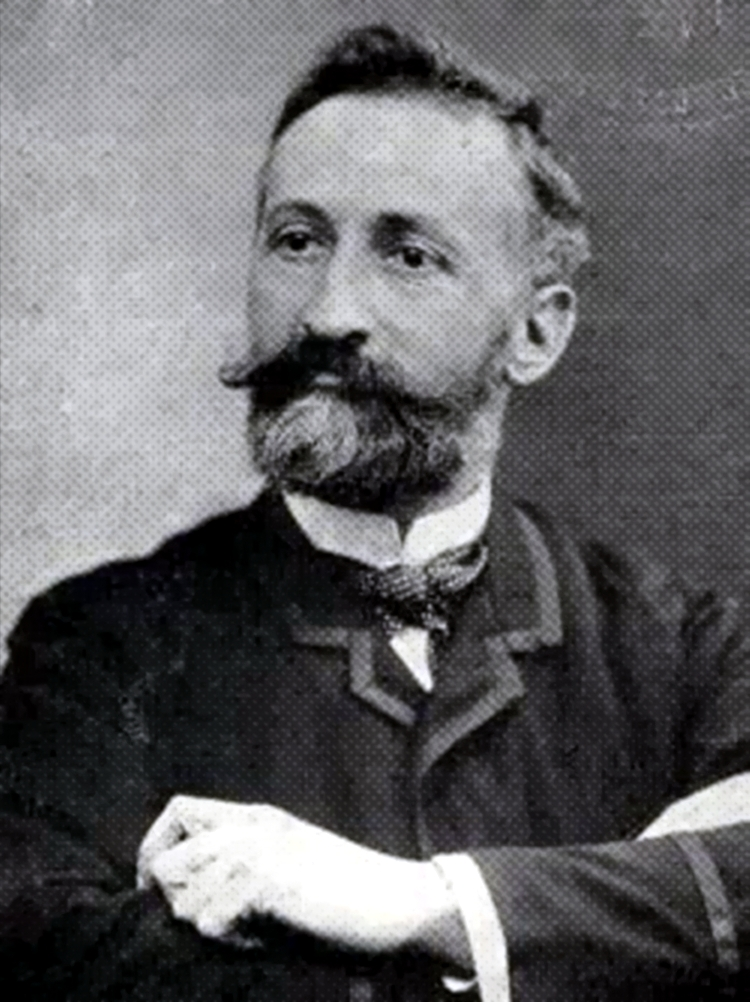
Émile Eudes.

Émile François Désiré Eudes (French pronunciation: [emil fʁɑ̃swa deziʁe ød]; 12 September 1843 – August 1888) was a French revolutionary, Blanquist socialist and participant in the Paris Commune.

== Early life ==
Émile Eudes was born on 12 September 1843 in Roncey in the English Channel. He began his medical studies in Saint-Lô and subsequently moved to Paris to specialize in pharmacology. As a convinced republican, he rejected the Second French Empire of Napoléon III. As a physician and man of science, he subscribed to the materialist philosophy then current. He was also strongly anti-clerical. He became associated with the 'free thinkers', a humanistic, non-religious movement associated with the exiled Victor Hugo. In 1866, Eudes became managing editor of the journal La Pensée Libre (Free Thought). He also briefly ran a progressive bookstore and became a freemason. Along with other free thinkers, he joined the French section of the First International. However, Eudes was drawn to a more radical ideology than the humanism of Hugo or the Mutualist doctrine of the followers of Pierre-Joseph Proudhon, who dominated the French section of the International. He joined the revolutionary socialist followers of the imprisoned veteran revolutionary Louis Auguste Blanqui. His associates included radicals like Ernest Granger, Gustave Tridon and Anne and Victor Jaclard. In 1865, the Blanquists managed to organise Blanqui's escape from prison to Belgium.

== The Paris Commune ==
In August 1870, Eudes was one of the ringleaders of an unsuccessful Blanquit insurrection at La Villette, a district of Paris. The Franco-Prussian War was then raging. Eudes, who had already had several prior arrests, was captured and sentenced to death. However, on 1 September, Napoléon III lost the battle of Sedan and was captured by the Germans. On 4 September the Third Republic was proclaimed. Eudes was released from prison. He became commander of the 138th battalion of the National Guard and helped to organize the defence of Paris against the Germans. He joined the Republican Central Committee of the Twenty Districts, which co-ordinated the activities of diverse socialist, anarchist and republican groups and prepared the ground for the Paris Commune.

Eudes was vehemently opposed to the peace negotiations undertaken by the new republican government of Adolphe Thiers. On 31 October 1870 he took part in an unsuccessful uprising against Thiers' Government of National Defence. He was not among those captured as a result. On 18 March he was at it again, leading the National Guard of Belleville in an occupation of city hall. He tried, but failed, to persuade his comrades to attack the national government at Versailles. On 24 March the Central Committee of the National Guard appointed Eudes Commissioner of War, along with Émile-Victor Duval and Paul Antoine Brunel. On 26 March he was elected to the General Council of the Paris Commune. He served on the Commune's Executive Commission and on the War Commission. He was given the rank of general for his efforts in defence of Paris. The most notable of these efforts, however, was the offensive of the Commune against the Versailles government on 3 April 1871. This offensive failed disastrously. In May, Eudes voted with the majority to establish a Committee of Public Safety, modelled on that of the first French Revolution, and became one of its members. Eudes participated actively in the fighting during the Bloody Week (Semaine sanglante), 22–28 May, that marked the Paris Commune's last stand. Somehow, he escaped the savage suppression which followed (mass arrests, summary mass executions). He escaped first to Switzerland and then to London; meanwhile, a French military tribunal sentenced him to death in absentia.

== Last Years ==
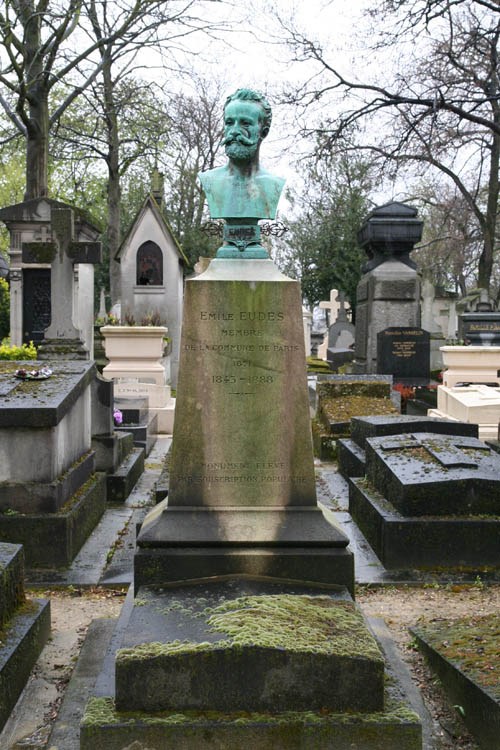
Grave of Émile Eudes.

In London, General Eudes, as he was known, lived in poverty. He took part in some of the affairs of the First International and once received a letter from Karl Marx. A general amnesty for Communards in 1880 enabled him to return home. He resumed his political activities. He contributed to the Blanquist journal Ni Dieu ni Maître (Neither God nor Master) and co-founded L'Homme Libre (The Free Man) with Édouard Vaillant. He became a member of the Blanquist Central Revolutionary Committee, founded in 1881. On 5 August 1888, Eudes was holding a particularly vehement speech at a meeting at the Salle Favié, when he suffered a cerebral haemorrhage due to an aneurism and died. He was buried at the Père Lachaise cemetery. His grave stone includes a bust of him.

== Sources ==
- Menard, J.-L., Emile Eudes, 1843-1888: Général de la Commune et Blanquiste. Dittmar: Paris, 2005.
- Noël, B., Dictionnaire de la Commune de Paris. Flammarion: Paris, 1978.
- The Great Soviet Encyclopedia. Moscow, 1979.
