= Macé =

- Commune
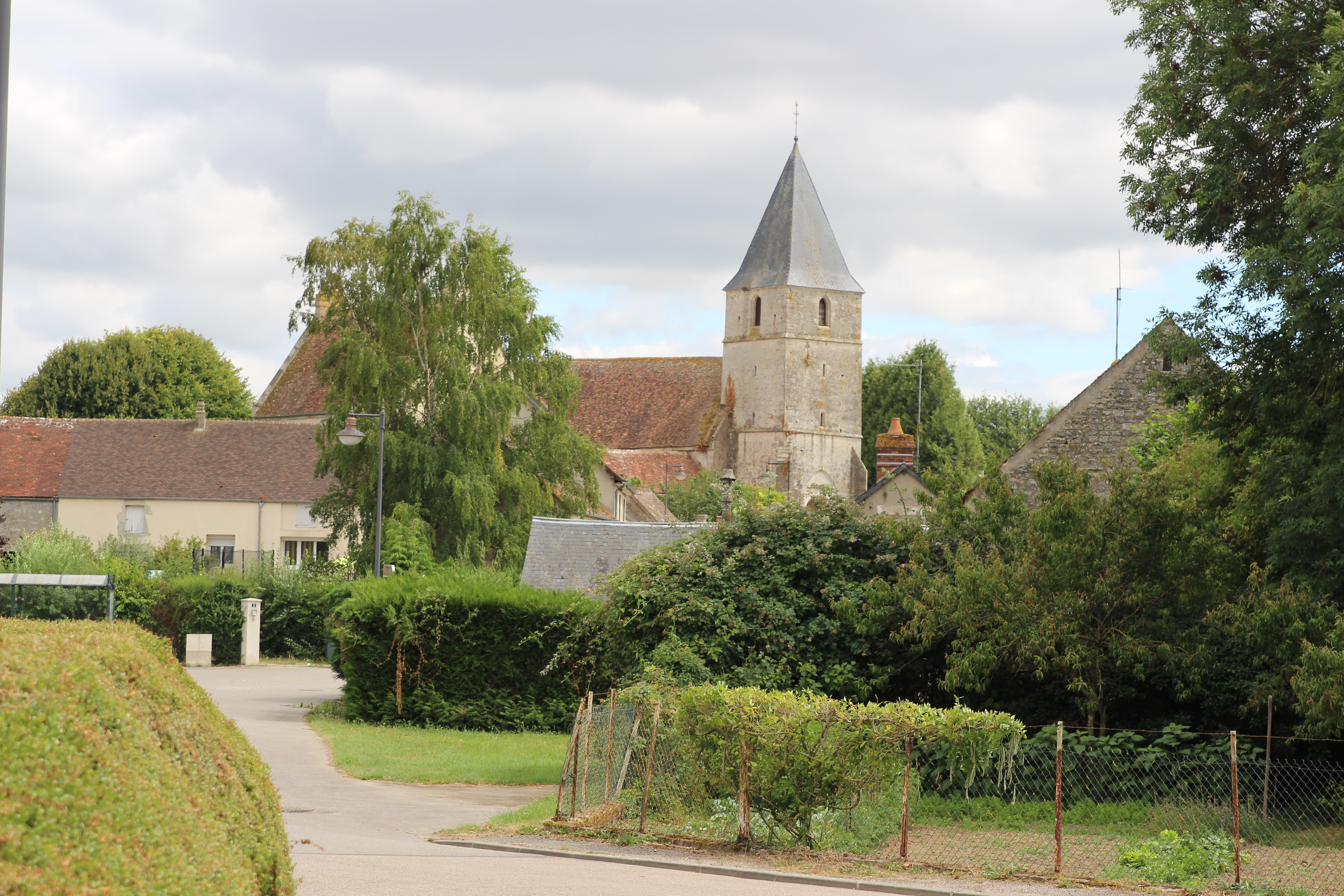
- Location of Macé
- Location within France Location within Normandy
- Coordinates: 48°38′13″N 0°08′30″E
- Country: France
- Region: Normandy
- Department: Orne
- Arrondissement: Alençon
- Canton: Sées
- Intercommunality: Sources de l'Orne

Government
  - Mayor (2020–2026): Jean-Pierre Fontaine
- Area^{1}: 14.53 km^{2} (5.61 sq mi)
- Elevation: 178 m (584 ft)
- Highest elevation: 219 m (719 ft)
- Lowest elevation: 161 m (528 ft)
- Population (2023): 460
  - Density: 32/km^{2} (82/sq mi)
- Time zone: UTC+01:00 (CET)
  - Summer (DST): UTC+02:00 (CEST)
- INSEE/Postal code: 61240 /61500
- ^{1} French Land Register data, which excludes lakes, ponds, glaciers > 1 km^{2} (0.386 sq mi or 247 acres) and river estuaries.

Macé (French pronunciation: [mase]) is a commune in the Orne department in north-western France.

== Geography ==
The commune of is made up of the following villages and hamlets, La Guitonnerie, Cité de Surdon, Ferme de Chardronnet, La Chointerie, Les Riaux, La Métairie, Mermonde, La Ferronnerie, Macé, La Pelletière and L'Abbé.

Macé along with another 65 communes is part of a 20,593 hectare, Natura 2000 conservation area, called the Haute vallée de l'Orne et affluents.

The Orne is the only watercourse that runs through the commune.

== Population ==
Historical population
Year	Pop.	±% p.a.
1968	632	—
1975	588	−1.03%
1982	491	−2.54%
1990	464	−0.70%
1999	476	+0.28%
2007	494	+0.47%
2012	473	−0.87%
2017	409	−2.87%
2023	460	+1.98%
Source: INSEE

== points of interest ==
- Coteau de la Butte-des-Rocs is a 400m2 site in the commune that is a protected area, as it contains the only known instance of the white pea lathyrus pannonicus, a type of Leguminosae, in Orne.

== Notable people ==
- Ernest Granger (1844 -1914) a French politician died and was buried here.

== See also ==
- Communes of the Orne department
