= Arthur Dillon (1834–1922) =

French cavalry officer and journalist

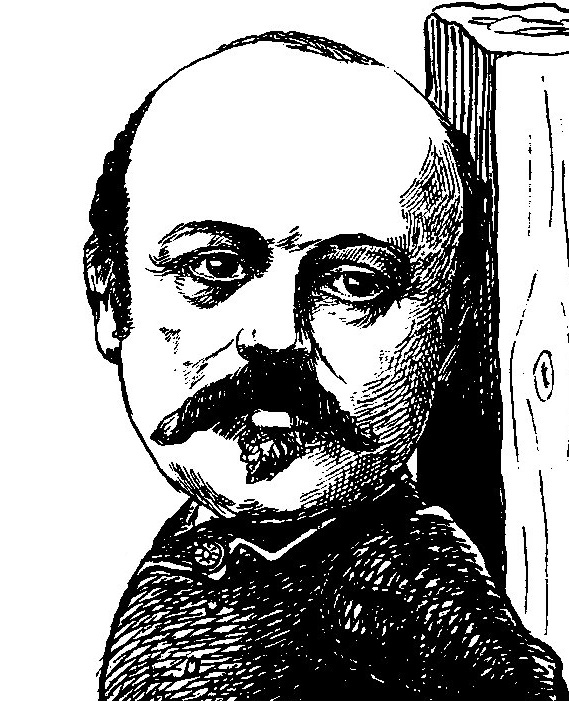
Dillon Marie

Arthur Dillon (or comte Dillon) (1834 – 1922) was a French cavalry officer and journalist, and friend of général Boulanger. He was the grandson of General Arthur Dillon (1750-1794), descended from a family of exiled Irish Jacobites.

He was secretary-general of the transatlantic cable company and a financier of Boulangisme. His election as a deputy in 1889 was invalidated. He and the Bonapartist Georges Thiébaud launched a vast journalistic campaign in Boulanger's favour.

== Sources ==
- Biographies Assemblée nationale (1889–1940)
