= Marguerite Brouzet =

Mistress of Georges Boulanger (1855–1891)

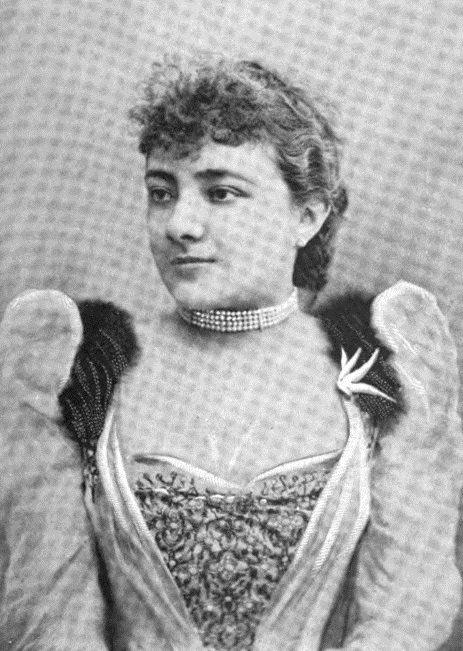
- Born: 1855
- Died: 1891

Marguerite Brouzet, Vicomtesse de Bonnemains (19 December 1855 – 16 July 1891) was the mistress of Georges Boulanger. A few months after her death, Georges Boulanger committed suicide on her grave.

== Personal information ==
Caroline Laurence Marguerite Brouzet was born into a wealthy bourgeois family. In 1874, she married Vicomte Charles-Marie Pierre de Bonnemains (1851-1916), the son of General Charles-Frédéric de Bonnemains. Therefore, she is also referred to as Madame de Bonnemains. The marriage failed and the couple was divorced in 1888. Brouzet became the lover of the French general and minister Boulanger and died of tuberculosis in his arms in July 1891. At his request, ″A bientôt″ (″See you soon″) was engraved on her tomb. Two months later he shot himself in front of her grave. His first name and ″Ai-je bien pu vivre 2 mois et 1/2 sans toi!″ (″Was I really able to live two and a half months without you!″) were added to the epitaph.

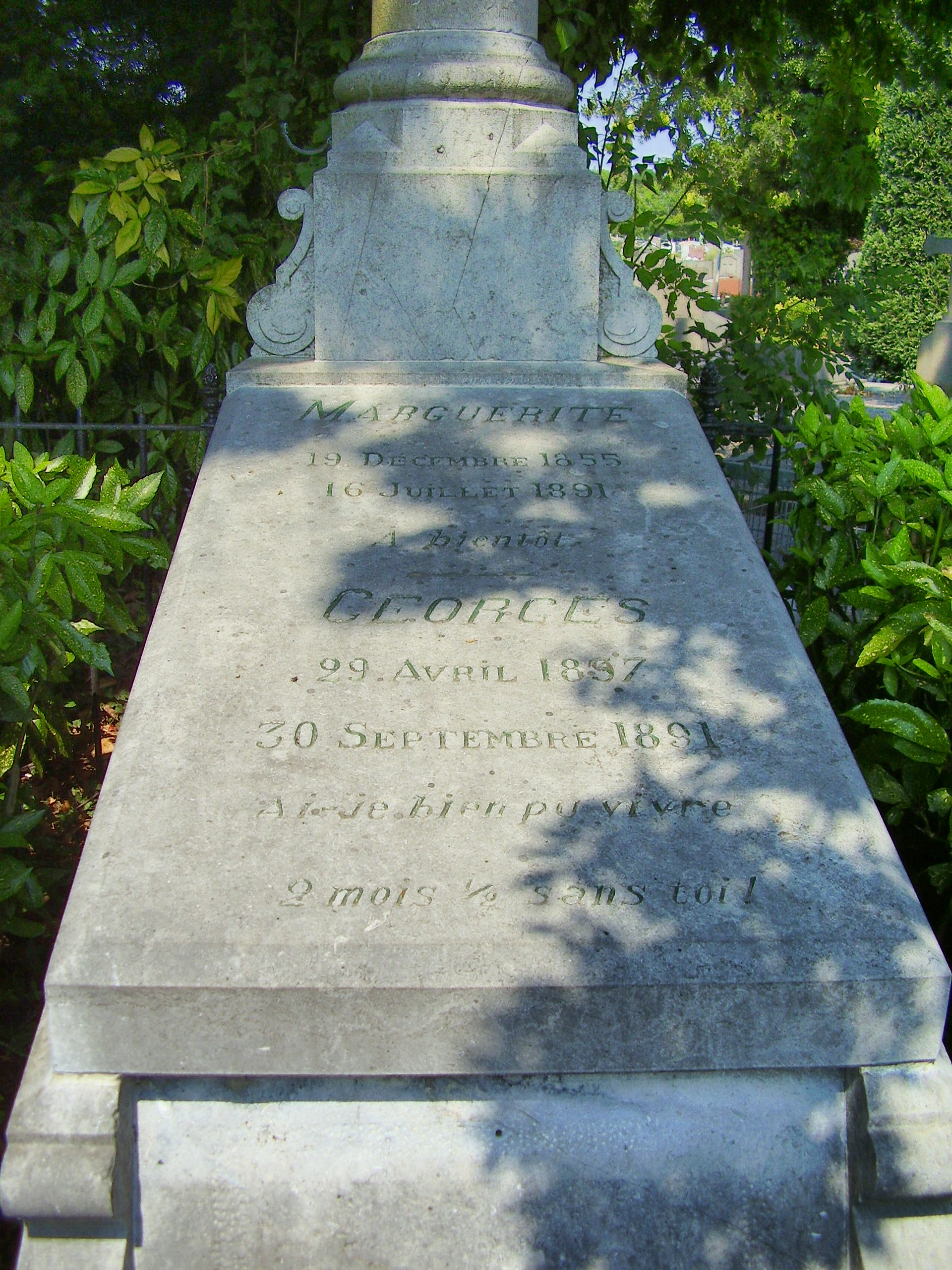
