= Georges Ernest Boulanger =

French Army officer and politician (1837–1891)

Georges Ernest Boulanger LH
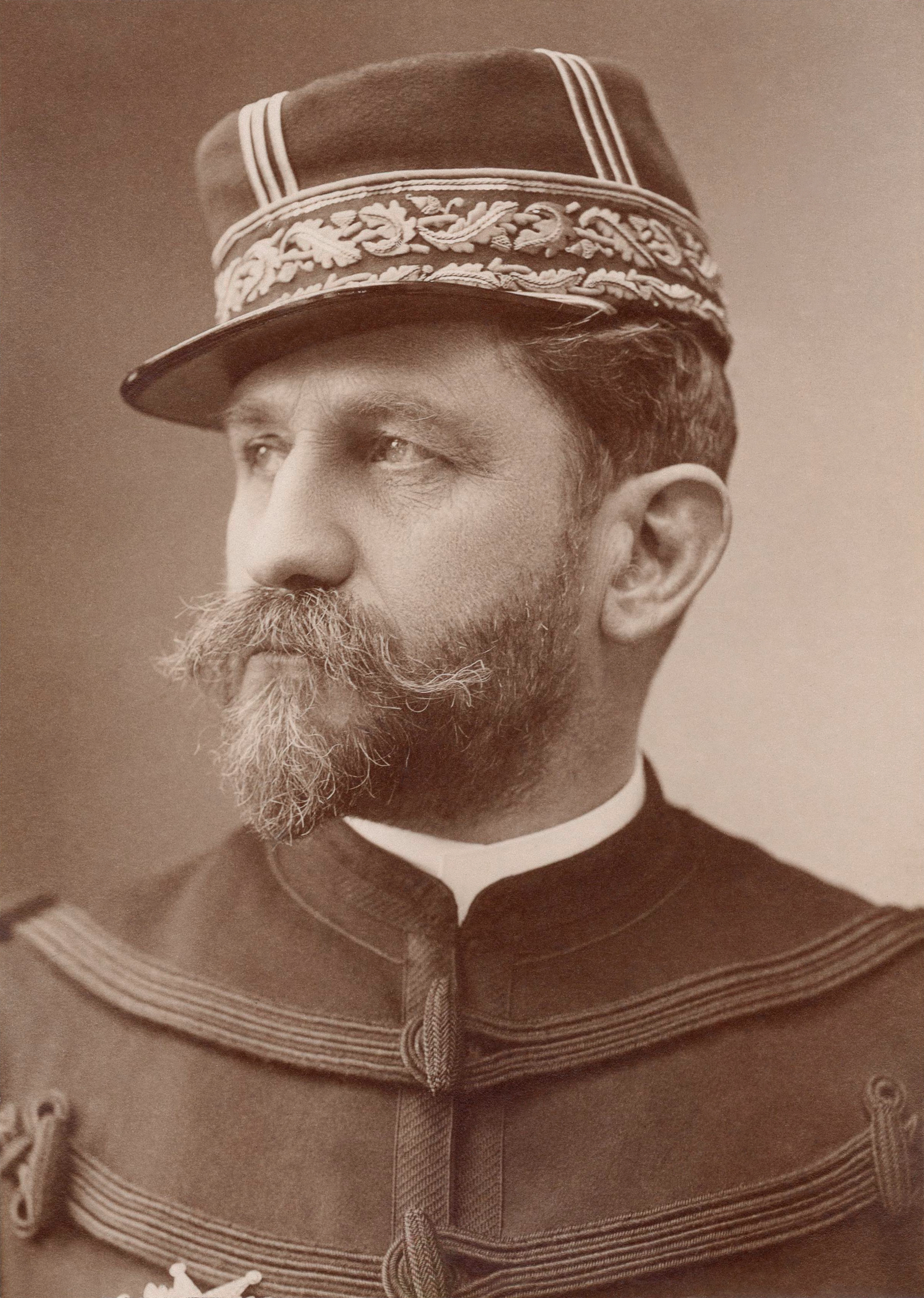
- Portrait by Nadar, c. 1880s

Minister of War
- In office 7 January 1886 – 30 May 1887
- Prime Minister: Charles de Freycinet; René Goblet
- Preceded by: Jean-Baptiste Campenon
- Succeeded by: Théophile Ferron

Member of the Chamber of Deputies
- In office 15 April 1888 – 12 July 1888
- Constituency: Nord
- In office 19 August 1888 – 14 October 1889
- Constituency: Nord

Personal details
- Born: 29 April 1837 Rennes, France
- Died: 30 September 1891 (aged 54) Brussels, Belgium
- Resting place: Ixelles Cemetery, Brussels
- Party: League of Patriots
- Spouse(s): Lucie Renouard (m. 1864–1891); his death
- Children: Hélène Marie; Marcelle
- Education: École spéciale militaire de Saint-Cyr
- Nickname: Général Revanche

Military service
- Branch/service: French Army
- Years of service: 1856–1888
- Rank: General of division
- Battles/wars: French conquest of Algeria; Second Italian War of Independence; Cochinchina campaign; Franco-Prussian War; Paris Commune

Georges Ernest Jean-Marie Boulanger (29 April 1837 – 30 September 1891), nicknamed Général Revanche ('General Revenge'), was a French Army officer and politician. An enormously popular public figure during the second decade of the Third Republic, he won multiple elections. At the zenith of his popularity in January 1889, he was feared to be powerful enough to establish himself as dictator. His base of support was the working-class districts of Paris and other cities, plus rural traditionalist Catholics and royalists. He advocated revanche (revenge on Germany), révision (revision of the constitution), and restauration (restoration of the Orléanist monarchy).

The elections of September 1889 marked a decisive defeat for the Boulangists. Changes in the electoral laws prevented Boulanger from running in multiple constituencies, and the aggressive opposition of the established government, combined with Boulanger's self-imposed exile, contributed to a rapid decline of the movement. The decline of Boulanger severely undermined the political strength of the conservative and royalist elements of French political life; they would not recover strength until the establishment of the Vichy regime in 1940. The defeat of the Boulangists ushered in a period of political dominance by the Moderate Republicans.

Academics have attributed the failure of the movement to Boulanger's own weaknesses. Despite his charisma, he lacked coolness, consistency, and decisiveness; he was a mediocre leader who lacked vision and courage. He was never able to unite the disparate elements, ranging from the far left to the far right, that formed the base of his support. He was able, however, to frighten republicans and force them to reorganize and strengthen their solidarity in opposition to him.

== Early life and career ==
Boulanger was born on 29 April 1837 in Rennes, Brittany. He was the youngest of three children born to Ernest Boulanger (1805–1884), a lawyer in Bourg-des-Comptes, and Mary-Ann Webb Griffith (1804–1894), born in Bristol to a Welsh aristocratic family (the Griffiths of Burton Agnes). His brother Ernest enlisted in the Union Army and was killed in action during the American Civil War. After attending the Lycée of Nantes, Boulanger entered the Saint-Cyr Military Academy in 1855, graduating and entering the French Army in 1856.

Boulanger first saw action in 1857 in Kabylia, during the French conquest of Algeria. He fought in the Austro-Sardinian War (he was wounded at Robecchetto con Induno, where he received the Légion d'honneur) and in the Cochinchina campaign, after which he became a captain and instructor at Saint-Cyr. During the Franco-Prussian War, Boulanger was noted for his bravery, and soon promoted to chef de bataillon; he was again wounded while fighting at Champigny-sur-Marne during the Siege of Paris. Subsequently, Boulanger was among the Third Republic military leaders who crushed the Paris Commune in April–May 1871. He was wounded a third time as he led troops to the siege of the Panthéon, and was promoted commander of the Légion d'honneur by Patrice de MacMahon. However, he was soon demoted (as his position was considered provisional), and his resignation in protest was rejected.

With backing from his direct superior, Henri d'Orléans, Duke of Aumale (incidentally, one of the sons of former King Louis-Philippe), Boulanger was made a brigadier-general in 1880, and in 1882 Minister of War Jean-Baptiste Billot appointed him director of infantry at the war office, enabling him to make a name as a military reformer (he took measures to improve morale and efficiency). In 1884, he was promoted to general of division and appointed to command the army occupying Tunisia, but was recalled owing to his differences of opinion with Pierre-Paul Cambon, the political resident. He returned to Paris, and began to take part in politics under the aegis of Georges Clemenceau and the Radicals. In January 1886, when Charles de Freycinet was brought into power, Clemenceau used his influence to secure Boulanger's appointment as War Minister (replacing Jean-Baptiste Campenon). Clemenceau assumed Boulanger was a republican, because he was known not to attend Mass. However Boulanger would soon prove himself a conservative and monarchist.

== Minister of War ==
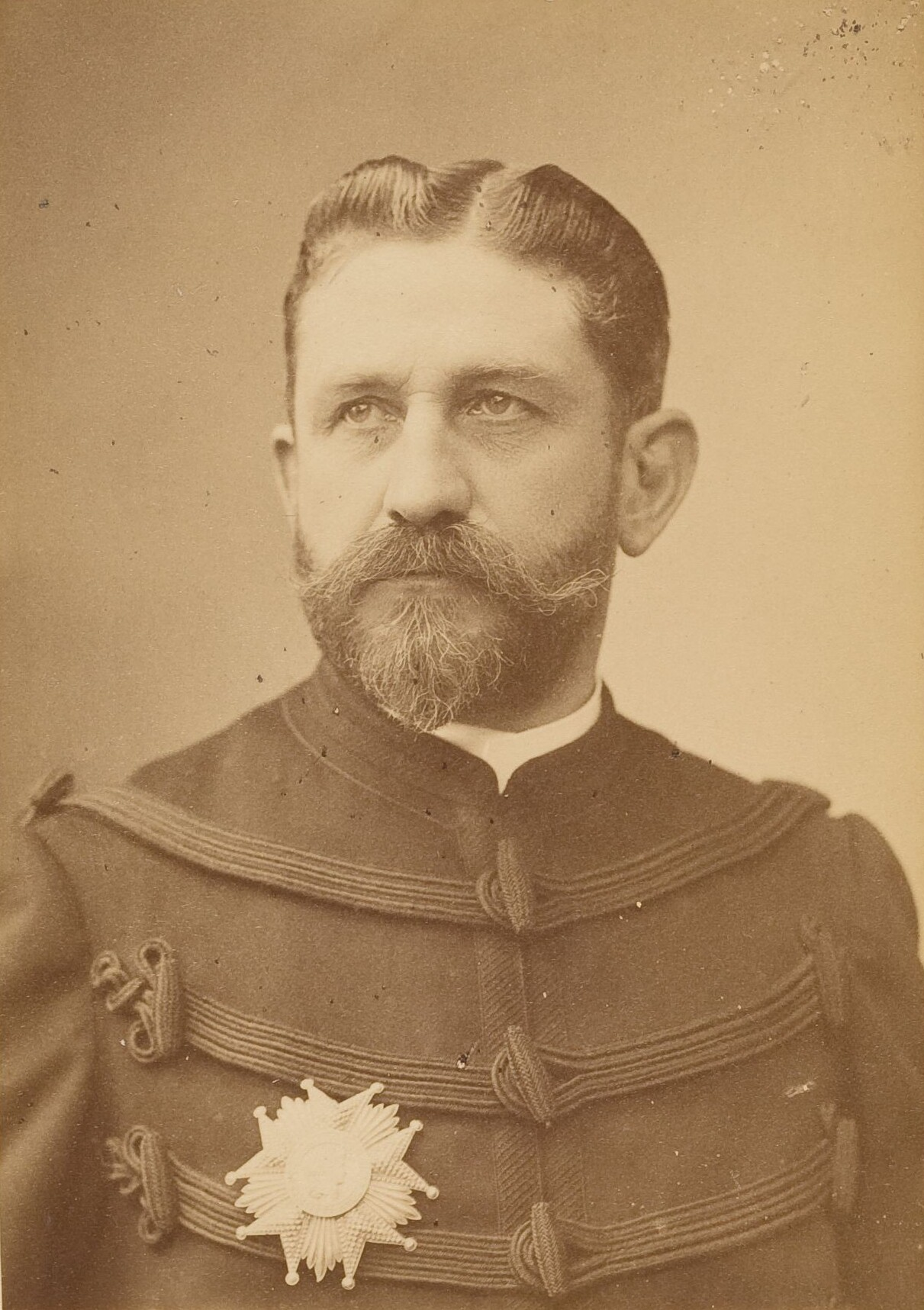
Portrait of Boulanger by Nadar

It was in the capacity of Minister of War that Boulanger gained most popularity. He introduced reforms for the benefit of soldiers (such as allowing soldiers to grow beards) and appealed to the French desire for revenge against Imperial Germany—in doing so, he came to be regarded as the man destined to serve that revenge (nicknamed Général Revanche). He also managed to quell the major workers' strike in Decazeville. A minor scandal arose when Philippe, comte de Paris, the nominal inheritor of the French throne in the eyes of Orléanist monarchists, married his daughter Amélie to Portugal's Carlos I, in a lavish wedding that provoked fears of anti-Republican ambitions. The French parliament hastily passed a law expelling all possible claimants to the crown from French territories. Boulanger communicated to d'Aumale his expulsion from the armed forces. He received the adulation of the public and the press after the Sino-French War, when France's victory added Tonkin to its colonial empire.

He also vigorously pressed for the accelerated adoption, in just first five months of 1886, of a new rifle for the technically revolutionary smokeless powder Poudre B developed by P. Vielle two years earlier. Essentially, that backfired: the hastily developed 8×50mmR Lebel cartridge became an unprecedented high-velocity ammunition but due to its double taper and rim the French firearm development was handicapped for decades to come, and the hastily designed Lebel Model 1886 rifle, essentially a strengthened Kropatschek rifle from late 1870s, became obsolete much faster than any of the magazine rifles of other European militaries that followed during late 1880s and 1890s (before Boulanger, the French military planned to adopt a much more modern design as well). Boulanger also ordered to produce a million rifles by May 1887, but his proposal on how to achieve this was entirely unrealistic (even with the best efforts in manufacturing it took several years).

On Freycinet's defeat in December of the same year, Boulanger was retained by René Goblet at the war office. Confident of political support, the general began provoking the Germans; he ordered military facilities to be built in the border region of Belfort, forbade the export of horses to German markets, and even instigated a ban on presentations of Lohengrin. Germany responded by calling to arms more than 70,000 reservists in February 1887. After the Schnaebele incident (April 1887), war was averted, but Boulanger was perceived by his supporters as coming out on top against Bismarck. For the Goblet government, Boulanger was an embarrassment and risk, and became engaged in a dispute with Foreign Minister Émile Flourens. On 17 May Goblet was voted out of office and replaced by Maurice Rouvier. The latter sacked Boulanger, and replaced him with Théophile Adrien Ferron on 30 May.

== The rise of Boulangisme ==
The government was astonished by the revelation that Boulanger had received around 100,000 votes for the partial election in Seine, without even being a candidate. He was removed from the Paris region and sent to the provinces, appointed commander of the troops stationed in Clermont-Ferrand. Upon his departure on 8 July, a crowd of ten thousand took the Gare de Lyon by storm, covering his train with posters titled Il reviendra ('He will come back'), and blocking the railway, but he was smuggled out.

The general decided to gather support for his own movement, an eclectic one that capitalized on the frustrations of French conservatism, advocating the three principles of revanche (revenge on Germany), révision (revision of the constitution), and restauration (restoration of the monarchy). The common reference to it has become Boulangisme, a term used by its partisans and adversaries alike. Immediately, the new popular movement was backed by notable conservative figures such as Count Arthur Dillon, Alfred Joseph Naquet, Anne de Rochechouart de Mortemart (Duchess of Uzès, who financed him with immense sums), Arthur Meyer, Paul Déroulède (and his Ligue des Patriotes).

After the political corruption scandal surrounding President Jules Grévy’s son-in-law Daniel Wilson, who was secretly selling Légion d'honneur medals, the Republican government was brought into disrepute and Boulanger's popular appeal rose in contrast. His position became essential after Grévy was forced to resign due to the scandal: in January 1888, the boulangistes promised to back any candidate for the presidency that would in turn offer his support to Boulanger for the post of War Minister (France was a parliamentary republic). The crisis was cut short by the election of Sadi Carnot and the appointment of Pierre Tirard as Prime Minister—Tirard refused to include Boulanger in his cabinet. During the period, Boulanger was in Switzerland, where he met with Prince Napoléon-Jérôme Bonaparte, technically a Bonapartist, who offered his full support to the cause. The Bonapartists had attached themselves to the general, and even the Comte de Paris encouraged his followers to support him. Once seen as a republican, Boulanger showed his true colors in the camp of the conservative monarchists. On 26 March 1888 he was expelled from the army. The day after, Daniel Wilson had his imprisonment repealed. It seemed to the French people that honorable generals were punished while corrupt politicians were spared, further increasing Boulanger's popularity.

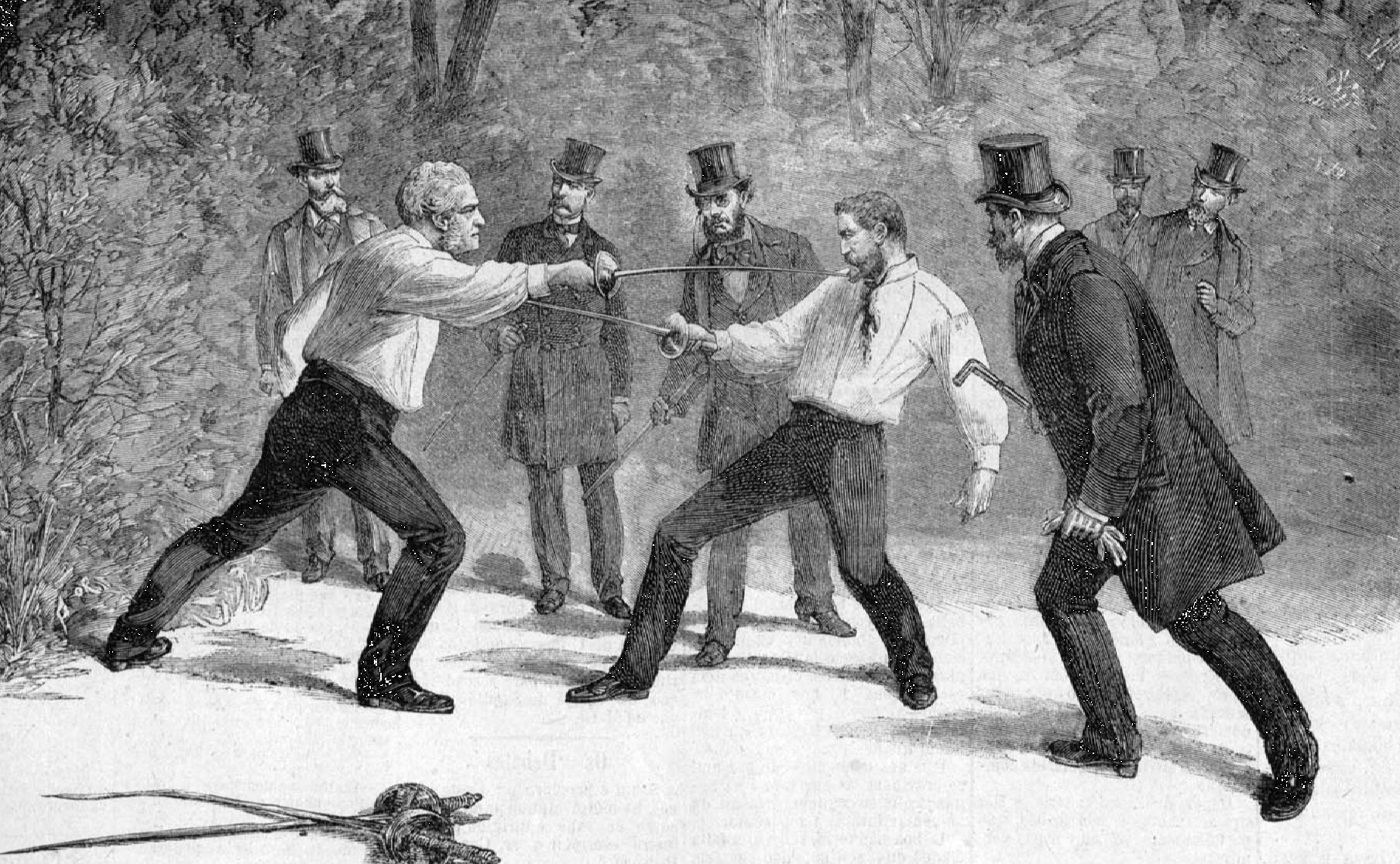
The duel between Charles Floquet and General Boulanger in 1888

Although he was not a legal candidate for the French Chamber of Deputies (since he was a military man), Boulanger ran with Bonapartist backing in seven separate départements during the remainder of 1888. Boulangiste candidates were present in every département. Consequently, he and many of his supporters were voted to the Chamber, and accompanied by a large crowd on 12 July, the day of their swearing in—the general himself was elected in the constituency of Nord. The boulangistes were, nonetheless, a minority in the Chamber. Since Boulanger could not pass legislation, his actions were directed to maintaining his public image. Neither his failure as an orator nor his defeat in a duel with Charles Thomas Floquet, then an elderly civilian and both Prime Minister and Minister of the Interior, reduced the enthusiasm of his popular following.

During 1888 his personality was the dominating feature of French politics, and, when he resigned his seat as a protest against the reception given by the Chamber to his proposals, constituencies vied with one another in selecting him as their representative. His name was the theme of the popular song C'est Boulanger qu'il nous faut ('Boulanger is the One We Need'), he and his black horse became the idol of the Parisian population, and he was urged to run for the presidency. The general agreed, but his personal ambitions soon alienated his republican supporters, who recognised in him a potential military dictator. Numerous monarchists continued to give him financial aid, even though Boulanger saw himself as a leader rather than a restorer of kings.

== Downfall ==
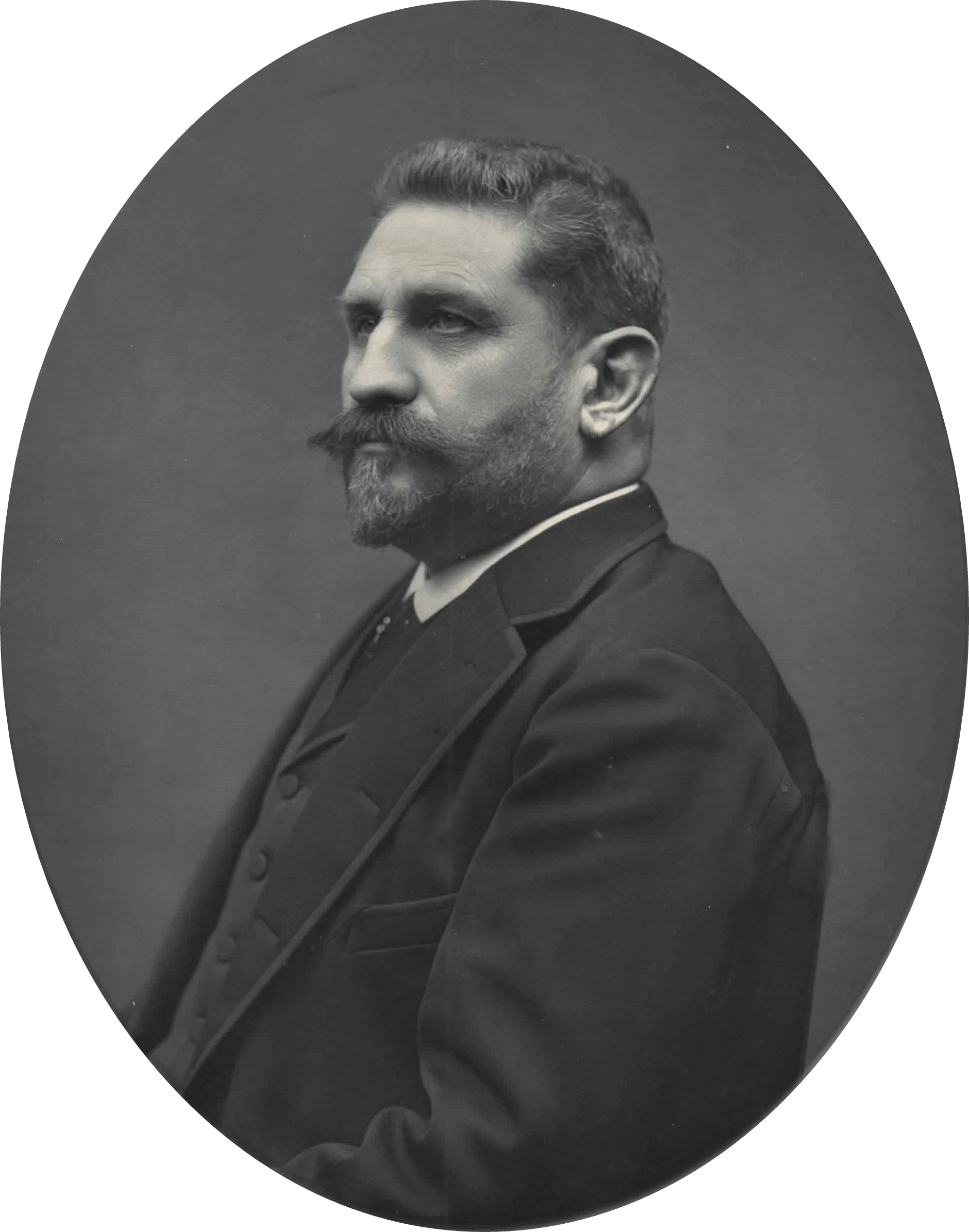
Woodburytype / carbon print of General Boulanger, aged 52 (1889). Photographed by Herbert R. Barraud

In January 1889, he ran as a deputy for Paris, and, after an intense campaign, took the seat with 244,000 votes against the 160,000 of his main adversary. A coup d'état seemed probable and desirable among his supporters. Boulanger had now become a threat to the parliamentary Republic. Had he immediately placed himself at the head of a revolt he might have effected the coup which many of his partisans had worked for, and might even have governed France; but the opportunity passed with his procrastination on 27 January. According to Lady Randolph Churchill, "all his thoughts were centered in and controlled by her who was the mainspring of his life. After the plebiscite...he rushed off to Madame Bonnemain's house and could not be found".

Boulanger decided that it would be better to contest the general election and take power legally. This, however, gave his enemies the time they needed to strike back. Ernest Constans, the Minister of the Interior, decided to investigate the matter, and attacked the Ligue des Patriotes using the law banning the activities of secret societies.

Shortly afterward the French government issued a warrant for Boulanger's arrest for conspiracy and treasonable activity. To the astonishment of his supporters, on 1 April he fled Paris before it could be executed, going first to Brussels and then to London. On 4 April the Parliament stripped him of his immunity from prosecution; the French Senate condemned him and his supporters, Rochefort, and Count Dillon for treason, sentencing all three to deportation and confinement.

In 1890 Le Figaro caused a sensation by alleging that Boulanger's London promoter Alexander Meyrick Broadley had taken Boulanger and Rochefort to the male brothel at the centre of the Cleveland Street scandal, an allegation that Dillon was forced to publicly deny.

== Death ==
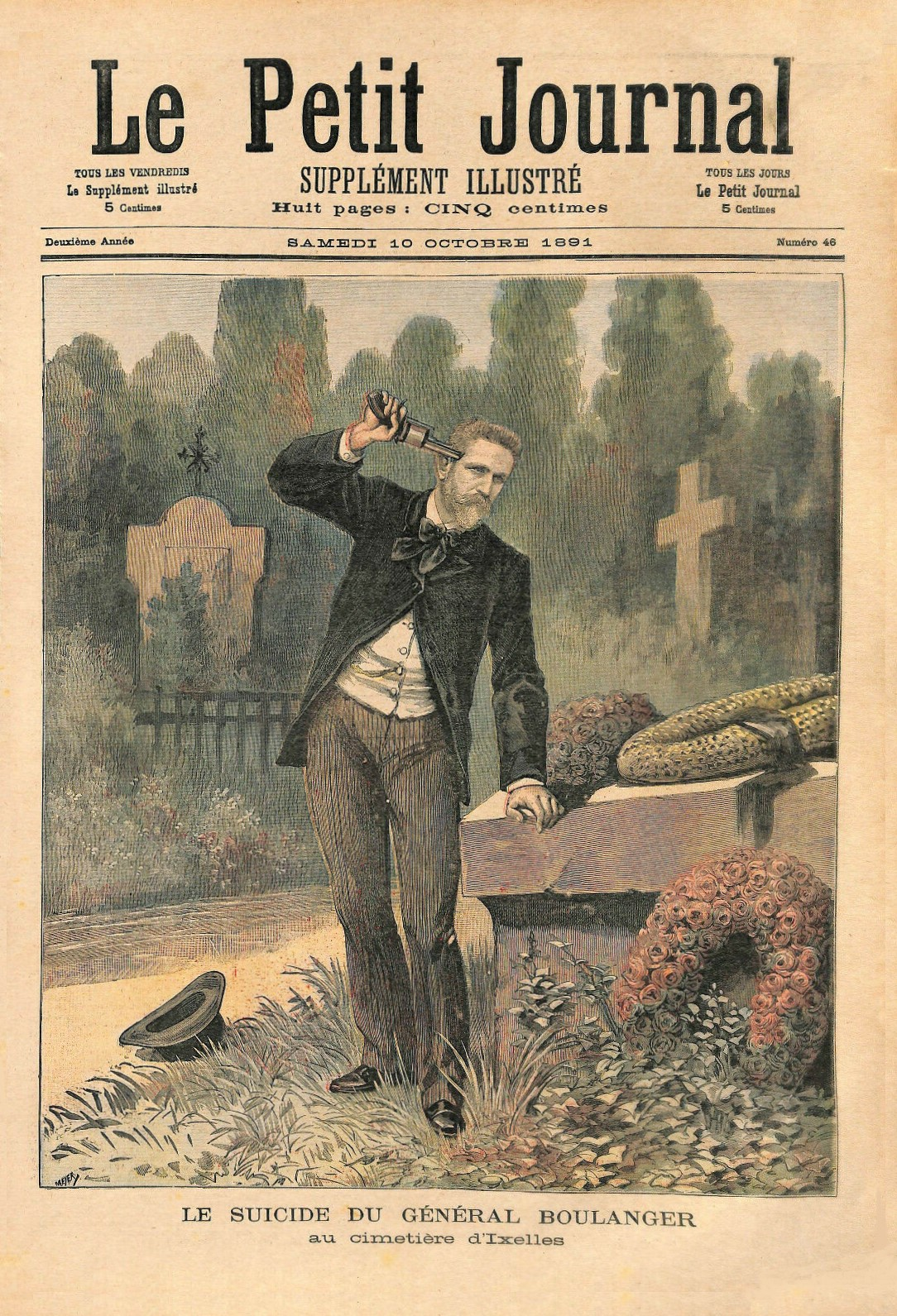
Boulanger's suicide, as reported in Le Petit Journal (10 October 1891)

After his flight, support for him dwindled, and the Boulangists were defeated in the general elections of July 1889 (after the government forbade Boulanger from running). Boulanger himself went to live in Jersey before returning to the Ixelles Cemetery in Brussels in September 1891 to kill himself with a bullet to the head on the grave of his mistress, Madame de Bonnemains (née Marguerite Brouzet) who had died in his arms the preceding July. He was buried in the same grave.

== Boulangist movement ==
Some historians viewed the Boulangist movement as a proto-fascist right-wing movement. A number of scholars have presented Boulangism as a precursor of fascism, including Zeev Sternhell.

France's traditional right was based in followers of the Catholic Church in France and customarily led by members of the French nobility whose ancestors had survived the Reign of Terror, but Boulanger's new movement was based on mass populist following that was national, rather than merely religious or class-based. As Jacques Néré says, "Boulangism was first and foremost a popular movement of the extreme left". Irvine says he had some royalist support but that, "Boulangism is better understood as the coalescence of the fragmented forces of the Left." This interpretation is part of a consensus that the ideology of France's radical right was formed in part during the Dreyfus era by men, ironically, who had been Boulangist partisans of the Far Left a decade earlier.

For example, Boulanger had the support of a number of former Communards from the Paris Commune and some supporters of Blanquism (a faction within the Central Revolutionary Committee). This included men such as Victor Jaclard, Ernest Granger and Henri Rochefort.

== In popular culture ==
Général Boulanger inspired the 1956 Jean Renoir movie Elena and Her Men, a musical fantasy loosely based on the end of his political career. The role of Général François Rollan, a Boulanger-like character, was played by Jean Marais.

IMDb notes that there was also a French television programme about Boulanger in the early 1980s, Nuit du général Boulanger ('General Boulanger's Night'), in which Boulanger is played by Maurice Ronet.

He is quoted as the one who authorised the institution of the "Suicide Bureau" in Guy de Maupassant's short story "The Magic Couch", reportedly "the only good thing he did".

Maurice Leblanc also mentions him in his 1924 novel The Countess of Cagliostro.

Political offices
Preceded by Jean-Baptiste Campenon	Minister of War; 7 January 1886 – 30 May 1887	Succeeded by Théophile Adrien Ferron
