= Louis-Auguste Blanqui =

French socialist revolutionary (1805–1881)

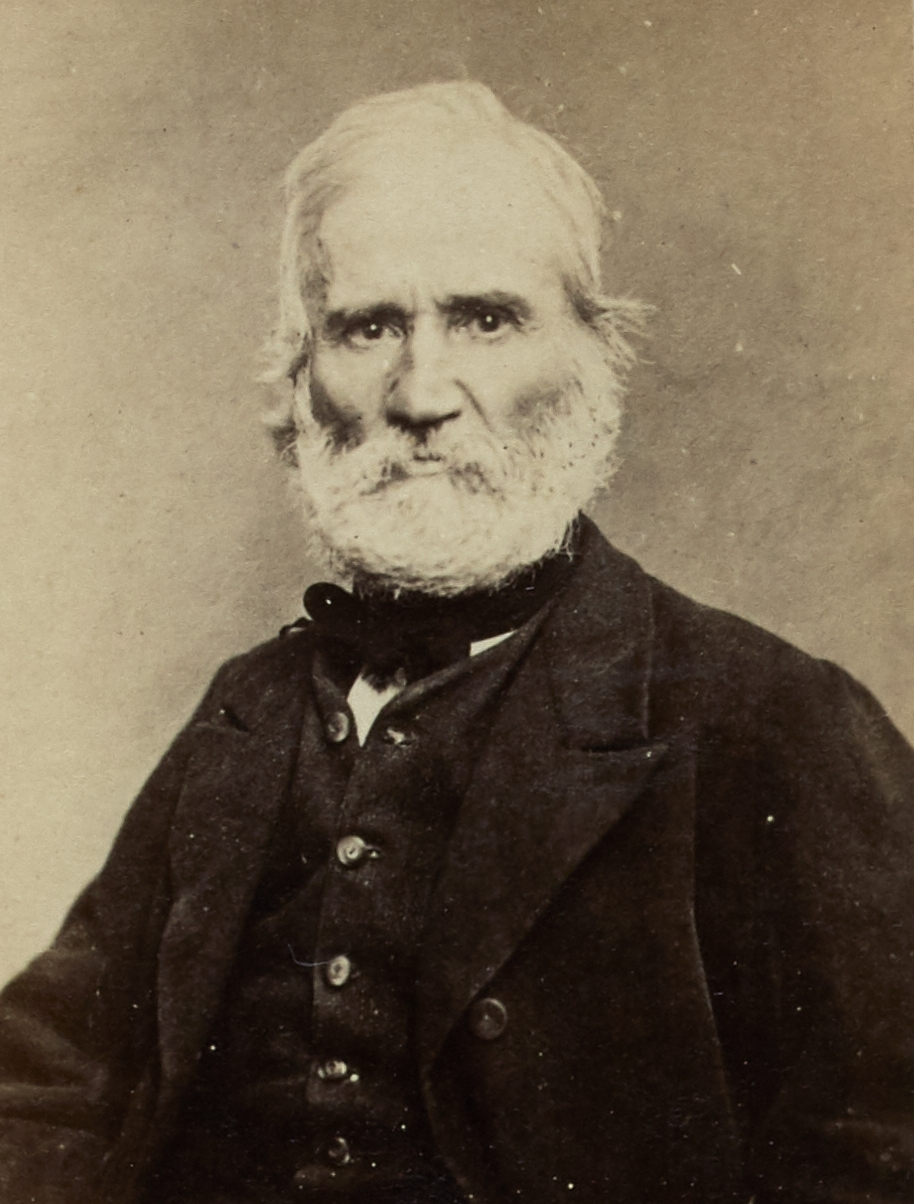
- Blanqui c. 1870
- Born: 8 February 1805; Puget-Théniers, Alpes-Maritimes, France
- Died: 1 January 1881 (aged 75); Paris, France
- Other name: L'Enfermé (The Prisoner)
- Education: Lycée Charlemagne; University of Paris
- Known for: Blanquism
- Movement: Neo-Jacobinism, Communism
- Relatives: Adolphe Blanqui (brother)

Louis-Auguste Blanqui (French: [blɑ̃ki]; 8 February 1805 – 1 January 1881) was a French socialist revolutionary and philosopher. A pivotal figure of the 19th-century French radical left, he was a staunch advocate for communism and a proponent of the revolutionary theory that came to be known as Blanquism. His political career was marked by a relentless opposition to all forms of monarchy and capitalism, leading to his repeated imprisonment by every French regime of his lifetime. He spent 33 of his 75 years in prison, earning him the nickname L'Enfermé ("The Prisoner").

Blanqui's political thought was shaped by the legacy of the French Revolution, particularly its radical Jacobin phase. He argued for the necessity of a highly organised, revolutionary vanguard to seize power on behalf of the working class. Once in power, this vanguard would establish a temporary revolutionary dictatorship, centred in Paris, tasked with disarming the bourgeoisie, arming the proletariat, and implementing a programme of mass education. He believed that only after a period of enlightenment, which would eradicate the ignorance he saw as the root of oppression, could a truly egalitarian and communist society be established.

A key figure in the major popular uprisings of his era, Blanqui participated in the July Revolution of 1830 and was a leading voice in the radical clubs of the French Revolution of 1848. His attempts to channel popular discontent into successful insurrections, notably in May 1839 and August 1870, were unsuccessful and resulted in long prison sentences. He was arrested just before the Paris Commune of 1871 and was unable to participate, though many of his followers played key roles.

During his lifetime, Blanqui was both a revered and reviled figure. Early in his career, Karl Marx identified him as the foremost leader of the French proletariat. However, later Marxist critiques, particularly from Friedrich Engels, defined "Blanquism" as a pejorative term for naive, conspiratorial putschism led by a small elite, a characterisation that has largely shaped his posthumous reputation. Despite being largely forgotten by mainstream socialism, his life and extensive writings present a developed theory of popular empowerment based on conscious political volition, organisation, and the rejection of historical determinism.

== Biography ==
=== Early life and revolutionary beginnings ===
Louis-Auguste Blanqui was born on 8 February 1805 in Puget-Théniers, a small town in the Alpes-Maritimes department of south-east France. His father, Jean Dominique Blanqui, had been a Girondist deputy in the National Convention during the French Revolution and was later appointed sub-prefect of Puget-Théniers by Napoleon. At the age of 13, Louis-Auguste was sent to Paris to study at the Institution Massin, where his older brother Jérôme-Adolphe was a teacher. He excelled as a student, graduating from the Lycée Charlemagne with honours in 1824 and beginning to study both law and medicine at the Sorbonne in 1826.

During the 1820s, Blanqui became deeply involved in republican and revolutionary politics. In 1822, he was profoundly affected by witnessing the execution of the four sergeants of La Rochelle, an event he later cited as the origin of his "declaration of war upon all factions that represent the past". He joined the French section of the Carbonari, a secret society dedicated to overthrowing the monarchy, in 1824. In 1827, he participated in a series of popular protests against the Bourbon monarchy of King Charles X, during which he was injured on three separate occasions, including receiving a near-fatal bullet wound to the neck. The street fighting of 1827 marked a political turning point for Blanqui, who transitioned from Bonapartism to Jacobin republicanism, convinced that power lay with the people in the streets.

Blanqui was working as a parliamentary reporter for the liberal journal Le Globe when the July Revolution of 1830 began; leaving his legalistic employers, he joined the uprising. His role in the revolution, which overthrew Charles X, was recognised by the new Orléanist regime with the Decoration of July. However, Blanqui was profoundly disillusioned by the outcome of the revolution, which replaced one monarchy with another under Louis Philippe I. He witnessed what he saw as the betrayal of the popular uprising by the bourgeoisie, an experience that became the formative event of his political life, crystallising his commitment to a more radical transformation of society.

=== Conspiracies and imprisonment ===
In the period following the July Revolution, known as le temps des émeutes ("the time of riots"), Blanqui became a prominent orator in the republican opposition. At his trial in 1832, he famously declared his profession to be "proletarian" and outlined a vision of class war between the rich and the poor, cementing his reputation on the radical left. Concluding that mere riots were insufficient to challenge the established order, which was protected by censorship and armed force, he, like many of his contemporaries, turned to disciplined conspiratorial organisation. He was influenced by the revolutionary communist Philippe Buonarroti, absorbing his elitist and hierarchical conspiratorial methods.

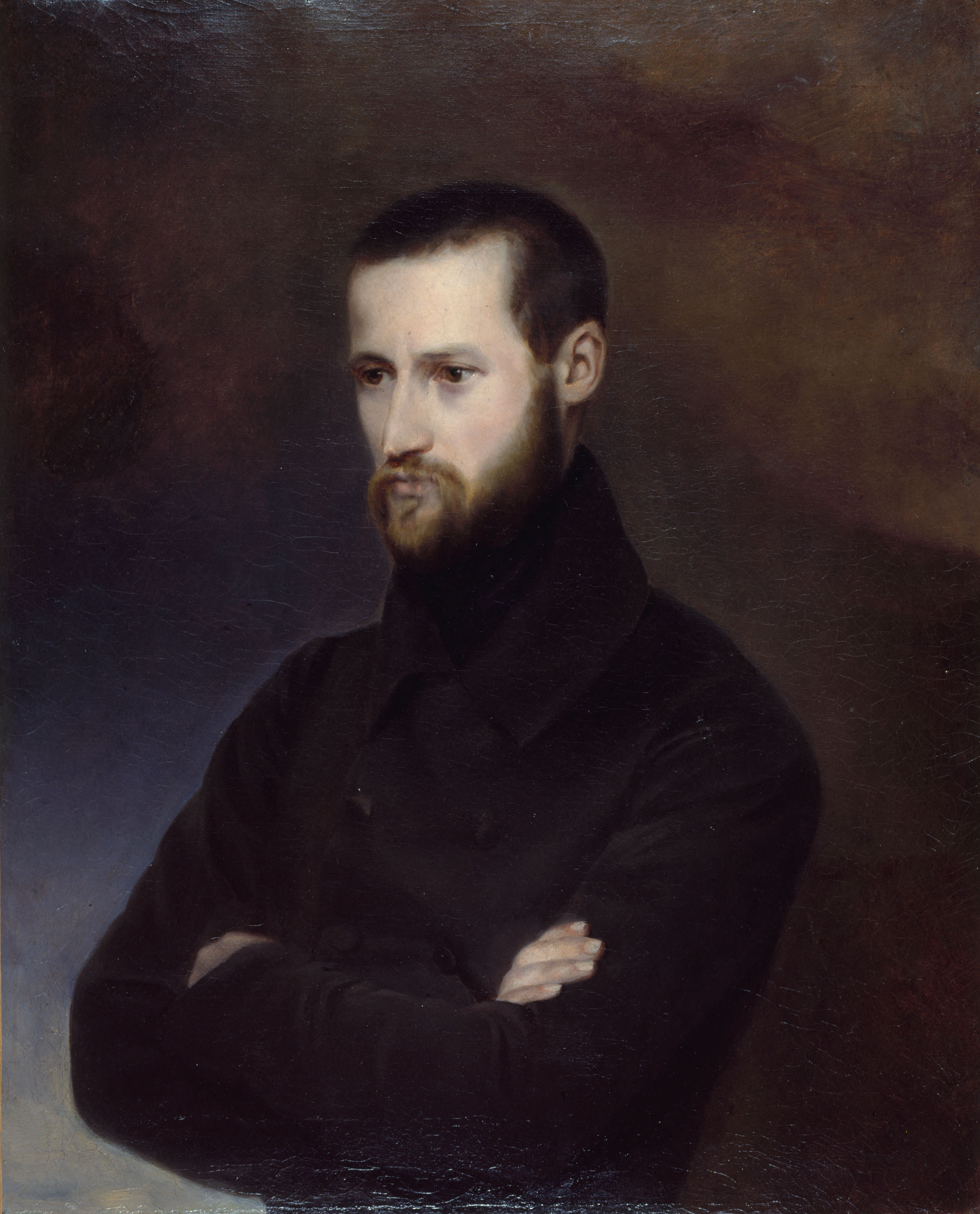
Portrait by Blanqui's wife Amélie-Suzanne Serre, c. 1835

This path led to repeated imprisonment. After being jailed in 1832–33, he founded the Société des Familles in 1834; he was jailed again in 1836–37, and upon his release patiently organised the secret Société des Saisons (Society of the Seasons). On 12 May 1839, he led the society in an ill-fated insurrectionary attempt in Paris. The rising was crushed after two days of street fighting. Although Blanqui initially evaded capture, he was arrested in January 1840 and sentenced to death, which was later commuted to life in prison. He spent the next several years in the brutal conditions of Mont-Saint-Michel prison, where his health severely deteriorated. In 1841, he learned that his wife, Amélie-Suzanne Serre, had died; the news devastated him, and he wore a black glove in devotion to her memory for much of the rest of his life.

=== 1848 Revolution and the Second Republic ===
Blanqui was released on medical grounds shortly before the outbreak of the French Revolution of 1848. He returned to Paris and quickly became a leading figure in the radical movement, founding the Société républicaine centrale (Central Republican Society). Through this political club, he pushed the Provisional Government to adopt more revolutionary measures through mass mobilisation, demanding that the red flag replace the tricolor and calling for the indefinite postponement of elections.

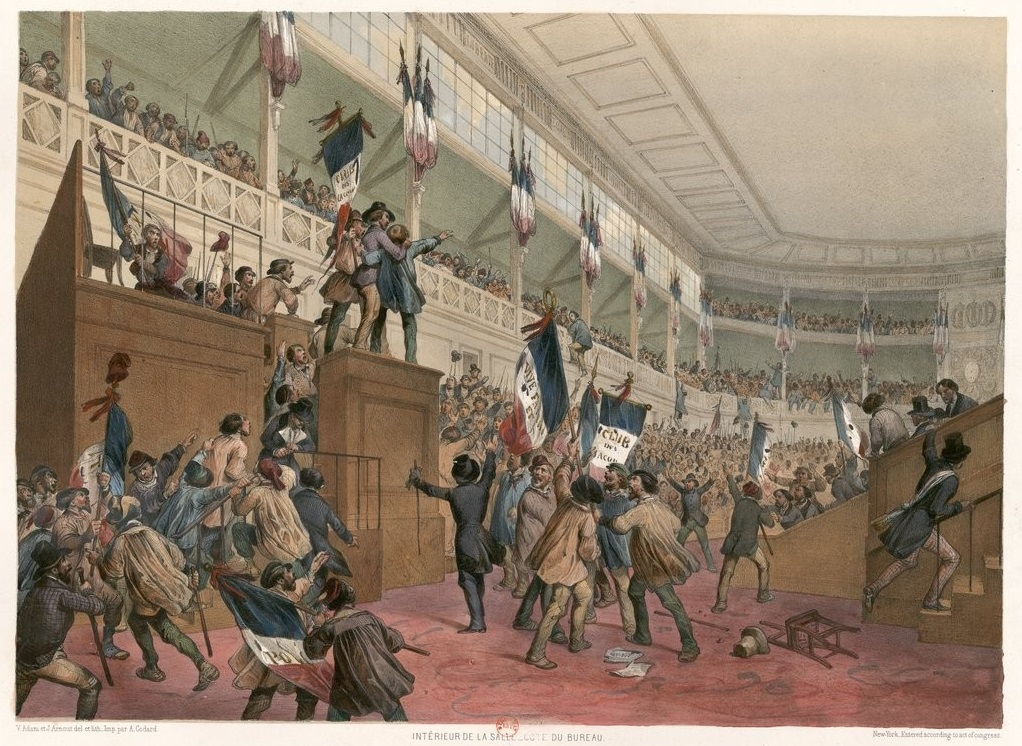
Depiction of the demonstration of 15 May 1848 in Paris

His influence made him a target for the new government. In April 1848, he was discredited by the circulation of the "Taschereau Document," a controversial text which implied he had betrayed his comrades after the 1839 uprising; the document caused a permanent split between Blanqui and some of his former allies, most notably Armand Barbès. On 15 May, under pressure from his supporters, he reluctantly led a demonstration that marched on the National Assembly. The event ended in failure, and Blanqui was arrested once again. He remained in prison during the brutal suppression of the Parisian workers in the June Days uprising and would not be released for another ten years.

=== Second Empire and final struggles ===
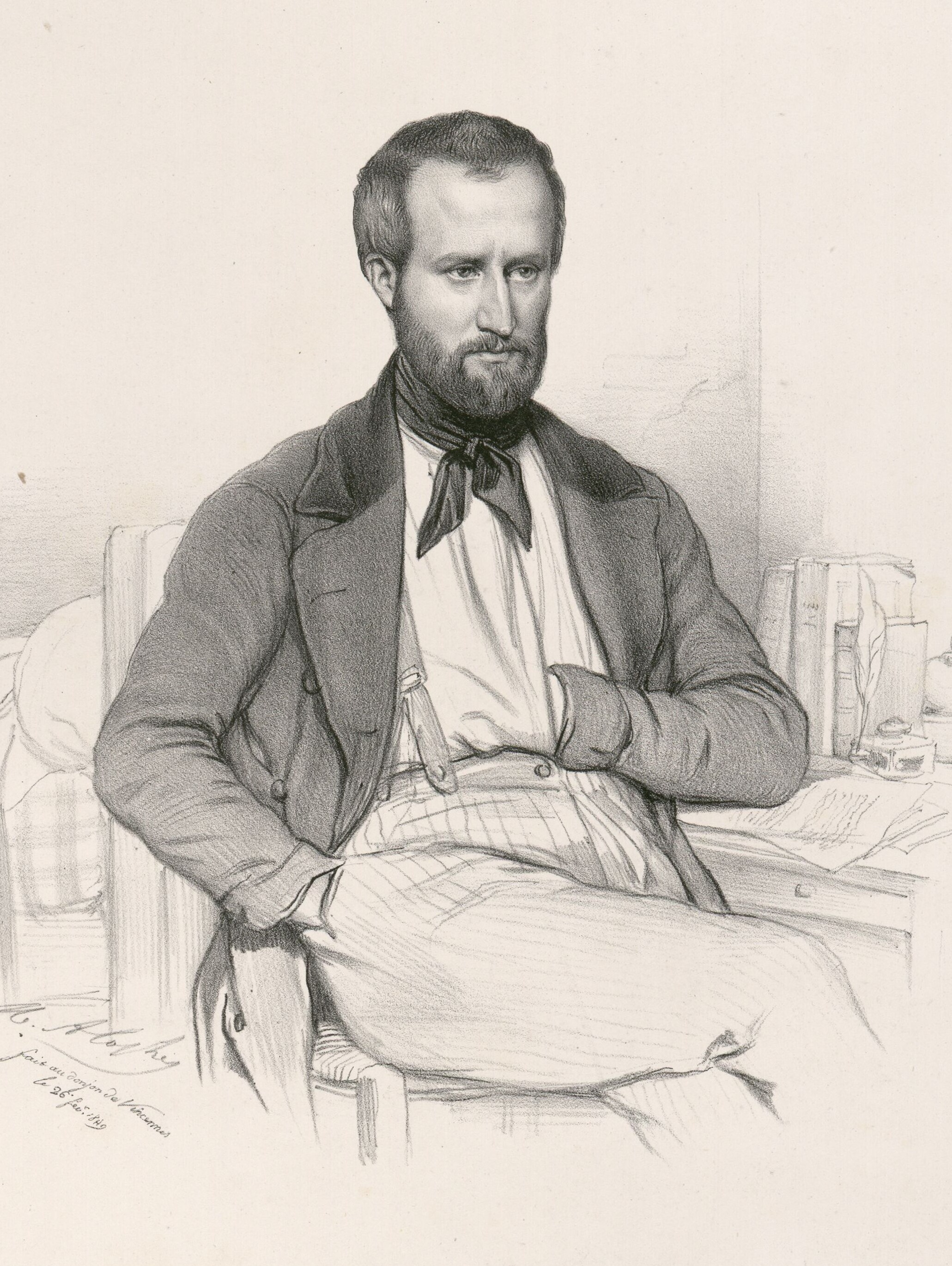
Depiction of Blanqui in his cell, 1849

Blanqui spent most of the 1850s in various prisons from Doullens and Belle-Île to Corsica and French Algeria, while Napoleon III consolidated his power. It was during this period that his reputation as a sinister but powerful conspirator grew, and he acquired the nickname L'Enfermé (The Prisoner). From prison, Blanqui wrote several influential texts, including his "Warning to the People" (1851) and "Letter to Maillard" (1852). These writings, widely circulated among French exiles, fiercely criticised the republican leaders of 1848, such as Louis Blanc and Alexandre Ledru-Rollin, for having betrayed the revolution. Blanqui argued that socialism was the true heir to the Jacobin tradition and that the neo-Jacobins of 1848 were mere "Girondins" in disguise.

Released following a general amnesty in August 1859, Blanqui prioritised clandestine propaganda over direct conspiratorial action but was quickly imprisoned again in 1861. At Sainte-Pélagie prison in Paris, he became a mentor to a new generation of young radicals, including Gustave Tridon, Émile Eudes, Raoul Rigault, and future prime minister Georges Clemenceau, who would form the core of the Blanquist party in the late 1860s. In August 1865, his followers helped him escape from a prison hospital, and he fled to Brussels. His exile lasted until a general amnesty in 1869, during which time he wrote some of his most important theoretical works, including his Instructions for an Armed Uprising.

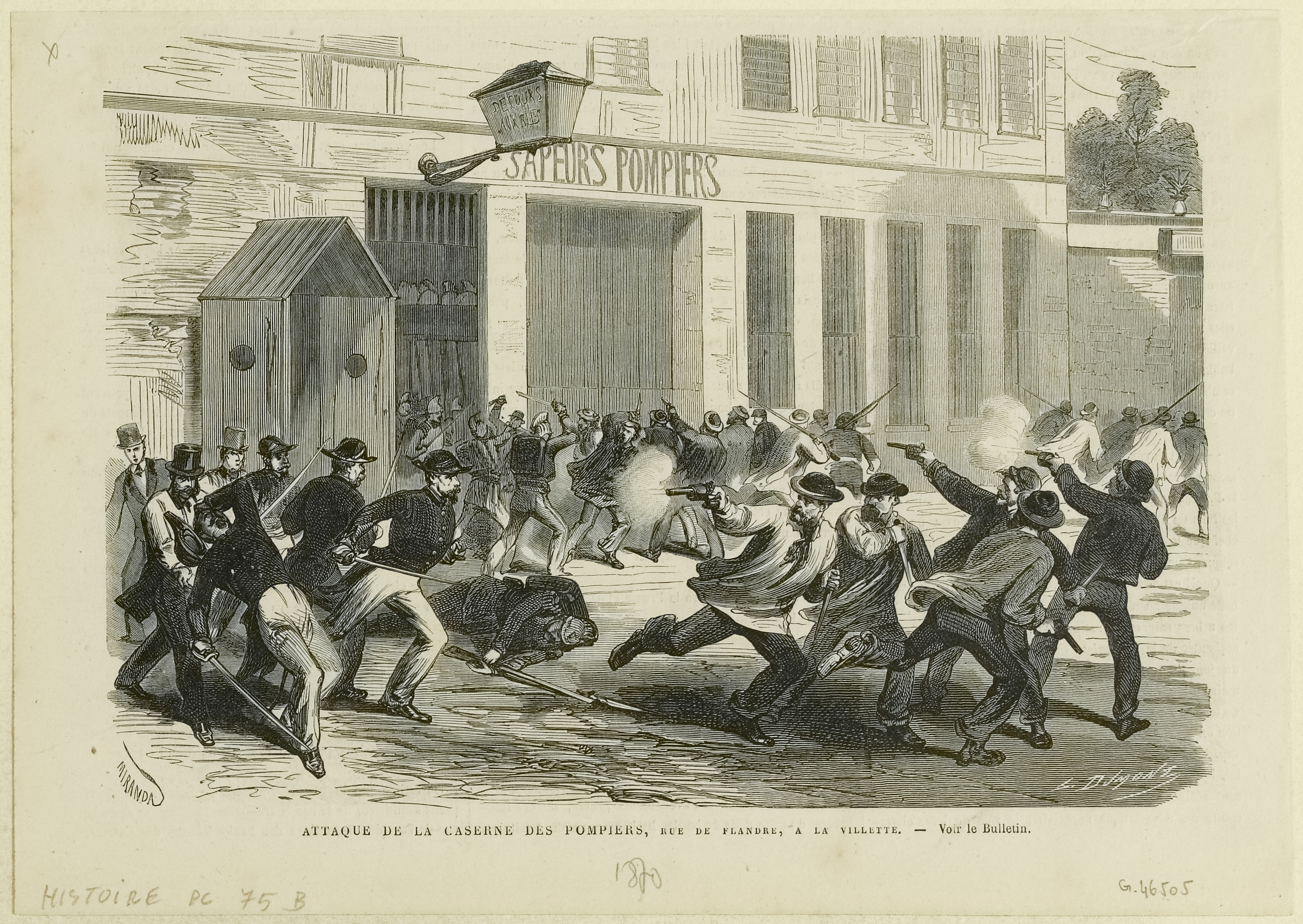
Depiction of the insurrection in La Villette on 14 August 1870, led by Blanqui

The Franco-Prussian War in 1870 brought Blanqui back to direct political agitation. On 14 August, he led another abortive insurrection in the La Villette district of Paris, which failed because it lacked popular support. After the fall of Napoleon III on 4 September, Blanqui founded the newspaper and club La Patrie en Danger (The Fatherland in Danger), attacking the new Government of National Defense for its ineffectual war effort. He played a prominent role in the popular uprising of 31 October.

On 17 March 1871, on the eve of the establishment of the Paris Commune, Blanqui was arrested for his role in the October uprising. He remained imprisoned in the Château du Taureau in Brittany for the duration of the Commune, oblivious to the events in Paris and the subsequent massacre of the Communards. The Commune repeatedly offered to exchange all of its hostages, including the Archbishop of Paris, for Blanqui alone, but the Versailles government under Adolphe Thiers refused, aware that releasing him would give the Commune its leader. It was during this imprisonment that he wrote his cosmological meditation, Eternity by the Stars (1872).

=== Final years and death ===
After another nine years in prison, an amnesty campaign centred on his name secured Blanqui's release in June 1879. His supporters had managed to get him elected to the Chamber of Deputies from Bordeaux in April, but his election was invalidated. Despite his age and poor health, he immediately resumed his political activities. He co-founded the journal Ni Dieu Ni Maître (Neither God Nor Master) and toured France, speaking out against a standing army and in favour of a general pardon for the surviving Communards.

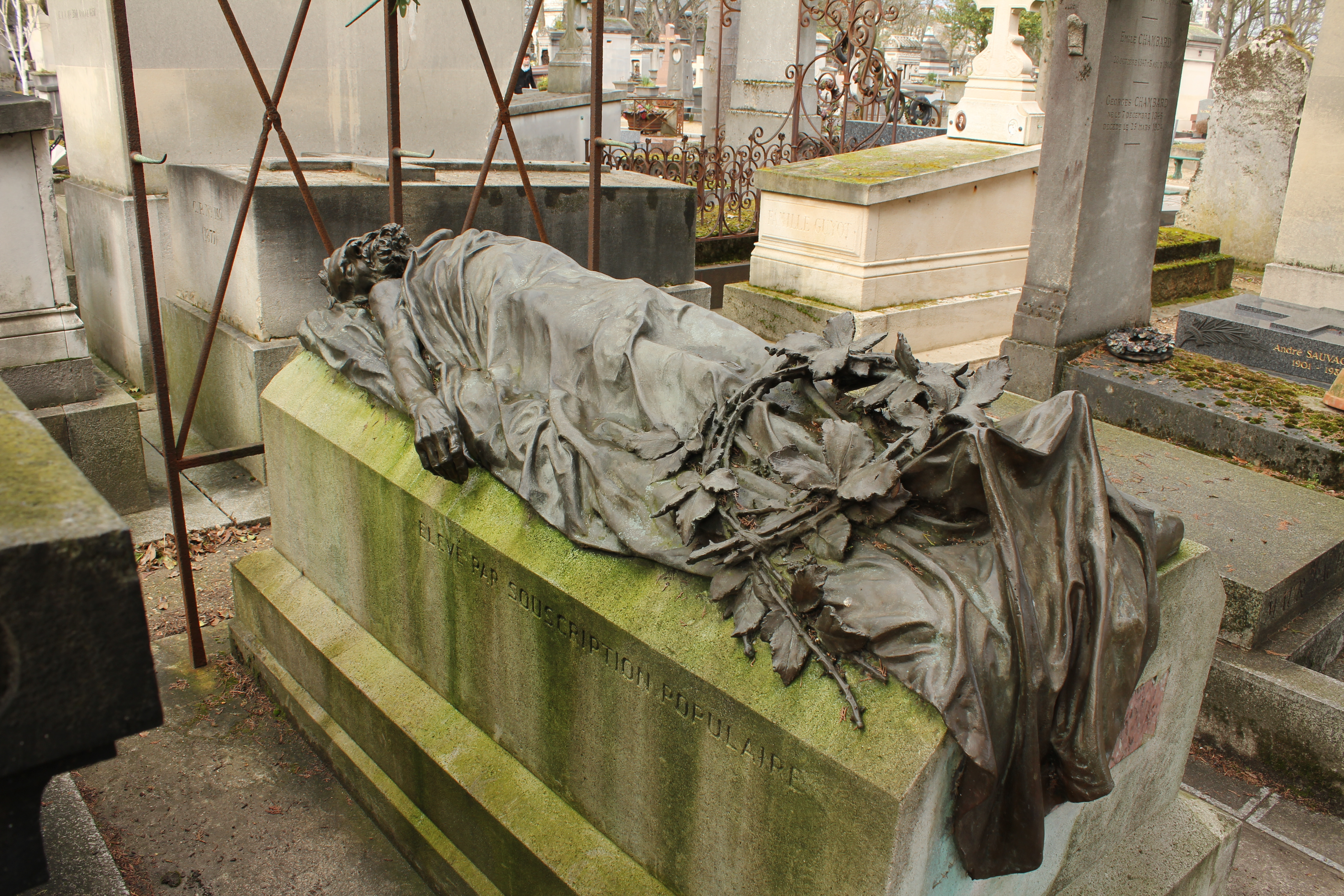
Blanqui's grave in the Père Lachaise Cemetery in Paris

On 1 January 1881, Blanqui died of a stroke in Paris. His funeral procession to the Père Lachaise Cemetery drew a crowd estimated between one hundred thousand and two hundred thousand people.

== Political thought ==
Blanqui's political theory is founded on the principle of popular empowerment through conscious and organised collective action. His work is best understood as an attempt to revitalise the militant, egalitarian legacy of the French Revolution for the 19th century. His followers, the Blanquists, saw themselves as neo-Hébertists, heirs to the most radical faction of the 1793 revolution.

=== Voluntarism and the primacy of politics ===
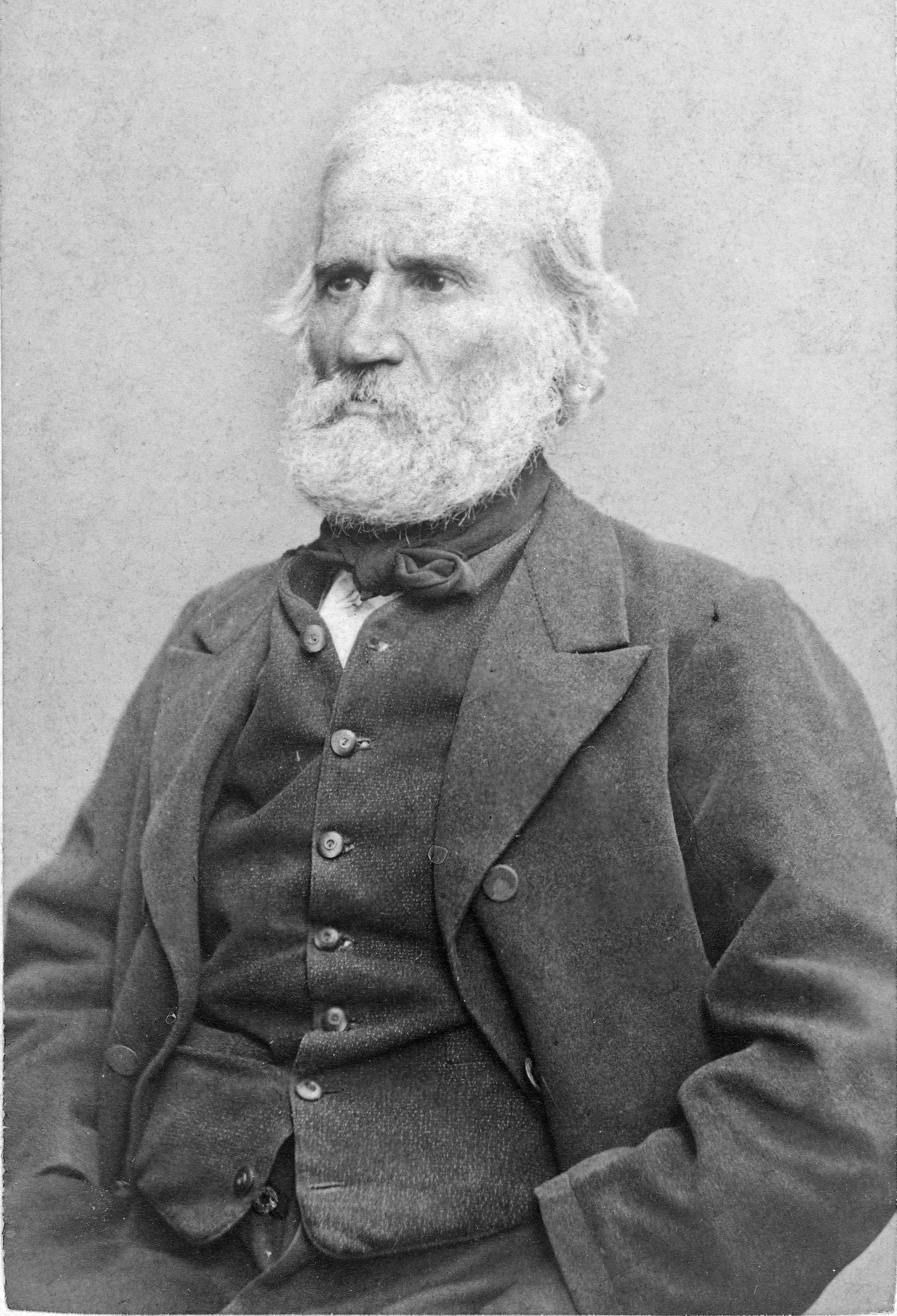
Blanqui in his later years

Blanqui's thought is defined by a fundamental dualism that separates the domain of nature, governed by immutable laws, from the domain of human affairs, which is contingent and shaped by will. He wrote, "The works of nature are fated or fatal... The works of human thought are changeable like thought itself, and depend on will, on energy or on weakness." He therefore rejected all forms of historical determinism, whether economic, religious, or positivist. For Blanqui, society's structure is not determined by objective forces but by political choices and actions. This principle, often described as political voluntarism, posits that a politically conscious and organised people can overcome any material or structural disadvantages to achieve their goals. As he declared in 1832, "we can do it, if we will it!" He viewed the forces dominating society as, in descending order of power, "Ideas, Capital, and Arms."

=== Role of intelligence and education ===
At the core of Blanqui's project is the primacy of intelligence and education. He believed that "mankind is thought; without thought mankind is nothing." He argued that social and political structures are reflections of a society's dominant philosophy and that poverty's primary cause is ignorance. Oppression, in all its forms, is rooted in ignorance, which is deliberately maintained by the ruling classes through institutions like the church and a controlled press. His atheism was therefore not an abstract philosophical position but a political weapon against what he saw as the ideological foundation of the old order. He distinguished between éducation (which he associated with clerical indoctrination that creates "slaves") and instruction (rational, scientific learning that creates "free men").

Consequently, he saw popular enlightenment as the essential precondition for revolutionary change and the establishment of a communist society. "Revolutions must take place in the mind," he wrote, "before they can be carried out in the streets." This belief created a central tension in his thought: if the masses are kept in a state of ignorance, how can they initiate their own emancipation? This dilemma led him to advocate for the necessity of an enlightened vanguard to lead the revolutionary process.

=== Class conflict and revolutionary strategy ===
Blanqui viewed society as fundamentally divided by an irreconcilable conflict, a "war to the death between the classes that compose the nation." This conflict was between the privileged few (the bourgeoisie, the rich) who owned the instruments of labour and lived off the work of others, and the oppressed majority (the proletariat, the people) who were dispossessed and exploited. In an 1852 letter, he estimated this division in France as approximately four million bourgeoisie and thirty-two million proletarians. He rejected any notion of a juste milieu (middle way) or class cooperation, insisting that in this struggle, one must choose a side. Neutrality and opportunism were the greatest political failings.

His strategy for resolving this conflict was a revolutionary seizure of state power. He argued for the necessity of a disciplined, organised minority of revolutionaries to act as a vanguard. This vanguard, concentrated in Paris—which he saw as the intellectual and political heart of France—would lead an insurrection to overthrow the existing government. Following the seizure of power, Blanqui proposed a temporary "Parisian dictatorship." This transitional government would have two main tasks: to suppress the counter-revolution and to initiate a nationwide programme of mass public education. Only once the populace was fully enlightened and capable of self-government would the dictatorship dissolve and give way to a fully democratic and communist society.

=== Views on history and progress ===
Consistent with his voluntarism, Blanqui rejected the idea of progress as an inevitable historical law. He was a fierce critic of positivist philosophies, like that of Auguste Comte, which he believed rationalised and condoned past and present suffering as necessary stages in a predetermined historical evolution. His view of history was shaped by Enlightenment neoclassicism, venerating classical antiquity and scorning the Middle Ages as a "reign of terror, barbarism, and force" imposed by Christianity. For Blanqui, history is not a linear march forward; it is open to both progress and regression. Progress is not something that happens automatically but is the result of conscious political struggle against injustice.

His most enigmatic work, Eternity by the Stars (1872), is often misinterpreted as a statement of political resignation. In it, Blanqui hypothesises an infinite universe containing a finite number of elemental combinations, leading to the eternal repetition of identical worlds and histories. However, he maintains his core dualism between natural necessity and human freedom. While the material universe is subject to repetition, on each Earth human volition and choice create unique and contingent histories. The text is not an abandonment of politics but a radical affirmation of human agency within the confines of our own world, asserting that "it does disrupt humanity."

== Legacy ==
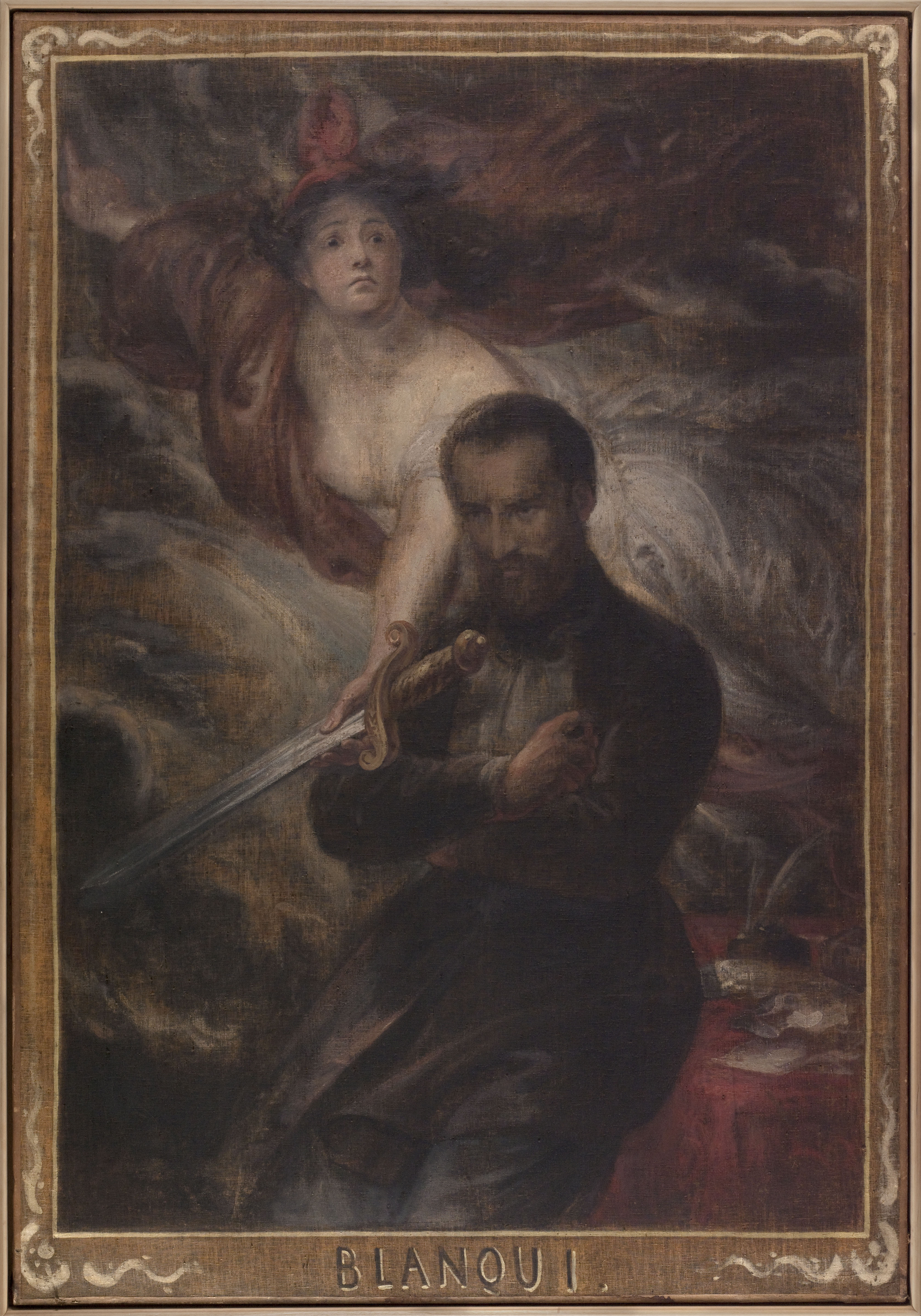
Portrait by Antoine Wiertz, c. 1848–1865

During his lifetime, Blanqui was a deeply polarising figure, a symbol of hope for revolutionaries and of fear for the established order. Karl Marx, in his account of the 1848 revolutions, identified "revolutionary socialism" with "Communism, for which the bourgeoisie has itself invented the name of Blanqui." For Marx at the time, Blanqui was "the noble martyr of revolutionary communism," the true leader of the French proletariat. In contrast, more moderate observers were often repulsed by him. Alexis de Tocqueville described him as having a "sickly, malign, dirty look like a pallid, mouldy corpse," while Heinrich Heine saw him as "terrorism incarnate." This image of Blanqui as a monstrous and dreaded adversary of society persisted.

After his death, the critique formulated by Friedrich Engels became the dominant interpretation within Marxist circles. Engels portrayed Blanqui as a pre-Marxist idealist, a "man of action" from a bygone era whose revolutionary model relied on a small, conscious minority imposing its will on an unconscious mass. This critique solidified the term "Blanquism" as a pejorative for conspiratorial adventurism, anti-democratic elitism, and voluntarist putschism. Socialists from the Second International onward largely disavowed him, and Vladimir Lenin himself was careful to state, "We are not Blanquists." As a result, Blanqui became what his biographer Maurice Dommanget called "the Forgotten one of socialism." The German theorist Eduard Bernstein, while dismissing Blanquist ideology as obsolete, praised Blanqui's followers for their "elemental combativeness" and capacity for "creativity" in seeking to stimulate revolutionary awareness.

In the 20th century, figures like Walter Benjamin rediscovered Blanqui, though often through a lens of heroic melancholy and political failure. More recent scholarship has sought to re-evaluate Blanqui as a serious political thinker, moving beyond the caricature of the failed conspirator to analyse his contributions to theories of political will, organisation, and popular empowerment.

== Works ==
=== French ===
- L'Armée esclave et opprimée
- Critique sociale: Capital et travail
- Critique sociale: Fragments et notes
- L'Éternité par les astres
- Instructions pour une prise d'armes.
- Maintenant il faut des armes
- Ni dieu ni maitre
- Qui fait la soupe doit la manger
- Réponse
- Un dernier mot

=== English translations ===
- The Eternity According to the Stars, tr. by Mathew H. Anderson, with an afterword by Lisa Block de Behar ("Literary Escapes and Astral Shelters of an Incarcerated Conspirator"). In CR: The New Centennial Review 9/3: 61–94, Winter 2009. The first full-length translation into English.
- Eternity by the Stars. Frank Chouraqui, trans. New York: Contra Mundum Press, 2013.

== See also ==
- Dictatorship of the proletariat
