= Adélaïde Valentin =

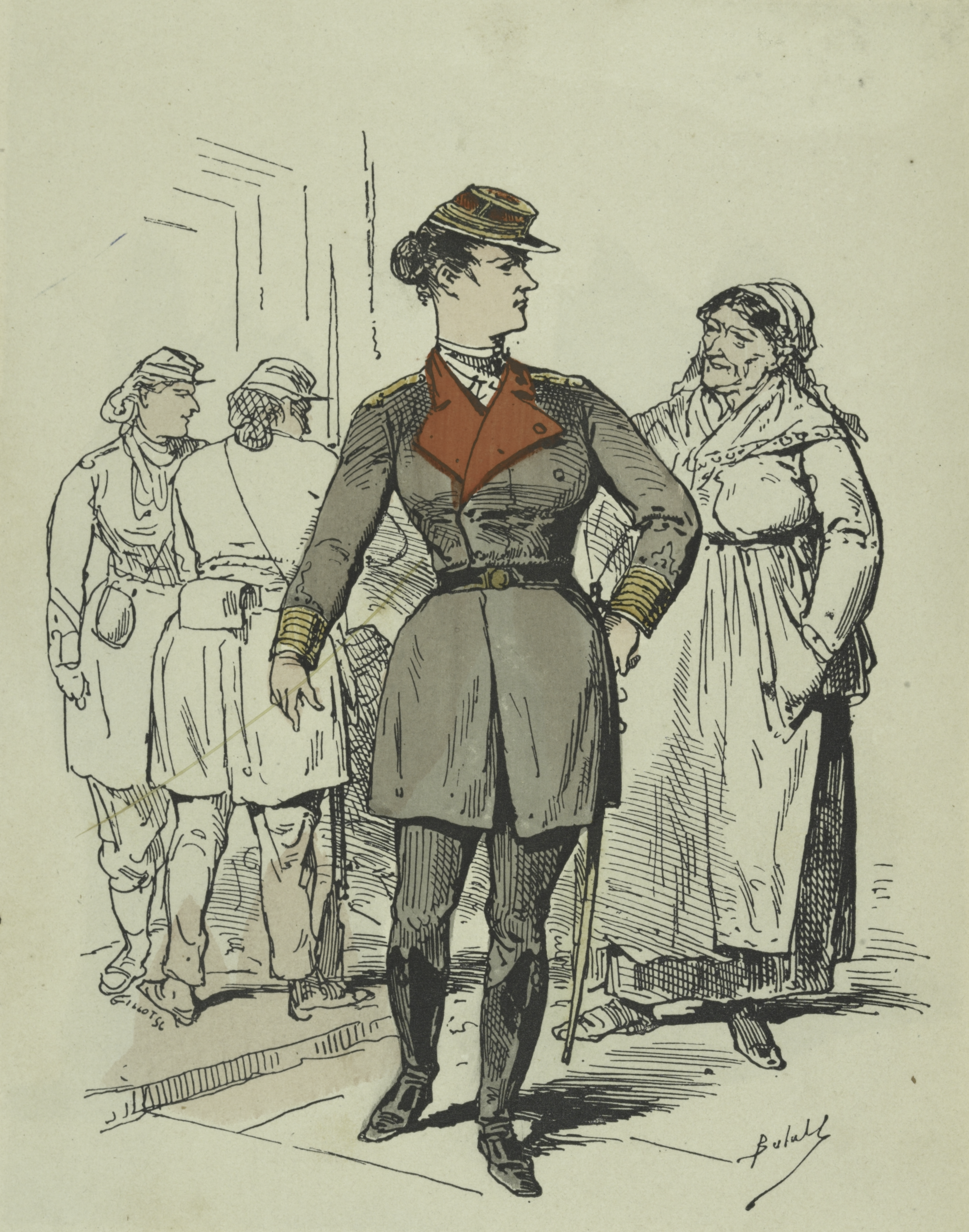
La Colonelle by Bertall in Les Communeux, types, caractères, costumes, 1871.

Adélaïde Valentin, also known as Colonel Valentin, was a labourer and communard. She was, during the last month of the Paris Commune, the colonel of the Federated Legion of Women.

Adélaïde Valentin participated in the founding of the Union des femmes pour la défense de Paris et les soins aux blessés in April 1871 and became a delegate to the Central Provisional Committee. Present in political clubs, in particular the one at Saint-Éloi in the 12th arrondissement, from 10 May she directed the Federated Legion of Women, a women's military organization charged with finding deserters.

Few traces of her life have been preserved, with the exception of records of her virulent speeches in the clubs, where she exhorted women to participate in the defence of the Commune. These were remarked upon by her contemporaries, in particular, the anti-communard observer Paul Fontoulieu. Details of her life after the Commune are unknown.

== Biography ==
Very few details of her life are known, in particular nothing outside of her actions during the Paris Commune. At that time, she was a labourer living in the Cour des Petites-Écuries, in the 10th arrondissement of Paris.

=== Communard in the 12th arrondissement ===
The beginning of the Franco-Prussian War in the summer of 1870 saw the fall of Napoleon III and the Second Empire, and then the proclamation of the Third Republic on 4 September 1870. On 18 March 1871, in reaction to the capitulation of France in the Armistice of Versailles and the new National Assembly with its monarchist majority, the population of Paris and the National Guard revolted. The Paris Commune was proclaimed on 28 March. Political life was organized around the elected Commune Council and meetings in political clubs, which had already been present before the uprising, and which brought together citizens with similar political opinions in the same neighbourhood.

The first known mentions of Adélaïde Valentin date to April 1871. She was an active communard who frequented several clubs. Her participation is attested at three of them: the Club du Comité de vigilance of the 4th arrondissement at the church of Saint-Paul; the Club des Prolétaires at Saint-Ambroise in the 11th arrondissement; and the Club Éloi, at the church of Saint-Éloi in the 12th arrondissement. In the latter, the participation of women was particularly important; Council members, local politicians, and officers of the National Guard also attended there, and it became the centre of revolutionary action in the 12th arrondissement.

Before the Legion of Women was formed, a "Committee of Republican Women" (French: Comité de Républicaines) had already been created in the arrondissement, supported by the mayor, Jean Fenouillas (known as "Philippe"), in order to reorganize public assistance. Adélaïde Valentin was probably a member of this committee: after the fall of the Commune, another member, Julie Magot, testified before the court martial that Valentin had been involved with the expulsion of nuns from a local charitable institution. This kind of action was among the aims of the Committee of Republican Women. Additionally, she may have been Phillipe's mistress.

=== Delegate of the Union des femmes ===
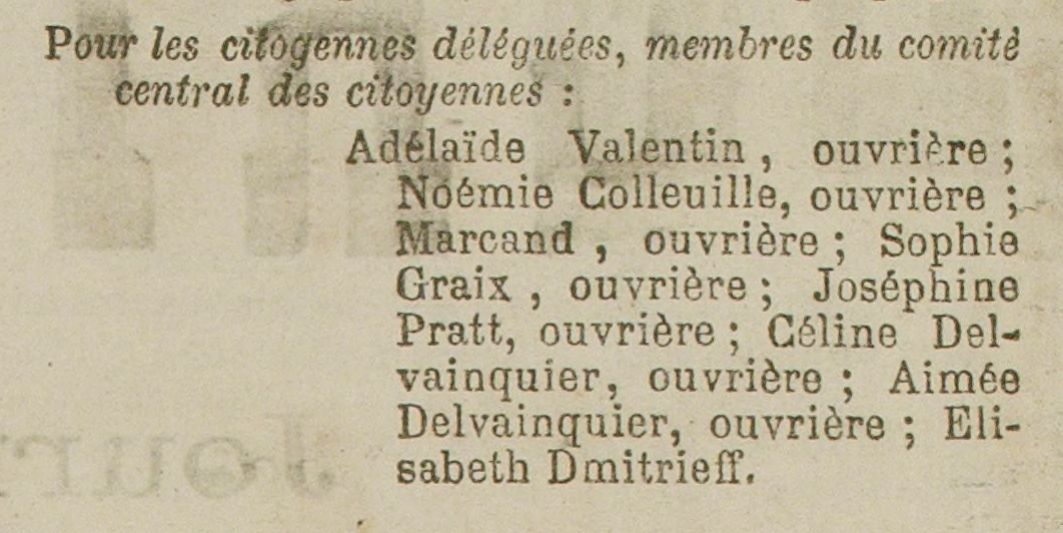
Signatories of the "Address of the women citizens to the executive commission of the Paris Commune", published in the Journal officiel.

Adélaïde Valentin participated in the foundation of the feminist organization, the Union des femmes pour la défense de Paris et les soins aux blessés, directed by the Russian revolutionary Elisabeth Dmitrieff. This organization, the most important of the various groups independent of the Commune government, was constituted of committees in each arrondissement, which were joined into a Central Committee. Valentin was one of the seven delegates, all labourers, to the Central Provisional Committee on the foundation on 11 April 1871. Martin Philip Johnson has hypothesized that the Committee of Republican Women was a local branch of the Union des femmes.

On 14 April, she was the first of eight signatories — the seven delegates and Dmitrieff — of an address to the executive commission of the Commune published in Journal officiel and then in Le Cri du peuple. The Union des femmes demanded organizational assistance and declared its intentions: to restructure women's work and to take part actively in the defence of the city. On 17 April, with Blanche Lefebvre and the citizen known as "Girard", Valentin signed the notice for the third public meeting held on 21 April at Notre-Dame-de-la-Croix de Ménilmontant, where additional delegates for the arrondissement committees were designated. She was not a member of the new Central Committee that was set up after the fourth public meeting and composed of delegates of each of the arrondissement branches of the Union des femmes.

=== Colonel of the Federated Legion of Women ===
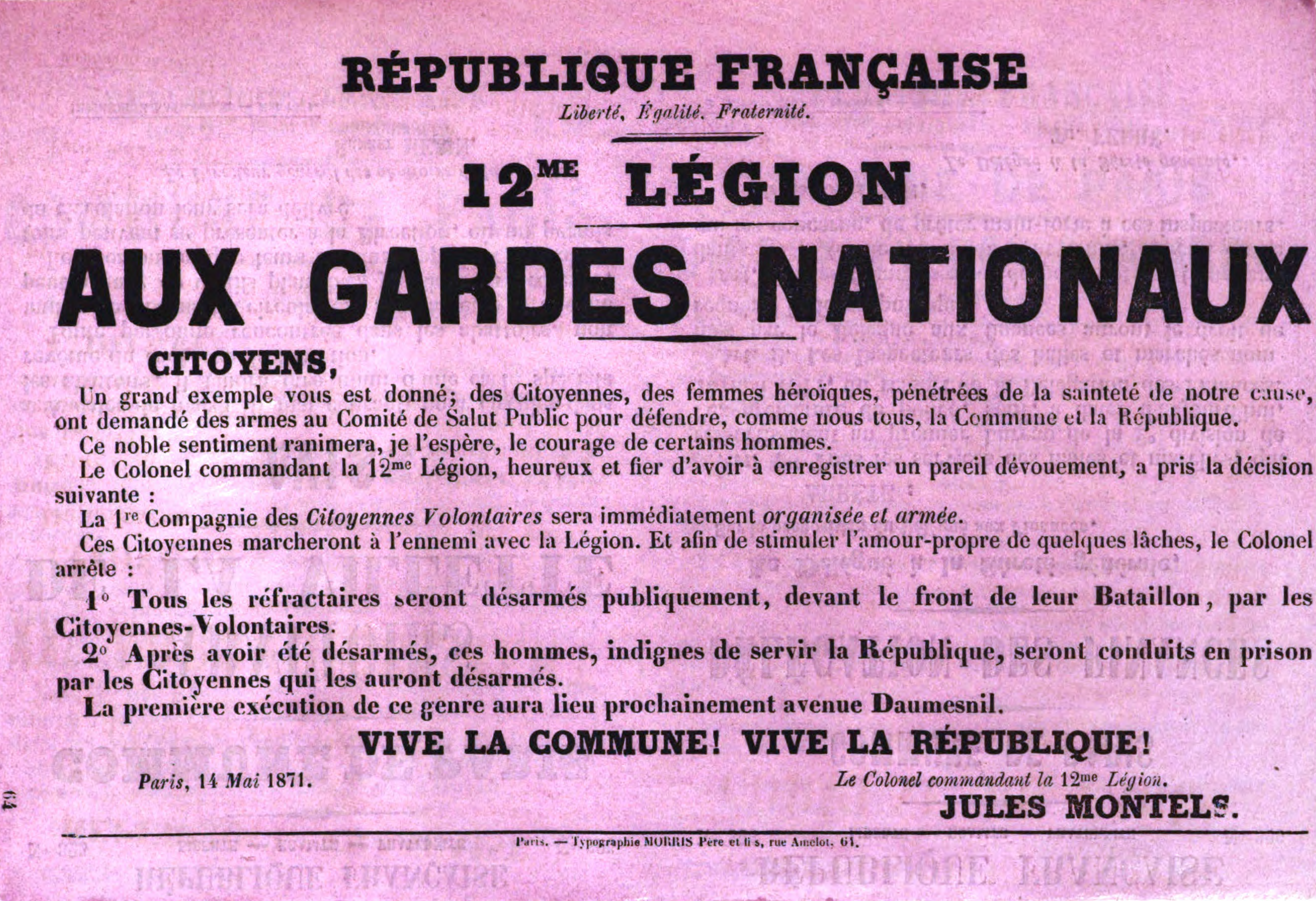
Proclamation of the "first company of volunteer women citizens" in the 12th arrondissement, signed by Jules Montels (Murailles politiques françaises, 1874).

In May 1871, Adélaïde Valentin became colonel of the Federated Legion of Women. This unit, exclusively made up of women, was founded on 10 May by Colonel Jules Montels, on the order of Philippe, the mayor of the 12th arrondissement. The Legion was charged with organizing the search for deserters of the National Guard, an activity that was already being practiced by women before the creation of the Legion. The unit was armed and organized militarily. Witness testimonies put the number of members between 20 and 100. The Legion welcomed the participation of the women of Club Éloi. Valentin was chosen to direct the Legion, alongside Captain Louise Neckbecker (or Neibecker, née Keinerknecht, a 28-year-old trim-maker and ambulance nurse), and the standard-bearer, Marie Rogissart.

From 12 May onward, the women marched with the 12th Legion of the National Guard (the 12th arrondissement's unit), according to the account of a Council member, Benoît Malon. Their parades are attested by different witnesses: one testified during Louise Neckbecker's trial that she had been seen in May, "adorned with a red armband, receiving, from the hands of the woman Valentin in front of the town hall, a red flag that she carried to the Hôtel-de-ville, escorted by around 100 other women." Many men testified to having been arrested by the National Guard following denunciation by the women of the Legion. The women were confined to this role: they were not to arrest deserters directly and had to appeal to the men of the National Guard.

There are no direct records of Adélaïde Valentin's actions, but separate witnesses agree on her role. Several of her speeches in clubs during May are known, in which she urged women to join the armed ranks of the Commune, and which witnesses noted for their virulence. The women of the Legion were very obvious at Club Éloi, where they organized a total of nine meetings.

=== Semaine sanglante and disappearance ===
Adélaïde Valentin's last known speech was held at the Club des Prolétaires on 20 May, on the eve of the entry of Versailles forces to Paris, the event that marked the beginning of the Semaine sanglante and the end of the Commune. According to the minutes of the meeting, Valentin encouraged women to join the Federated Legion of Women: she appealed for women to "guard the gates of Paris while the men go to battle." She ended her speech by asking for clothing confiscated from nuns to be redistributed to poor children, and that "the flowers upon the altars, in the chapels, and all around the madonnas, be given to schoolchildren as prizes, to decorate the garrets of the poor." The proposition was unanimously accepted. A member of the club thanked her and invited her to return, an unusual occurrence that may reflect her status as colonel of the Legion.

After 20 May 1871, Adélaïde Valentin disappears from the historical record. Her actions during Semaine sanglante are unknown, as is her life after the Commune, if she even survived the repression.

== Representation ==
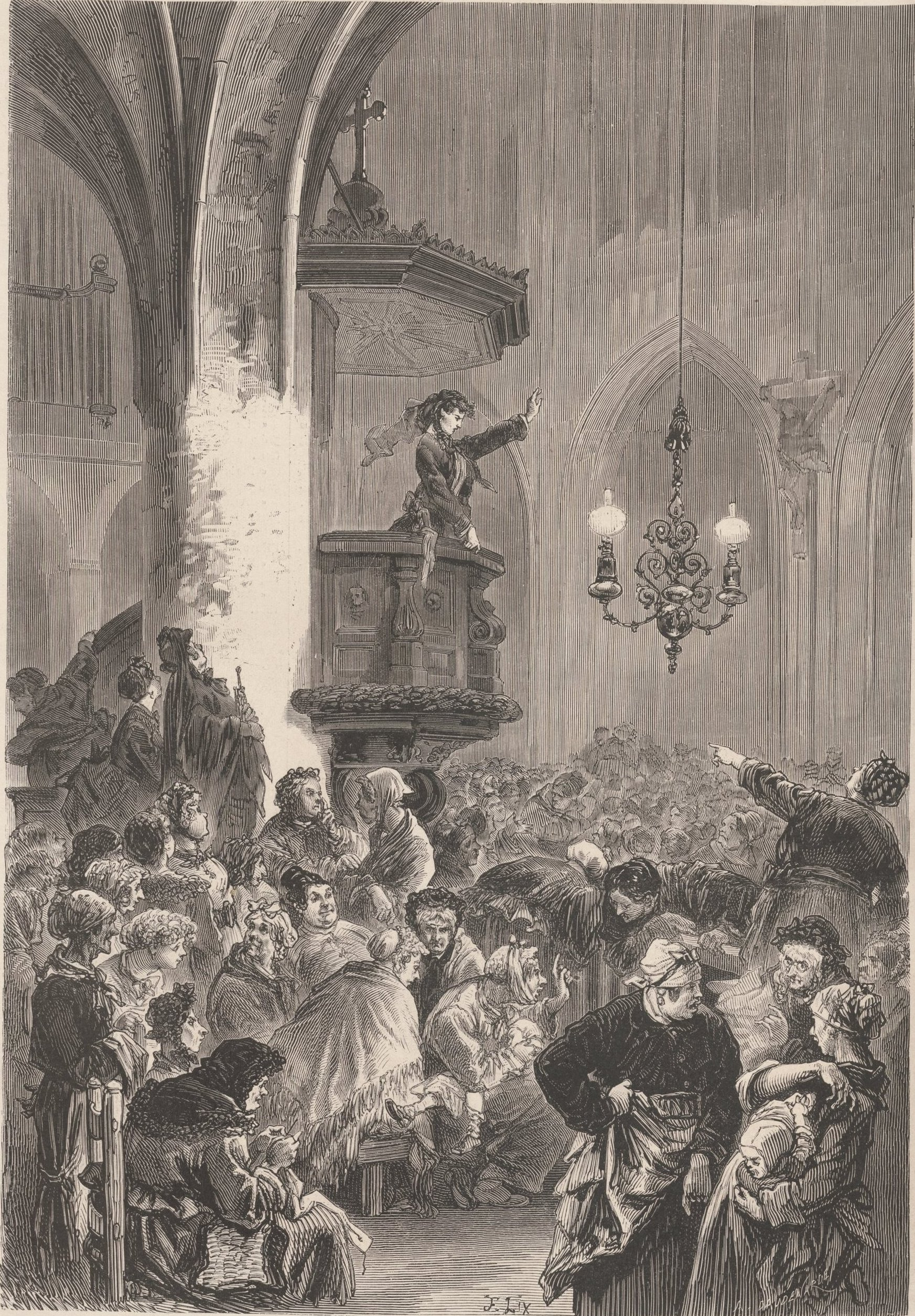
Une séance du Club des femmes dans l'église Saint-Germain-l'Auxerrois, engraving by Frédéric Lix for Le Monde illustré, 20 May 1871.

=== Hysterical portrait and reported speeches ===
The abbot Paul Fontoulieu described Valentin in his Les Églises de Paris sous la Commune as "short, fat, red-haired; a fanatic of the worst kind, who can be seen at the opening of all the clubs," and "a prostitute". Fontoulieu is a generally reliable observer, but an anti-communard one; he paints a hysterical portrait of Valentin by quoting her violent words, such as those at the 16 May session of Club Éloi: "I urge all women to denounce their husbands and make them take up arms. If they refuse, shoot them!" An eyewitness reported that an unspecified woman at Club Éloi had called on women to attack their husbands if they refused to join the army: "I saw [...] a woman climb into the pulpit with a revolver in her hand. She said she would blow her husband's brains out if he didn't want to march and that all women should do the same." Fontoulieu attributes similar remarks to Valentin.

After the fall of the Commune, Valentin's former comrade Julie Magot accused Valentin of being a very violent club member and of having threatened her husband, who was an official at the town hall. Fontoulieu also reports that "she was always armed" with a sabre, and that she brandished it at the meeting of the Club des Prolétaires on 18 May, when she declared: "Citizens, the scoundrel priests are in our quarter again. It is shameful. When we leave here, we must slit their throats and chop them up like pig meat." Valentin was not the only woman to brandish her weapon at the podium to intimidate or reinforce her words; Julie Magot was also accused of doing so, and Louise Michel testified to it in 1898 in her Souvenirs.

Martin Philip Johnson contrasts these remarks with her speech of 20 May, which is not reported by Fontoulieu but comes to us through the minutes of the Club des Prolétaires, wherein she requested that the flowers in front of the statue of Mary be given to poor schoolchildren.

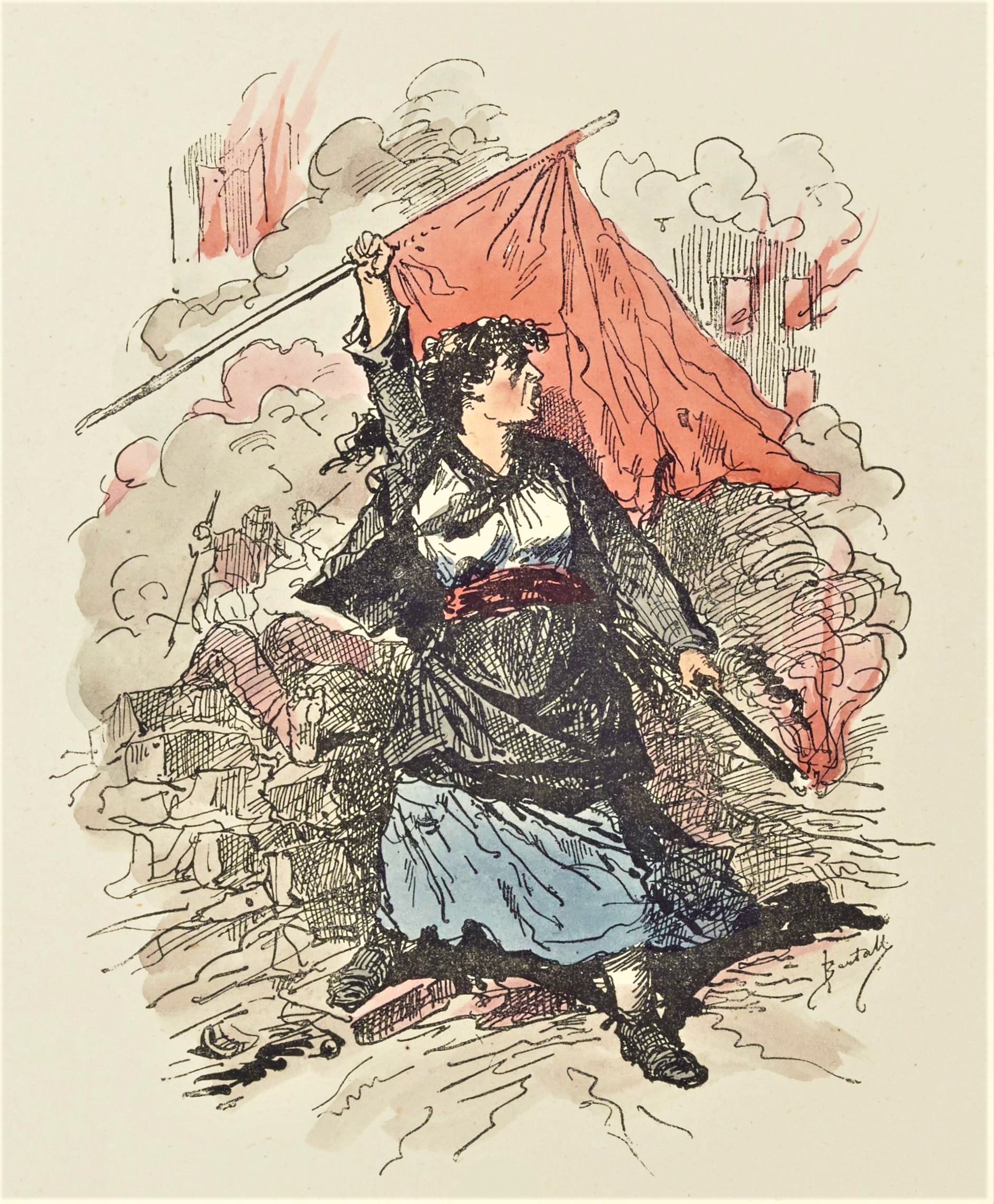
La Barricade by Bertall, 1871.

=== Illustration by Bertall ===
The illustrator, Bertall, published an anti-Communard portrait series Les Communeux: Types, caractères, costumes in 1871, which contains an illustration entitled La Colonelle. The biographical dictionary Le Maitron compares the image to "Colonel Valentin". She is dressed in the uniform of an officer, with epaulettes and kepi, hair rolled up, armed with a sabre, and with scandalously tight trousers. The text accompanying the illustration describes her as "unsexed and low ... in her assumption of Manhood." Other similarly "unsexed" women include the banner-wielding woman of La Barricade. Gay L. Gullickson emphasizes that, while the Communard woman in this illustration has a clearly feminine figure, she has a shaggy and rough, even unsightly appearance, like the caricature of the "pétroleuses," and she is isolated. A similar masculine posture can be seen in Club à l'église, which shows a woman in the pulpit in front of a crowd of working-class people bearing weapons. These framings illustrate the anti-communard point of view, about the social chaos that they supposed the Commune to be, in particular the base morals they attributed to revolutionary women. Conversely, Bertall depicted Communard men as feminine and weak.
