= Federated Legion of Women =

- Légion des Fédérées
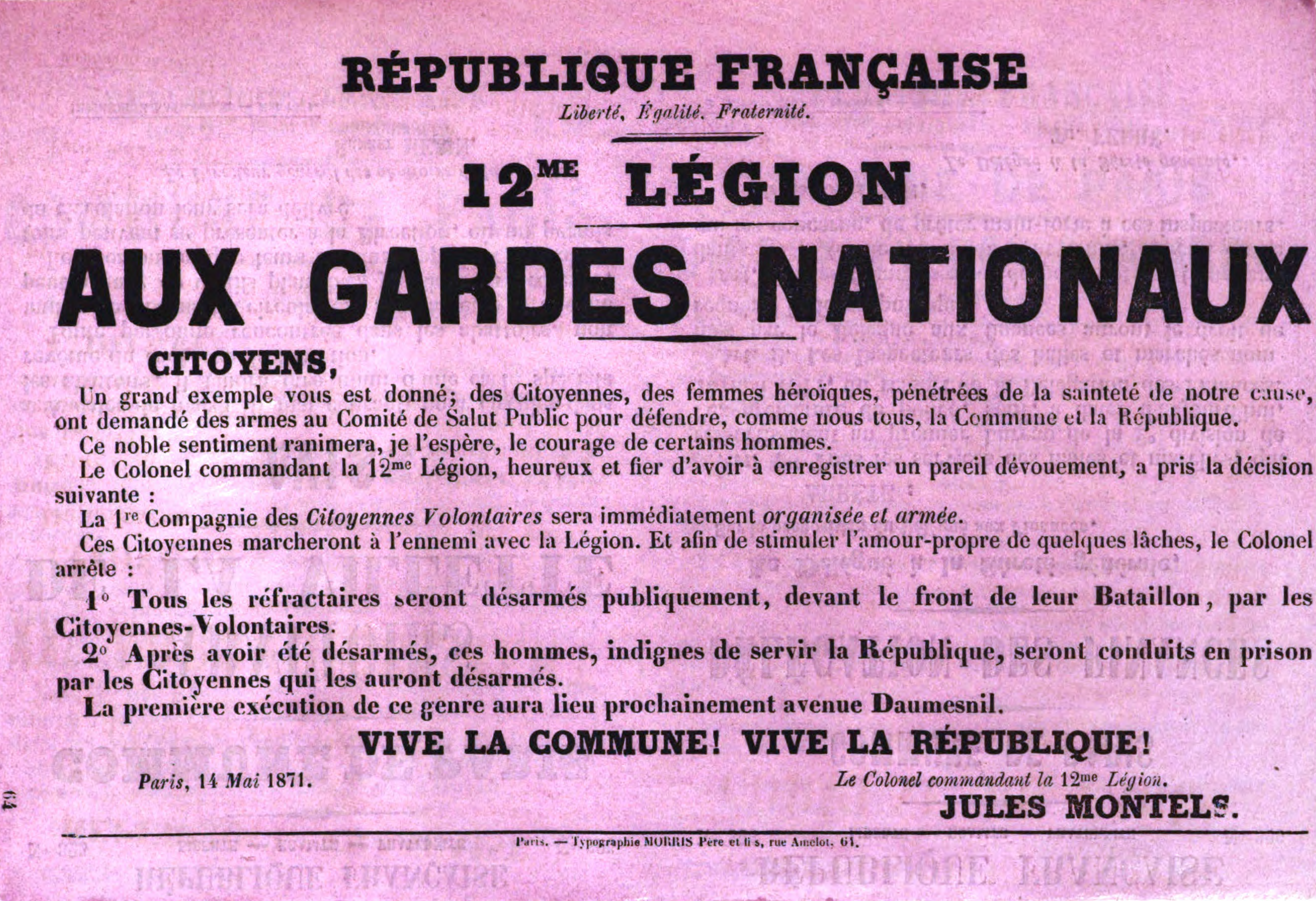
- Proclamation of the "first company of volunteer citizen women", signed by Jules Montels (Murailles politiques françaises, 1874).
- Active: 10–28 May 1871
- Country: France
- Allegiance: Paris Commune
- Branch: National Guard
- Type: Battalion
- Size: 20-100
- Garrison/HQ: 12th arrondissement

Commanders
- Colonel: Adélaïde Valentin
- Captain: Louise Neckbecker

The Federated Legion of Women (French: légion des Fédérées) was an armed unit composed of women active during the Paris Commune in May 1871. It was founded in the 12th arrondissement, with the intended mission of hunting down deserters. The legion had uniforms, parades, and a standard-bearer, and was led by two officers, Colonel Adélaïde Valentin and Captain Louise Neckbecker. There were an estimated 20-100 members, most from working-class backgrounds. They held and attended meetings in Parisian political clubs, where they incited citizens to take up arms. After the defeat of the Commune, arrested members were given heavy sentences, including forced labour and deportation.

== Formation ==
French defeats early in the Franco-Prussian War led to the capture of Emperor Napoleon III and the collapse of the Second French Empire in September 1870. The Third French Republic was formed in response, led by the Government of National Defense, which intended to carry on fighting. Prussian troops quickly surrounded Paris, besieging the city from 19 September 1870. The government grew increasingly unpopular with Parisians as efforts to break the siege failed, citizens starved, and the bombardment of the city intensified. Revolutionary sentiment grew over the winter, particularly among the National Guard, which vastly outnumbered the professional soldiers of the French Army in the besieged city. France surrendered on 28 January 1871, and a new National Assembly, dominated by monarchists and led by the conservative Adolphe Thiers, was elected on 8 February. The National Guard refused to disarm or allow the army to take the cannons that had been used in the defence of Paris against the Germans, and on 18 March the Paris Commune was declared as an independent government. The Third Republic governed instead from Versailles, waiting for reinforcements to retake the city.

Women had been officially barred from the battlefield by the Commune's Committee of Public Safety on May 1, despite the insistence of militant writers like André Léo and Louise Michel that, in order for the Commune to succeed, women should be welcomed as soldiers. Fighting women, who were mostly working class, were indeed welcomed by the ordinary soldiers of the National Guard, who were as well; Léo attributed the opposition to their presence to the "bourgeois and authoritarian mindset" of the officers and surgeons. Fighting women presented an obvious challenge to the widespread assumption that only men could have the full rights of citizenship, since only men could bear arms. Indeed, many women of the Commune were praised as citoyennes ("citizens") in response to their militant and masculine behaviour. This crossing of gender boundaries was viewed with disgust, ridicule, and incomprehension by opponents of the Commune.

Women nevertheless persisted in forming political clubs and voluntary organizations for the armed defence of Paris against Versailles forces. Of these, the Union des femmes pour la défense de Paris et les soins aux blessés (Union of Women for the Defence of Paris and the Care of the Wounded) was the most important. It was initially created for explicitly military purposes, and expanded into organizing women's workshops and ambulance crews.

The 12th arrondissement was very involved in the communard movement. Its mayor, Philippe, who was also elected to the Commune Council, was especially implicated in the hunt for deserters of the National Guard. Alongside Auguste Audebrant, the police commissioner for the Quartier des Quinze-Vingts, and Jules Montels, colonel of the 12th Legion of the National Guard, Philippe was the head of a military commission that sat at the town hall, and of the "Committee of la rue d'Aligre". A major centre of revolutionary action in the 12th arrondissement was Club Éloi, where elected Commune officials, town hall functionaries, National Guard officers, and many women all took part in debates. At the end of April, a Committee of Republican Women was formed and recognized by the arrondissement authorities. Among the committee's members were Julie Magot and possibly Adélaïde Valentin, who was also a founding member of the Union des femmes.

On 10 May 1871, the day after he took up his post as colonel of the 12th Legion of the National Guard (that is, the Fédérés of the 12th arrondissement), Jules Montels announced the "first company of volunteer citizen women". It is likely that the group had already arisen from the local Union des femmes and the Committee of Republican Women, and that this announcement "was simply a recognition of official patronage." Furthermore, women had already been pursuing deserters independently, and continued to do so after the foundation of the legion. The announcement poster read: "To the National Guards of the 12th Legion. [...] You have been given a great example: the citizens, heroic women, filled with the righteousness of our cause, demanded arms from the Committee of Public Safety to defend, like all of us, the Commune and the Republic." Their function was specified: the women would disarm deserters "publicly, in front of their battalion", then "these men, unworthy of the republic, will be taken to prison by the citizens who disarmed them." The military virtue and courage of the women contrasted with the masculine failure of the deserters and draft-dodgers.

== Organisation ==
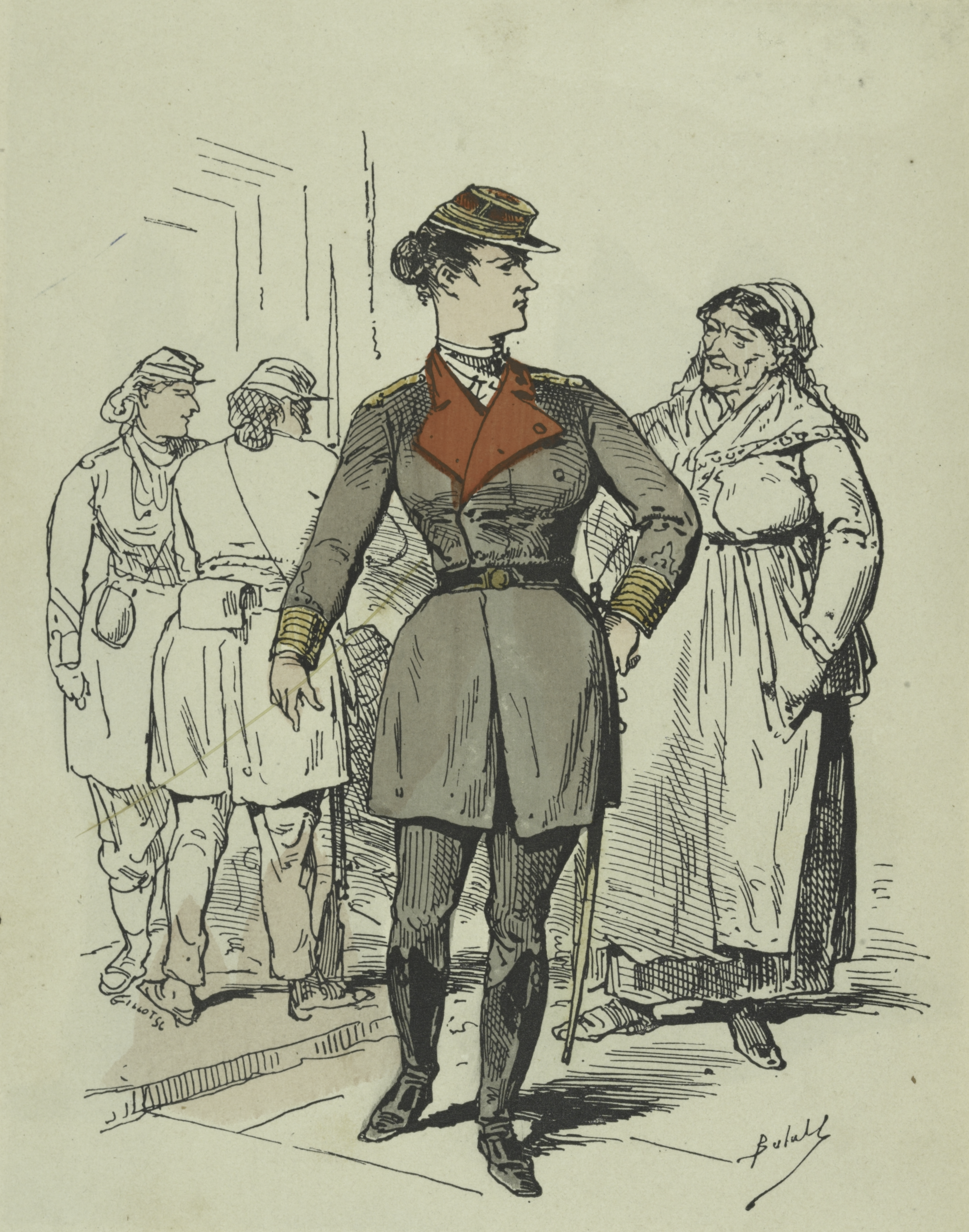
"The Colonel" by Bertall in 1871 in Les Communeux : Types, caractères, costumes.

Witnesses' accounts of the number of women in the legion vary from 20 to 100. They wore a uniform with a red armband and belt and, above all, they were armed. The presence of weapons was attested by external witnesses — who mentioned the presence of revolvers and personal rifles — interested parties denied it before the court martial. The volunteers were organized militarily, with women officers at their head, and many witness accounts, preserved in the dossiers of the courts martial, attest to many parades in front of the Place de la Bastille next to the town hall of the 12th arrondissement.

The unit was directed by Colonel Adélaïde Valentin, a worker, and her second-in-command, Captain Louise Neckbecker, a trim-maker. Several witnesses agree on the role of "Colonel Valentin", but no direct record has been found about her actions. Marie Catherine Rogissart, a seamstress, was the standard-bearer; she was also vice-president of the Club Éloi.

== Mission ==
The women were charged with arresting deserters or reporting them to the National Guard. The purpose was for deserting men to be publicly humiliated by women who had taken up arms. Their armed actions were to remain behind the front of combat, turned toward the interior of the city and supported by the men's forces. Many men testified to having been arrested by the National Guard following denunciation by these women; they described them as "shrews" or "terrors in the neighbourhood".

The women of the Legion regularly met at Club Éloi, held at Saint-Éloi Church in the 12th arrondissement, where they organized nine meetings after 10 May. They called on other women to join them; several of their speeches were remarked upon by Paul Fontoulieu, author of Les Églises de Paris sous la Commune, who was an anti-communard but generally reliable witness. Among others, Colonel Adélaïde Valentin would have threatened men with weapons if they did not rejoin the front.

Although women had been officially barred from the battlefield, when the Versailles forces invaded Paris during semaine sanglante ("bloody week"), women, including members of the Federated Legion of Women, took up arms and defended the city. During the courts martial that followed the suppression of the Commune, many women, including Louise Michel, denied having fought, in order to protect each other from retribution. However, there are many eyewitness accounts of women fighting at the barricades.

== Composition and members ==
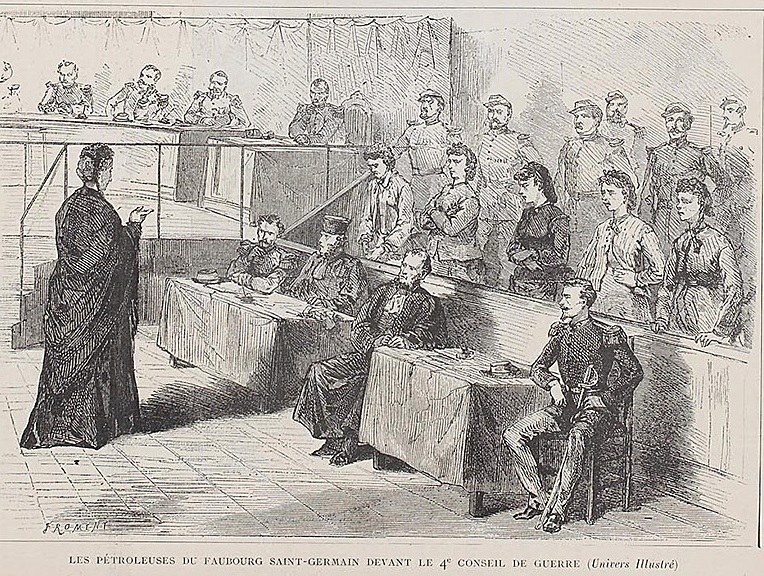
Les pétroleuses du faubourg Saint-Germain devant le 4e conseil de guerre ("The pétroleuses of Faubourg Saint-Germain in front of the 4th Court Martial), L'Univers illustré, engraving from 1871. Archives nationales, Paris.

According to the military dossiers of the women supposed to have been members of the legion, and those of the women mentioned in turn in those dossiers, historian Quentin Deluermoz concluded that members of the Federated Legion of Women were essentially from working-class backgrounds, but were often linked through their husband or their family to political power in the 12th arrondissement. For example, one of the women, Julie Marie Magot, née Armand, was married to Louis Magot, a delegate to the mayor.

Except for a few known only as names — Ménard, Ciron, Lambin — Julie Magot, Louise Neckbecker, Marie Rogissart, and Adélaïde Valentin are the only historically attested members of the legion. After the defeat of the Commune, they were subjected to heavy sentences: Julie Magot and her husband were sentenced to prison, Louise Neckbecker to five years in prison and ten years of surveillance, and Marie Catherine Rogissart to seven years of forced labour in New Caledonia. The fate of Adélaïde Valentin is unknown.

== See also ==
- Women in the Paris Commune
