= Octavie Tardiff =

French communist activist

- Born: Octavie Victoire Boulongne; 15 February 1833; Aumale
- Died: 25 October 1917 (aged 84); Hôpital Cochin
- Other names: Octavie Boulongne
- Occupations: political activist, trade unionist
- Known for: Paris Commune

Octavie Tardif, born Boulongne on (February 15, 1833- October 25, 1917) in Aumale, was a communist activist and member of the International Workers' Association (International), working as a dressmaker in Paris. She was involved in the actions undertaken by women in the Paris Commune, becoming in particular one of the leaders of the Union des femmes pour la défense de Paris et les soins aux blessés created by Elisabeth Dmitrieff and Nathalie Lemel.

== Activism ==
In October 1870, Octavie Tardif, along with four other citizens, submitted a complaint to the Paris City Hall, asking that :

able-bodied men who are not physicians or surgeons [be] replaced by women in the ambulance service

Their request was accepted.

As one of the leaders of the 13th arrondissement of the Union of Women for the Defense of Paris and the Care of the Wounded, founded on April 11, 1871, Octavie Tardif wrote a collective letter for the women workers addressed to Léo Frankel acting as a "delegate to the writings". The letter was signed by ten representatives of the women workers of Paris. In this letter, the women state that they were still waiting for a useful job and criticized the fact that the administration of the Commune was primarily concerned with politics. They expressed the opinion that the eradication of misery should be a priority and that politics would be "pure" when the economic question was settled, that is, brought by the emancipation of work, by eliminating the intermediaries and usurers between producers and final consumption of the product of their work. They opposed a feminine vision of "progress" and the “immobilism of your sex“.

On May 3, 1871, Octavie Tardif addressed a petition with 85 signatures to the Commission du travail et d'échange:

We need work, since our brothers, our husbands, our sons cannot provide for the family.

She was the secretary of the Pantheon of the International and, according to a police report of January 14, 1873, had sent the list of members of the International in the 13th arrondissement of Paris to the Military Justice.

== Bibliography ==
- Bantigny, Ludivine (2021). La Commune au présent : une correspondance par-delà le temps. La Découverte. p. 146. ISBN 978-2-348-06669-6. OCLC 1241123887.
