= Saint-Michel des Batignolles =

Roman Catholic Church in Paris, France

Coordinates: 48°53′21″N 2°19′28″E

Saint-Michel des Batiginolles
- Église Saint-Michel des Batignolles
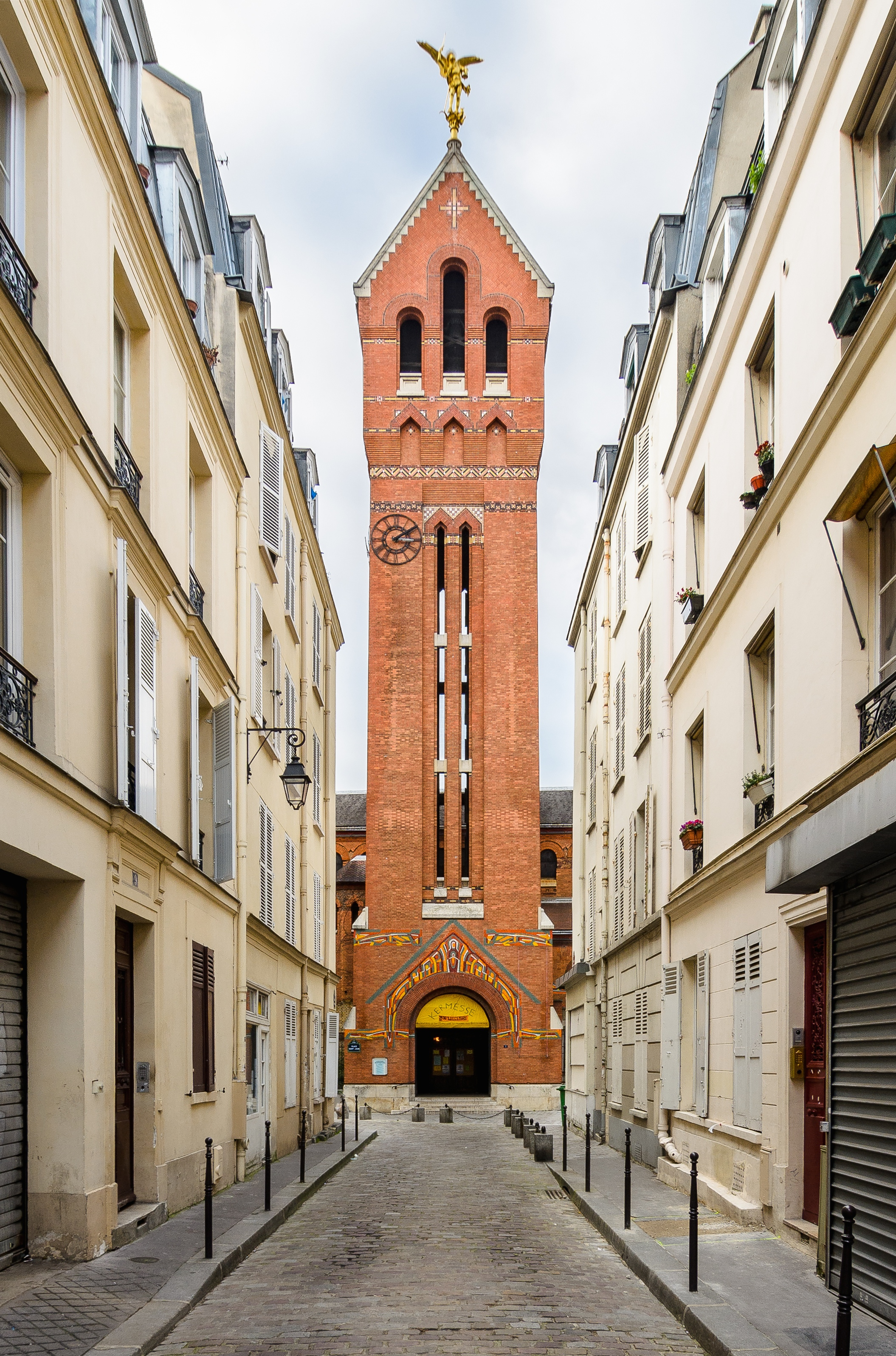
- Saint-Michel des Batiginolles
- Location: Place Saint-Jean, 17th arrondissement of Paris

History
- Founded: 1913

Architecture
- Style: Neo-Gothic
- Completed: 1938

Administration
- Archdiocese: Paris

Saint-Michel des Bagtignolles is a Roman Catholic church in the 17th arrondissement of Paris, located on Place Saint-Jean, at the corner of rue Saint-Jean and the Passage Saint-Michel. It was designed by the architect Bernard Haubold, and was built between 1913 and 1938.

== History ==
The first church of that name was originally constructed in six months in 1857 in commune of Batignolles-Monceau just outside the city limits of Paris, in an area known for its vineyards. It was brought into the city in with the annexation of the commune by Napoleon III.

During the Paris Commune in May 1871, the church was taken over by the Club of the Social Rvolution, a revolutionary society largely composed of women. including Andre Leo and Blanche Lefebvre. Blanche LeFebvre was killed on the barricades on 3 May, and Leo was captured and exiled to New Caledonia, along with Louise Michel.

The present church was begun in November 1913, but its construction was delayed by the outbreak of the First World War. The 35 meter long nave was dedicated in September 1925, The tribune was finished in 1928, and work on the bell tower resumed in 1932. The bells were installed and blessed in 1933, and the campanile was completed in 1934. In October 1934, the statue of the Archangel Saint Michael, was put in place at the top of the tower, 37 meters high. It is made from the same mold as the statue made by Fremiet for Mont-Saint-Michel.

== Exterior ==
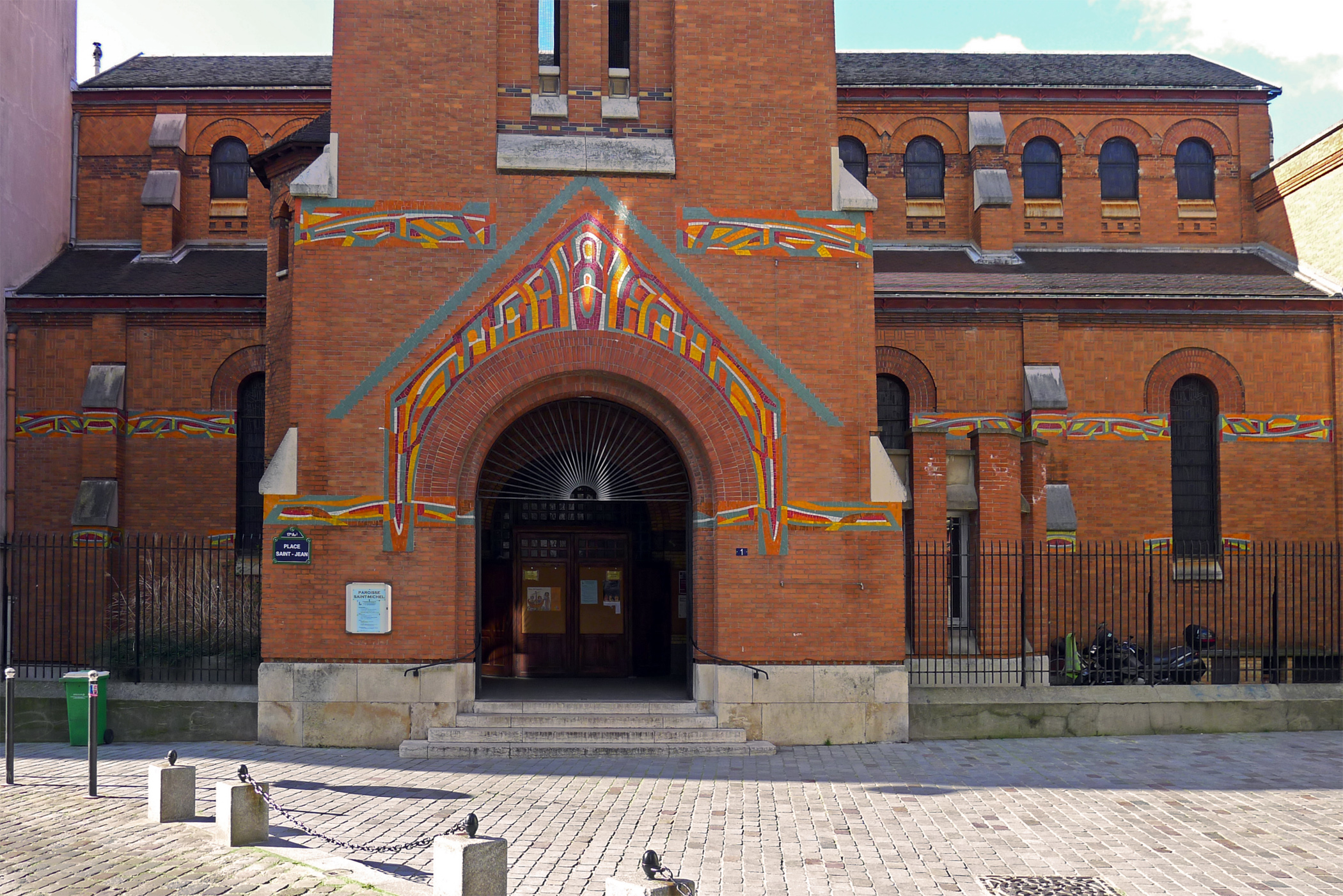
The portal on Place Saint-John.

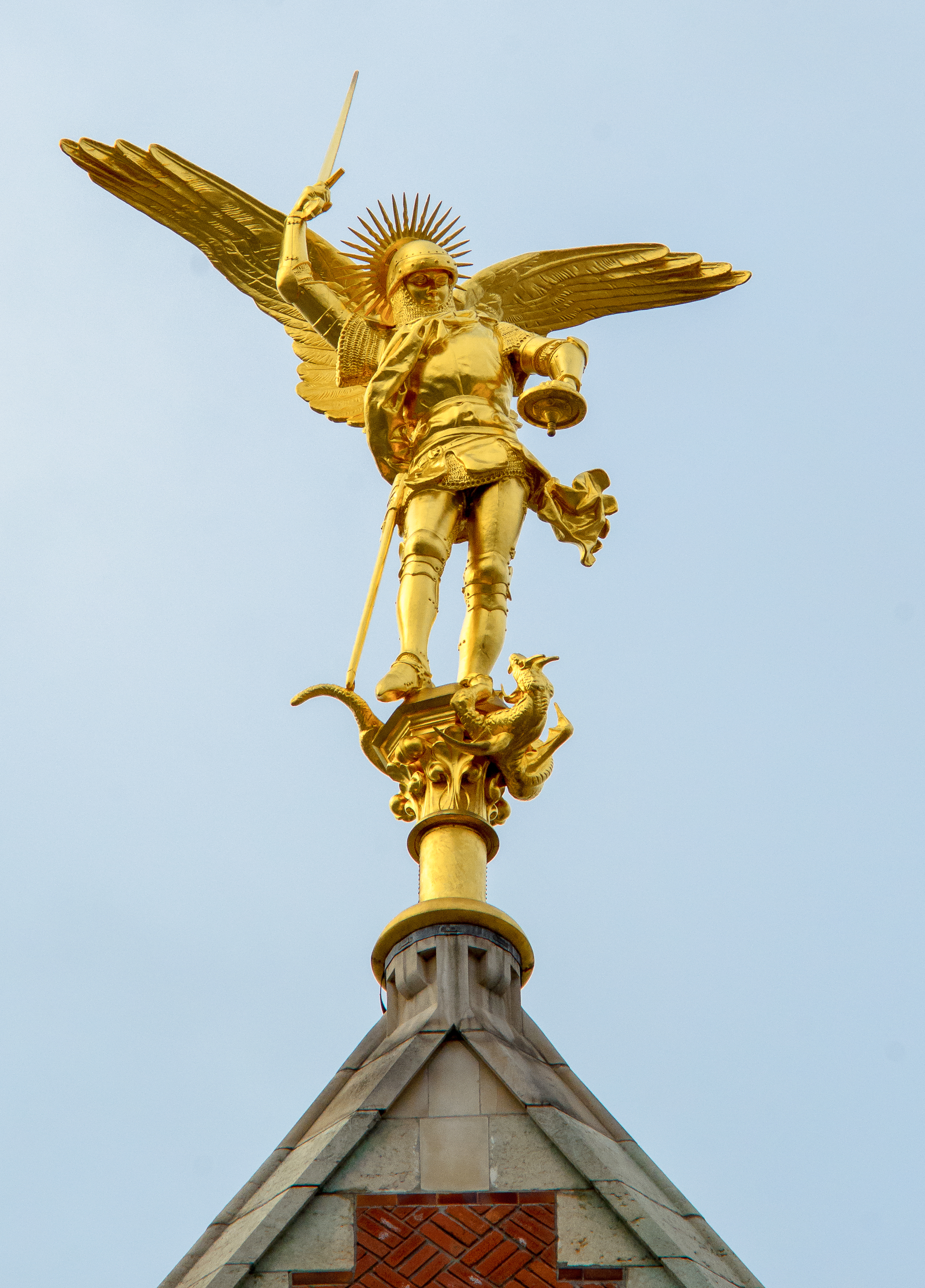
Statue of Archangel Michael slaying a dragon on the bell tower

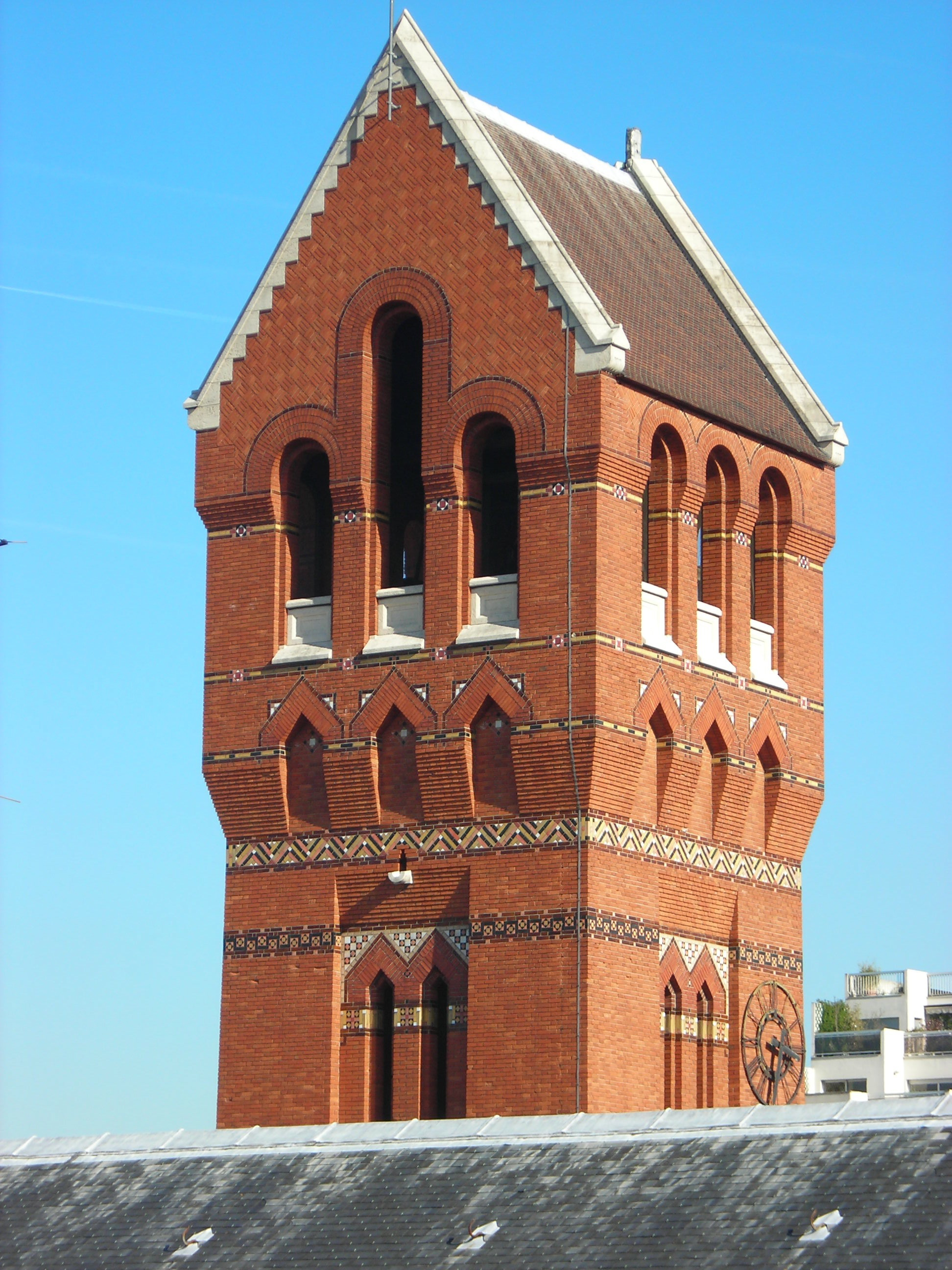
Top of the bell tower

Its most prominent feature is the statue of Saint Michael slaying a dragon. This statue is a copy of the statue atop the belltower of the Mont-Saint-Michel Abbey, made by the sculptor Emmanuel Fremiet.

== Interior ==
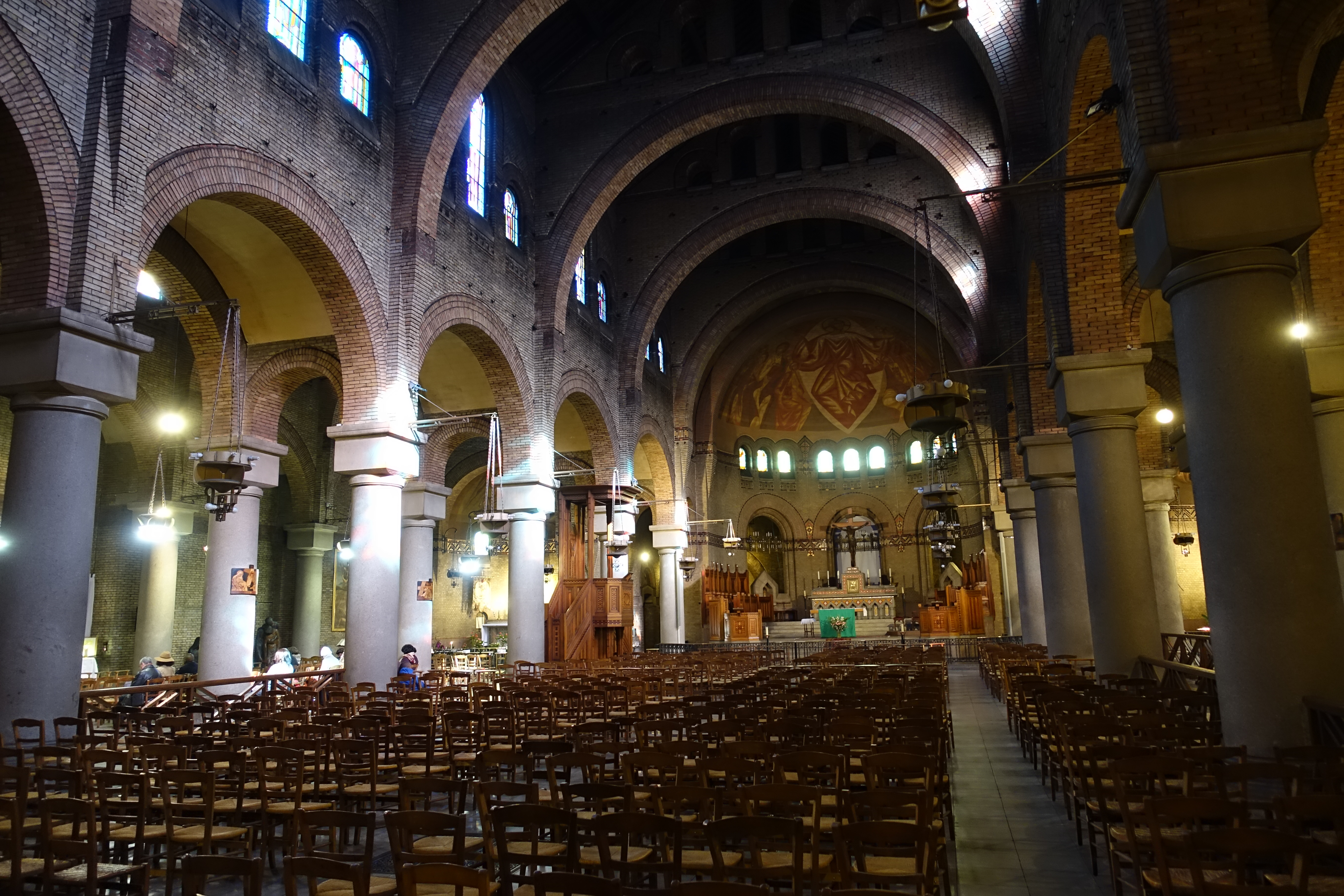
The nave facing the choir

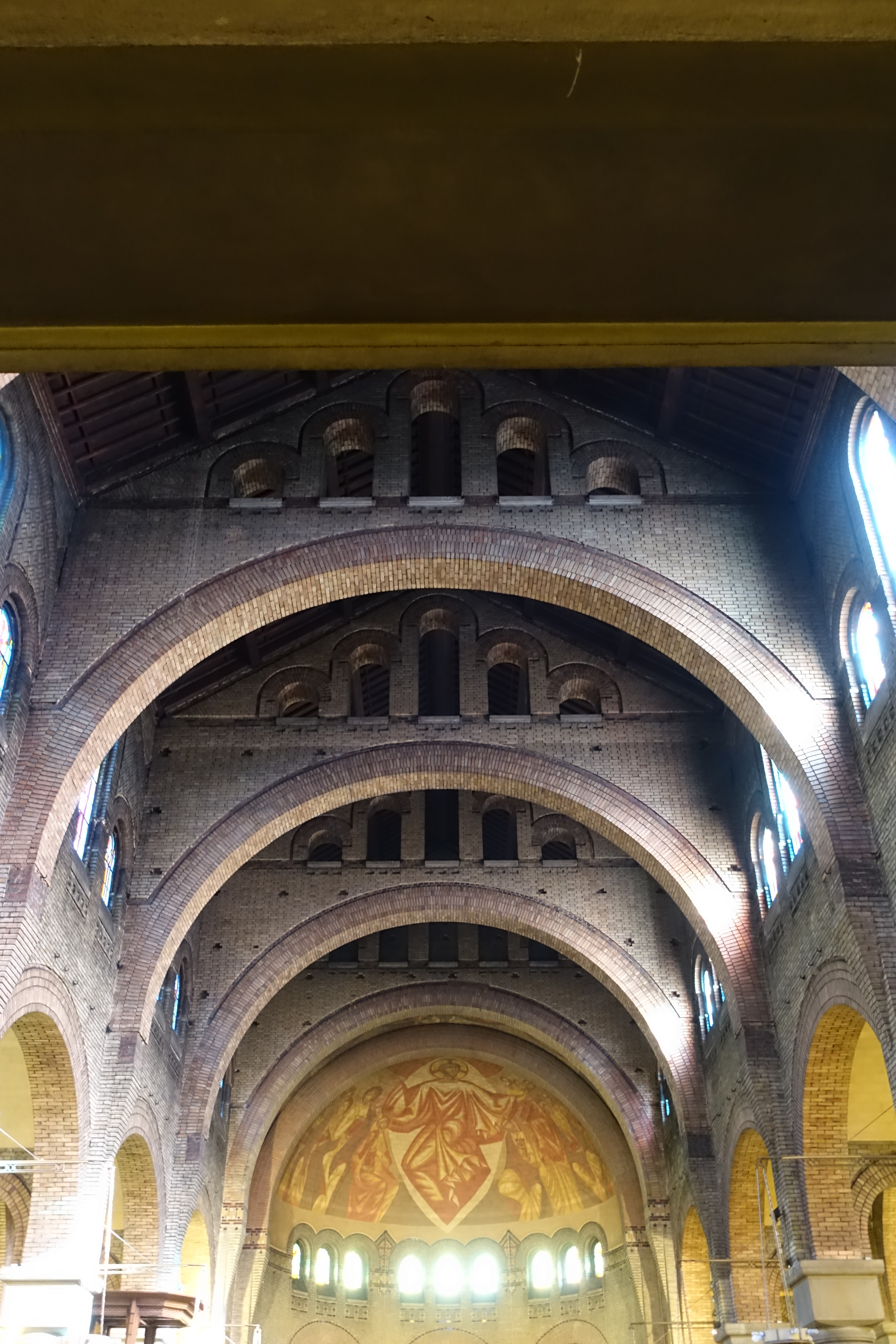
The arches of the choir

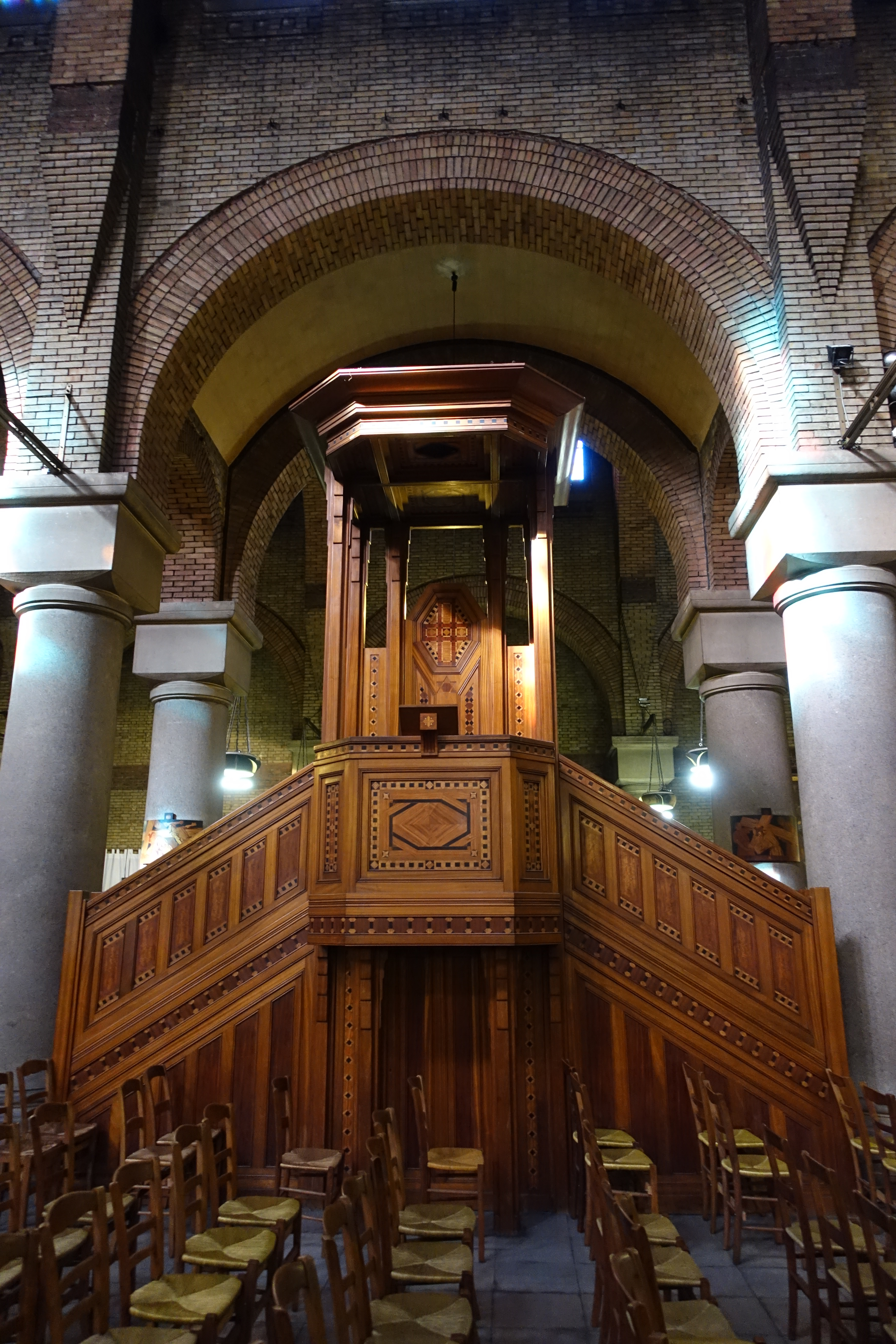
The pulpit

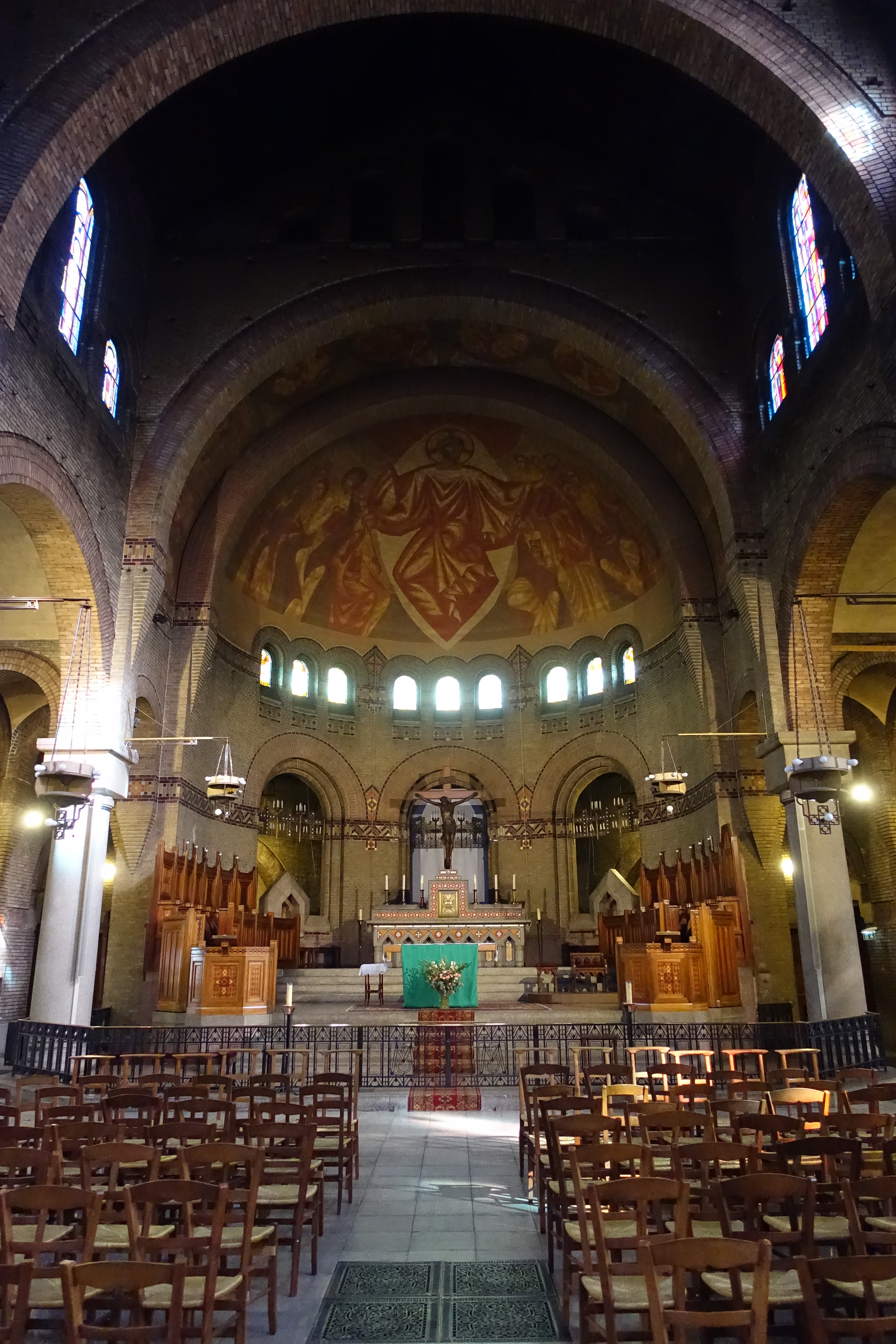
The Choir

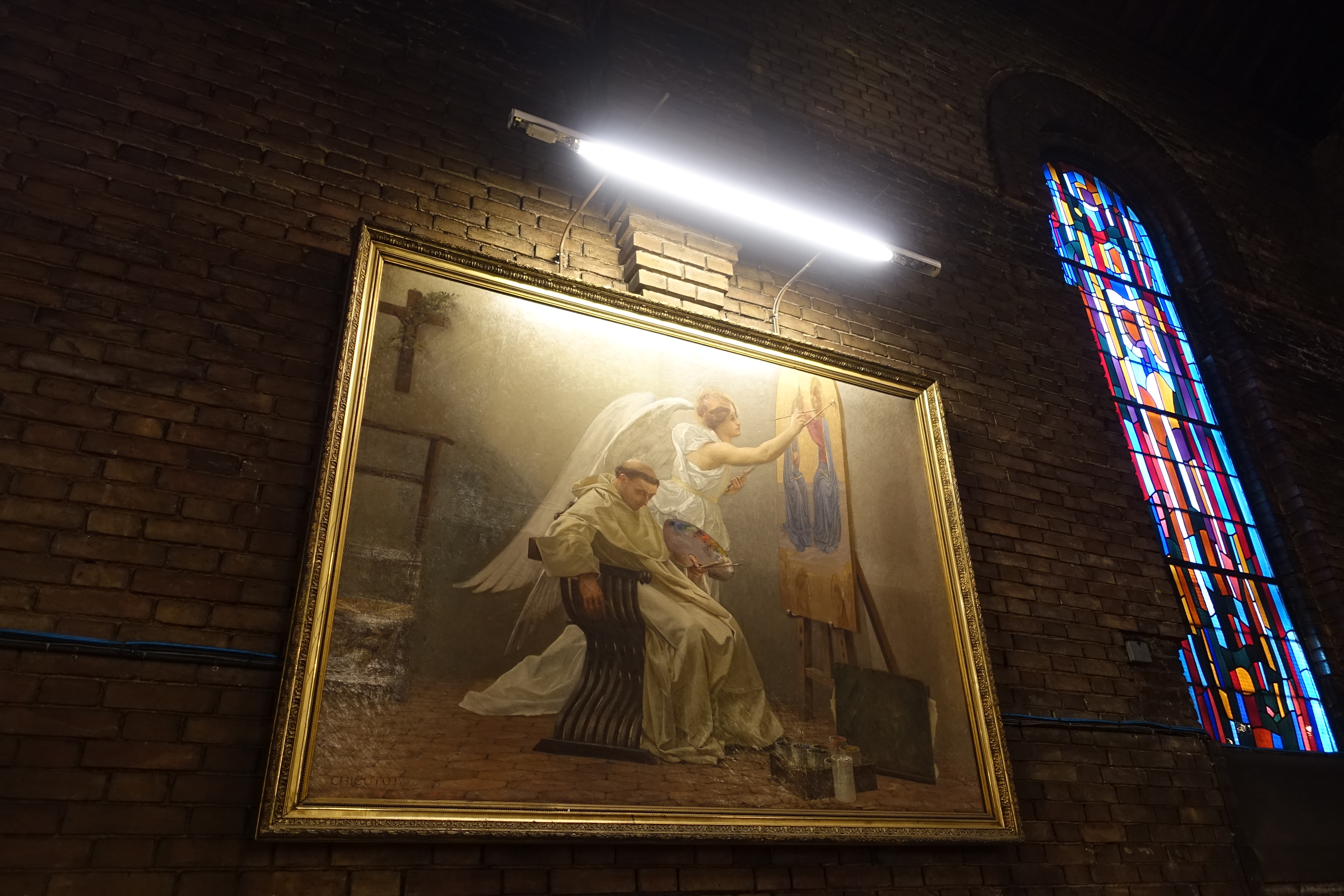
Art in the nave

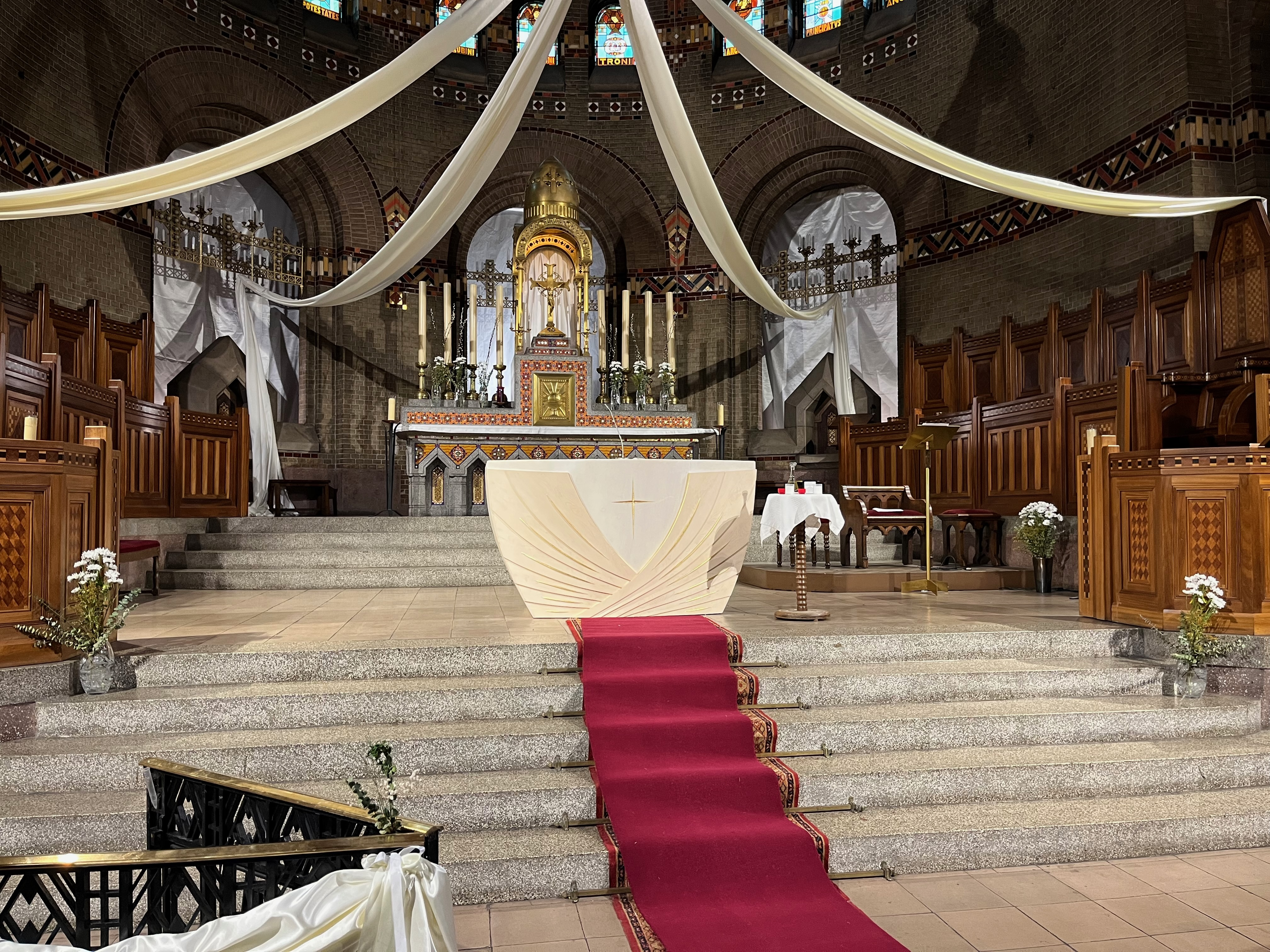
The new altar

== Organ ==
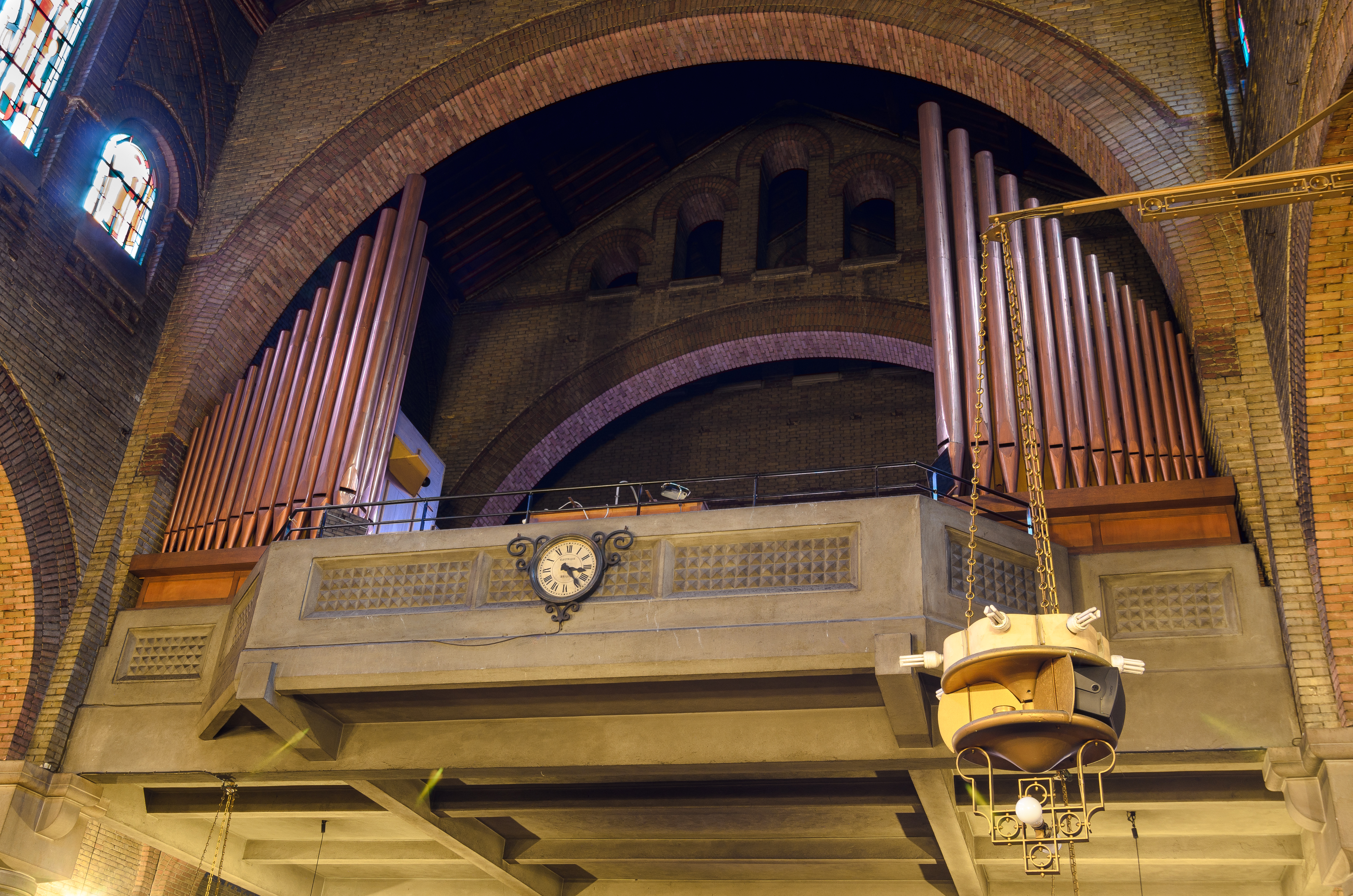
The organ

The organ of the church was built by the Czech firm of Rieger. It was originally a salon organ for the Hotel Majestic (now The Peninsula Paris hotel) with the main function of accompanying films.It underwent extensive updating by Gutschenritter in 1975.
