= Excoffon =

Excoffon is a surname. Notable people with the surname include:

- Béatrix Excoffon (1849–1916), French militant communard
- Roger Excoffon (1910–1983), French typeface and graphic designer
