= Union des femmes pour la défense de Paris et les soins aux blessés =

French women's group during the 1871 Paris Commune

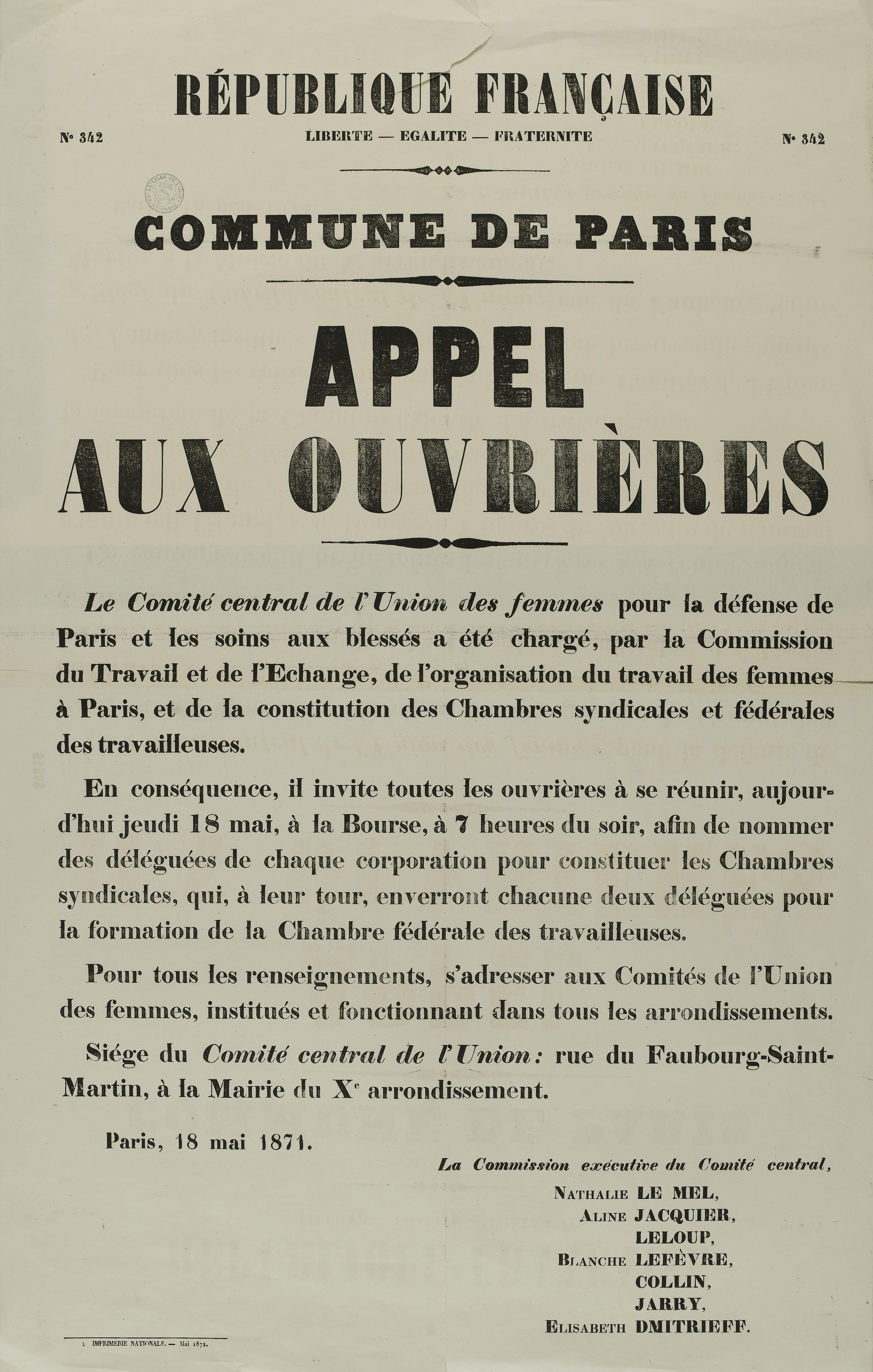
Paris Commune: "Call to Female Workers" of 18 May 1871, signed by the members of the executive committee

Union des femmes pour la défense de Paris et les soins aux blessés (English: Women's Union to Defend Paris and Care for the Wounded) was a women's group during the 1871 Paris Commune. The union organized working women, ensured a market and fair pay for their work, and participated in the defence of Paris against the troops of the Third Republic, particularly at Place Blanche.

== History ==
It was founded by Elisabeth Dmitrieff on 11 April 1871 in the Larched room (79 Temple Road) in the 10th arrondissement, Dmitrieff, who had been sent to Paris from London by Karl Marx as a representative of the First International, was a member of the central committee and remained general secretary of the Union's executive committee, the only non-elected and non-revocable post of the organization. The executive committee was made of seven members. About 130 served in the union's central committee. Actual membership is estimated as being a thousand or more.

In April 1871, the group issued a call to Parisian women to form committees in each arrondissement for a collaborative women's movement in Paris's defense.

In early May, the women's union issued a manifesto calling equal treatment of gender, in line with the Commune's annulment of privileges and inequalities. The union also petitioned the Commune's economic director, Léo Frankel, for work for women. He recommended organizing workshops for women to work at home, to be designed by the women's union. The group investigated the needs of unemployed women and created cooperative workshops. It did not designate roles based on trades but centralized the distribution of orders for women to complete and return to the workshop for delivery. This system differed from the piece-work originally proposed by Commune officials, which would have preserved the order of women staying at home and previous style of labor. The union, instead, organized free producer associations to share out communal profits. They supported variety within trade work, elimination of gendered competition, reduced work hours, and equal pay for equal work.

The Commune's Committee of Public Safety had outlawed women on the battlefield on May 1, but the Union remained committed to its militancy. When a widely published statement attributed to "the women of Paris" appeared later in May, calling for "peace at any price", the Union responded with a manifesto that asserted, "it is not peace, but all-out war that the working women of Paris claim! Today conciliation would be treason! ... The women of Paris will prove to France and to the world that they will also know, at the moment of supreme danger—on the barricades, on the ramparts of Paris, if the reactionaries force the gates—to give as their brothers their blood and their life for the defense and triumph of the Commune, that is to say the people!"

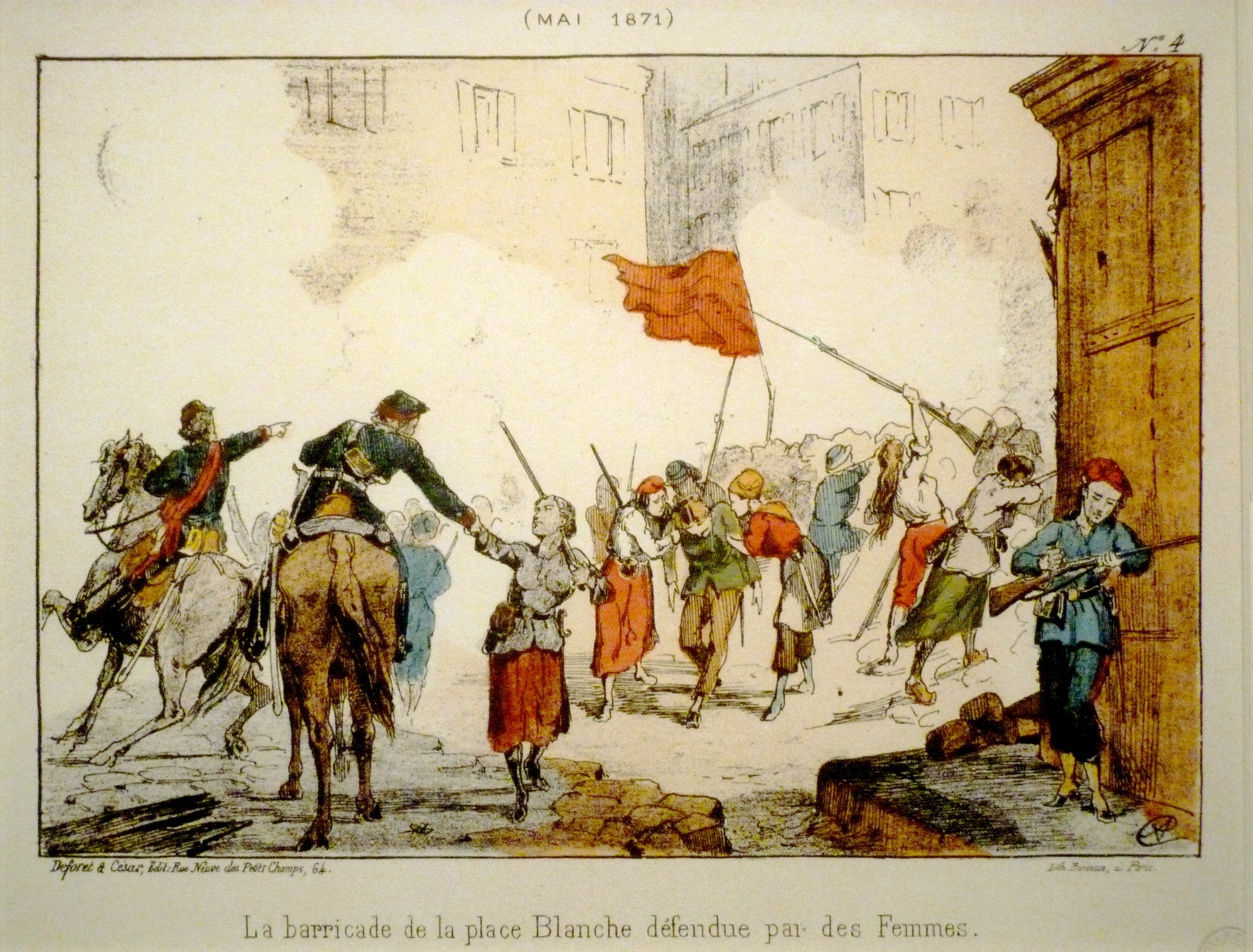
Barricade defended by women during semaine sanglante. Lithograph by Moloch. Musée Carnavalet, Paris.

== Known members ==
=== Executive committee ===
- Elisabeth Dmitrieff, general secretary
- Nathalie Lemel
- Aline Jacquier
- Blanche Lefebvre
- Marie Leloup
- Aglaë Jarry
- Madame Collin
- Adèle Gauvain (or Gauvin)

=== Committee leaders by arrondissement ===
1. Anne Maillet, seamstress
2. (none)
3. Marquant, mechanic
4. Angelina Sabatier, hatter
5. Victorine Pievaux, chamareuse
6. Nathalie Lemel, bookbinder
7. Octavie Vataire, laundress (lingère)
8. Marie Picot, unknown
9. Bessaiche, seamstress
10. Blanche Lefebvre, laundress (blanchisseuse)
11. Marie Leloup, seamstress
12. Foret, seamstress
13. Chantraile, no profession
14. Rivière, waistcoat-maker (giletière)
15. (none)
16. Aline Jacquier, waistcoat-maker (giletière)
17. Aglaë Jarry, no profession
18. Blondeau, gold-polisher
19. Jeanne Musset, seamstress
20. Adèle Gauvain, cardboard-maker (cartonnière)

=== Other members ===
- Adélaïde Valentin, delegate to the Central Provisional Committee
- Marie Chiffon, ambulance nurse
- Octavie Tardiff, member
- Victorine Gorget, member
- Noémie Colleville, Sophie Graix, Joséphine Prat, Céline Delvainquier, Aimée Delvainquier

== Bibliography ==
- Bard, Christine; Chaperon, Sylvie (2017). Dictionnaire des féministes: France, XVIII^{e}-XXI^{e} siècle. ISBN 978-2-13-078720-4. OCLC 972902161.
- Braibant, Sylvie (1993). Élisabeth Dmitrieff : aristocrate et pétroleuse. Belfond. ISBN 2-7144-2963-7. OCLC 28516706.
- Breaugh, Martin (2013). The Plebeian Experience: A Discontinuous History of Political Freedom. Columbia Studies in Political Thought/Political History. Translated by Lederhendler, Lazer. New York: Columbia University Press. ISBN 978-0-231-15618-9.
- Eichner, Carolyn Jeanne (2022). The Paris Commune : a brief history. New Brunswick. ISBN 9781978827684.
- Eichner, Carolyn J. (2004). Surmounting the Barricades: Women in the Paris Commune. Bloomington, IN: Indiana University Press. ISBN 0-253-34442-5.
- Jones, Kathleen; Vergès, Françoise (January 1991). "'Aux citoyennes!': Women, politics, and the Paris Commune of 1871". History of European Ideas. 13 (6): 711–732. doi:10.1016/0191-6599(91)90137-N. ISSN 0191-6599.
- Schulkind, Eugene (1985). "Socialist Women during the 1871 Paris Commune". Past & Present (106): 124–163. doi:10.1093/past/106.1.124. JSTOR 650641.
- Thomas, Édith (1963). Les Pétroleuses (in French). Éditions Gallimard. pp. 114, 125, 247.
- — (1966). The Women Incendiaries. Translated by Atkinson, James; Atkinson, Starr. New York: George Braziller, Inc.
