= Victorine Gorget =

French laundress and political activist

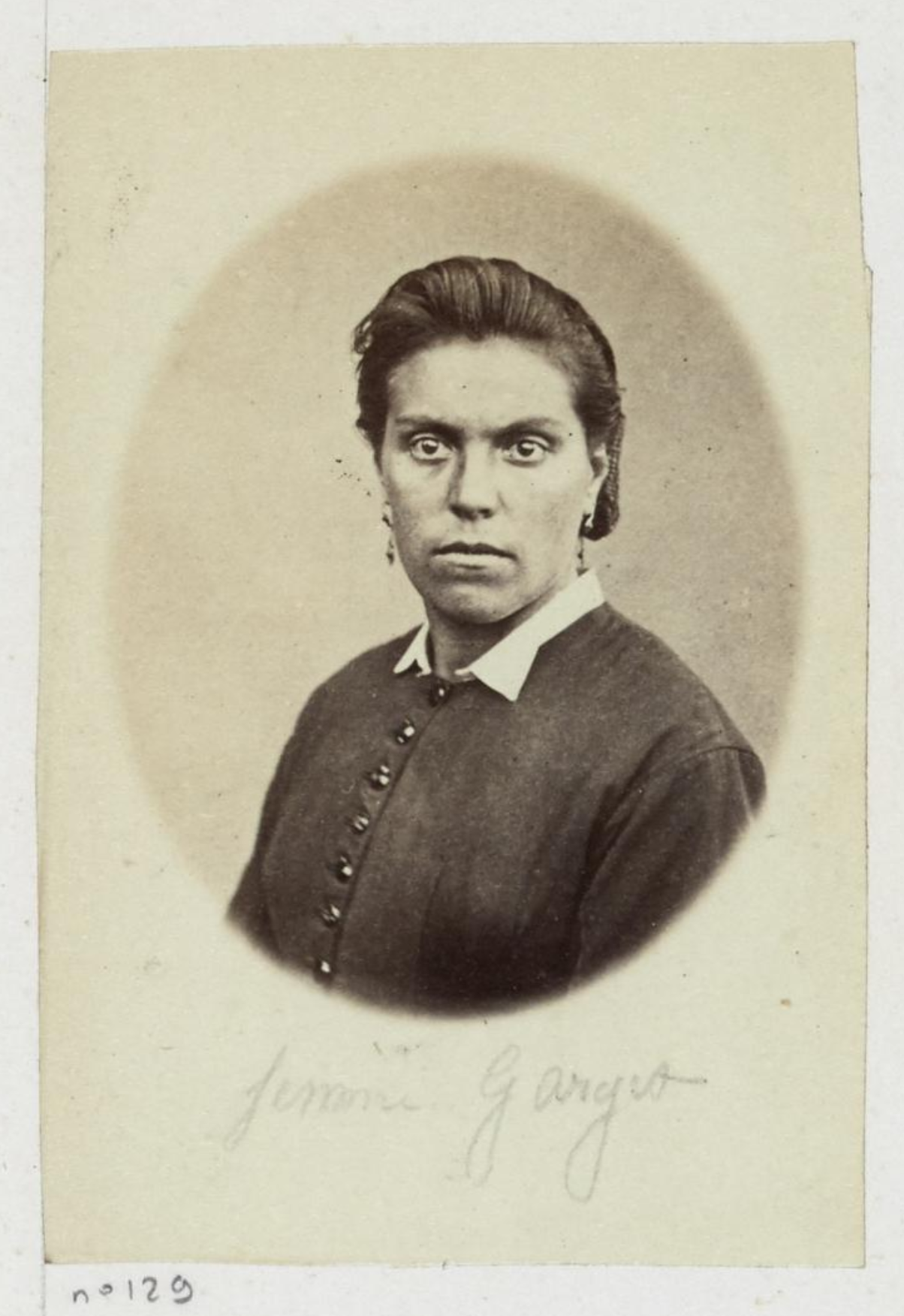
- Born: April 20, 1843; Paris
- Died: October 11, 1901 (aged 58); Nouméa
- Occupations: laundress, anarchist
- Known for: Paris Commune of 1871

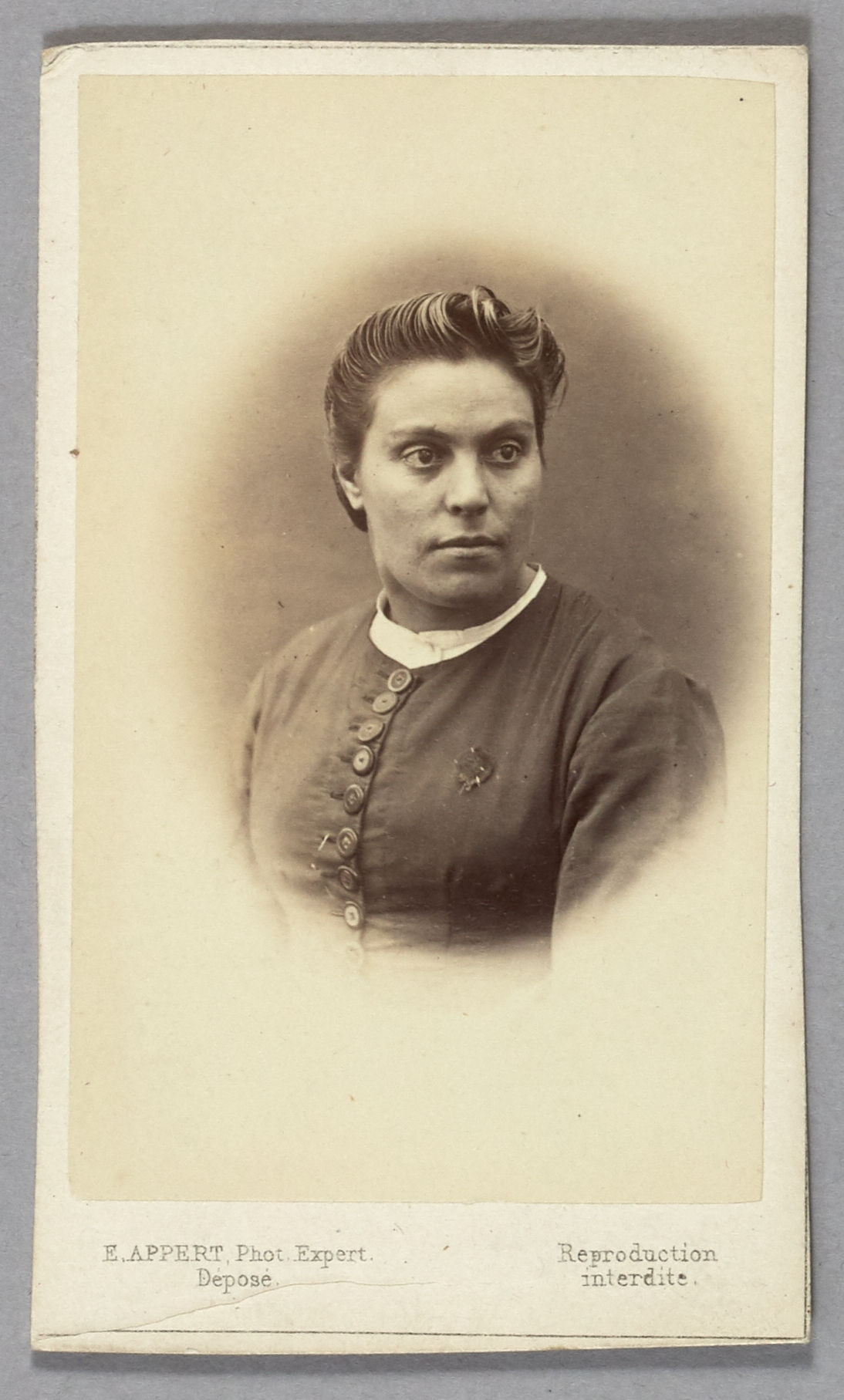
Portrait of Victorine Gorget, taken at the Prison des Chantiers

Victorine Gorget (April 20, 1843, in Paris – October 11, 1901, in Nouméa), was a laundress and a political activist during the Paris Commune of 1871.

== Biography ==
Daughter of Edmet Gorget and Éléonore Cochon, Victorine Gorget was a Parisian laundress. She was 1.65 m tall, has black eyes and a brown complexion. She married Edmond Nicolas Lefèvre, a woodcarver, on August 22, 1872, and moved with him to 5 rue de Chartres in the 18th arrondissement in eastern Paris. She later married for the second time at the age of 32 Jean-Baptiste Puissant, on December 2, 1875, and for the third time, at the age of 48, Louis Félix Roffidal, on July 1, 1891, in Papeete.

During the Paris Commune, when she was 28 years old, Victorine Lefèvre was a frequent visitor to the Saint-Michel des Batignolles club in the 17th arrondissement. Considered a leader, she would have proclaimed "that the ladies must take up arms to guard the ramparts, while the men go out against the troops of Versailles". Victorine Gorget was also very active in the l'Union des femmes pour la défense de Paris et les soins aux blessés.

Denounced by neighbors, she was sentenced to deportation on March 30, 1872, by the Fourth Council of War for "inciting civil war and provoking, by speeches, shouts or threats in public places, to commit crimes and to gather insurgents. As a female individual, the question of intimacy and morality are intertwined in her interrogation while she is accused of political facts. Thus, in her interrogation, the Council of War reports the following exchange: "the story of the crucifix that you would have worn on your backside saying: 'Since I am making your acquaintance, you are going to kiss my ass'. - This is not true. I always persist in denying it as I have already done it ".

Condemned to the penal colony, with the 7th convoy of the Paris Commune, she passed through Brest on August 5, 1873, after having left the central prison of Auberive before embarking, on August 10, 1873, under the number 10, on the sailing frigate La Virginie from the island of Aix for a deportation to New Caledonia. The crossing at sea lasted four months: Louise Michel, Henri Messager and Henri Rousseau were all on the same boat.

Like most of the so-called simple deportees, Victorine Gorget was allowed to reside in Nouméa. There she worked as a laundress before becoming the manager of the baths. In 1875, she found herself imprisoned for eighteen months on the Ducos peninsula alongside the Communard women Marie Spinay and Jeanne Bertranine. She was accused of living illegitimately with Jean-Baptiste Joseph Puissant, a soldier born in 1840, who was sentenced to five years of hard labor for forging the signature of his captain.

On January 4, 1878, Victorine Gorget obtained the remission of her sentence and the obligation of residence was lifted on March 11, 1879.
