= Marie Chiffon =

French communard nurse (1835–1882)

Marie Chiffon (née Marie Augustine Gaboriaud; 1835–1882) was a militant republican who served as an ambulance nurse in the Paris Commune in 1871. She was known as "la Capitaine" ("the captain"). For her actions during the Commune, she was deported to New Caledonia. She died there in 1882.

== Biography ==
Born into a family of peasants on 24 August 1835 in Ardelay (Vendée), Marie Augustine Gaboriaud left to work as a washerwoman in Paris in the 1860s. On 15 January 1867, she married Jules Chiffon, a merchant from a family of stonemasons from the Dijon region.

During the Paris Commune, she joined the Union des femmes pour la défense de Paris et les soins aux blessés ("Women's Union for the Defence of Paris and Care of the Wounded") as an ambulance nurse.

Her husband had been elected captain of the 121st battalion of the National Guard on 28 March 1871, the day before the proclamation of the Commune Council. During the semaine sanglante ("bloody week"), when Versailles troops entered Paris, Chiffon and her husband defended the Pont d’Austerlitz and Boulevard Mazas. She allowed the National Guard to enter a house to defend Daumesnil Avenue, where she and her husband lived.

For her actions during the Commune, she was imprisoned at Versailles, then transferred to the prison at Auberive Abbey. Brought before the 4th Court Martial, she said, "I dare you to condemn me to death. You are too cowardly to kill me." The court condemned her to twenty years of forced labour on 11 May 1872. After the rejection of her appeal on 5 July 1872, she was deported on the Orne and arrived in Nouméa, New Caledonia, on 16 July 1874. Her sentence was remitted on 15 January 1879, but she stayed in New Caledonia. She died on 14 January 1882 at Magenta, Nouméa, and is buried there.

== Bibliography ==
- Louise Michel (1898). La Commune, Histoire et souvenirs (PDF). Paris.
- Centre de Documentation sur l'Histoire du Mouvement Ouvrier et du Travail en Vendée (2016). Femmes et Militantes: 7 portraits de femmes engagées dans le combat social en Vendée.
