= Marie Rogissart =

Militant French feminist (1841–1929)

Marie Catherine Rogissart (12 May 1841 - 7 August 1929) was a militant communard in the 12th arrondissement during the Paris Commune in 1871. She was a member of Club Éloi and the standard-bearer of the Federated Legion of Women. Arrested and deported to New Caledonia, she chose to remain there after the end of her sentence. In 1929, she was the last surviving communard deportee on the island.

== Biography ==
Marie Catherine Rogissart was born in 1841 into a family of nail-makers in Neufmanil, situated a few kilometres from the Belgian border. Of the four daughters of Jacques Rémi Rogissart and Marguerite Dominé, Marie Catherine was the only one to reach adulthood. She left Neufmanil for Paris and in 1861 set herself up as a seamstress in Belleville, a town that had recently been annexed to the capital city. She was single, then lived while still unmarried with a certain Touchet in the 11th arrondissement.

=== Siege of Paris and the Paris Commune ===
On 18 March 1871, the Paris Commune began. Women's movements were formed, like the Union des femmes on 11 April 1871. Women sought the right to work for equal pay. Rogissart participated in these movements from April 1871 onwards, and in May she took an active part in the meetings of the Club Éloi, which met in the Church of Saint Éloi in the 12th arrondissement, and joined the Federated Legion of Women. She spoke confidently and became the standard-bearer of the battalion. She participated in the search for hostages and in chasing down draft dodgers (all Parisian men aged 19 to 40 were obligated to join the National Guard).

On 21 May 1871, Versailles troops entered Paris, and Semaine sanglante began. During this week, she fought in the streets, but then she disappeared. She was eventually arrested on 26 June 1872, having been denounced, more than a year after the end of the Commune. In her modest room in the 4th arrondissement, a red poster from the Women's Battalion, a kerosene lamp, and a little kerosene for the lamp were found. Because of this, her name was immediately associated with the pétroleuses. She denied all the charges against her, but a witness, whom she had accused of being a Versailles spy, recalled one of Rogissart's speeches in Saint Éloi against deserters. Rogissart reportedly said: "I'll make you all go fight, you're nothing but a bunch of chair-warmers. Me, I'm a woman, and I have more courage than any of you. Like it or not, you're going to fight the Versailles murderers." (Note: "Je vous ferai partir tous, vous n'êtes que des fainéants. Moi, femme, j'ai plus de courage que vous tous. Bon gré, mal gré, vous vous battrez contre ces assassins de Versailles.") On 6 August 1872, the 20th session of the Versailles military tribunal sentenced her to seven years of forced labour. The sentence was commuted to deportation to New Caledonia. Of the 13,450 convicted communards, 2,989 were sentenced to deportation to New Caledonia, 20 of them women.

=== Deportation to New Caledonia ===
She embarked from Brest on the Orne on 11 January 1873, one year after the first deportations of the communards. The ship carried 340 officers and crew, along with passengers and 540 deportees, both political prisoners and people convicted under common law. Among them were 24 women, of whom Rogissart was the only political prisoner. There were even some children. On 4 May 1873 at 11:30am, the lookout announced that land was in sight after a long and trying journey. On 6 May, those convicted to deportation in a walled fortress, including Rogissart, reached the Ducos peninsula on foot.

Rogissart's sentence was reduced to five years on 11 June 1873. She married another deportee, Charles Émilien Girod, on 9 May 1874. Marriage between deportees was looked upon favourably by the authorities for its stabilising and moral elements, and because of the potential to increase the population of the colony. In 1875, Rogissart's sentence was reduced a second time, to four years. However, a person sentenced to less than eight years of deportation was forced, at the end of their sentence, to reside in the colony for a length of time equal to their sentence. The end of a sentence did not mean freedom.

When the communards were given amnesty in 1880, Rogissart was one of the few deportees to remain on the island. Only one other woman, Alexandrine Simon, stayed. Remarried, Rogissart died at the age of 88 on 7 August 1929, at the hospice in Nouméa, six years after Jean Roch Chalier, who is sometimes described as the last remaining deportee. At about this time, Rogissart's great-grandnephew, Jean Rogissart, a teacher in Ardennes, began his literary career.

== Notes and references ==
=== Bibliography ===
- Ballière, Achille (1889). Souvenirs d'un évadé de Nouméa (in French). Éditions Charpentier.
- Barbançon, Louis-José (2003). L'archipel des forçats, histoire du bagne de Nouvelle-Calédonie (in French). Presses universitaires du Septentrion. p. 359. ISBN 9782859397852.
- Baronnet, Jean; Chalou, Jean (1987). Communards en Nouvelle-Calédonie, histoire de la déportation (in French). Mercure de France.
- Cornet, Claude (1999). "Marie Rogissart". Communards, puis Calédoniens: la vie et la descendance des déportés politiques en Nouvelle-Calédonie (in French). Éditions de la Boudeuse. p. 123.
- Dulotel, Alain (1997). "Les femmes dans les clubs rouges 1870-1871". In Corbin, Alain; Lalouette, Jacqueline; Riot-Sarcey, Michèle (eds.). Femmes dans la cité, 1815-1871 (in French). Grâne (France): Créaphis. pp. 293–304. ISBN 2-907150-82-0. OCLC 38299381.
- Krakovitch, Odile (1998). Les femmes bagnardes (in French). Éditions Perrin.
- Mailhe, Germaine (1995). Déportation en Nouvelle-Calédonie des communards et des révoltés de la Grande Kabylie (1872-1876) (in French). Éditions L’Harmattan.
- Maitron, Jean (2020-06-30), "ROGISSART Marie, Catherine", Le Maitron (in French), Paris: Maitron/Editions de l'Atelier
- Michel, Louise (1999). La Commune. Histoire et Souvenirs (in French). Éditions La Découverte.
- Pérennès, Roger; Chantepie, Frank (1991). "Rogissart Marie Catherine". Déportés et forçats de la commune : de Belleville à Nouméa (in French). Ouest Éditions. p. 576.
- Rey, Claudine; Gayat, Annie; Pepino, Sylvie (2013). "Rogissard Marie Catherine ou Marguerite". Petit dictionnaire des femmes de la Commune (in French). Éditions Le bruit des autres. p. 241-242.
- Thomas, Édith (1963). Les Pétroleuses (in French). Éditions Gallimard. pp. 114, 125, 247.
- Thomas, Édith (1966). The Women Incendiaries. Translated by Atkinson, James; Atkinson, Starr. New York: George Braziller, Inc.
