= Béatrix Excoffon =

French communard (1849–1916)

Béatrix Excoffon, born Julia Euvrie or Œuvrie (10 July 1849 - 30 December 1916) was a militant communard who served as an ambulance nurse during the Paris Commune in 1871. She was vice-president of the Club des Femmes de la Boule Noire, and was known as "the republican".

== Life ==
Excoffon was born in Cherbourg on 10 July 1849. In 1870, she was living in Paris with her partner, François, a printer. They had two children.

In La Commune, Louise Michel relates that Sophie Poirier, Blin, and Excoffon asked her to join them in creating the Comité de vigilance de Montmartre. That committee then organized the Club des Femmes de la Boule Noire, and Excoffon became its vice-president. Sophie Poirier became its president. She requisitioned an apartment at 32 rue des Acacias in Paris, where she lived, for the use of the Vigilance Committee.

At a meeting of the club of the Salle Ragache at the beginning of April, she said, "there are enough of us to attend to the wounded." On 3 April 1871, Excoffon took part in a women's march to Versailles, where the National Assembly was located, reminiscent of the march of October 1789. Excoffon set up a mobile ambulance at Fort d'Issy for the Enfants-Perdus for a fortnight. Excoffon's ambulance was joined by Alix Payen, who first became an ambulance nurse on the day her husband was wounded in the eye.

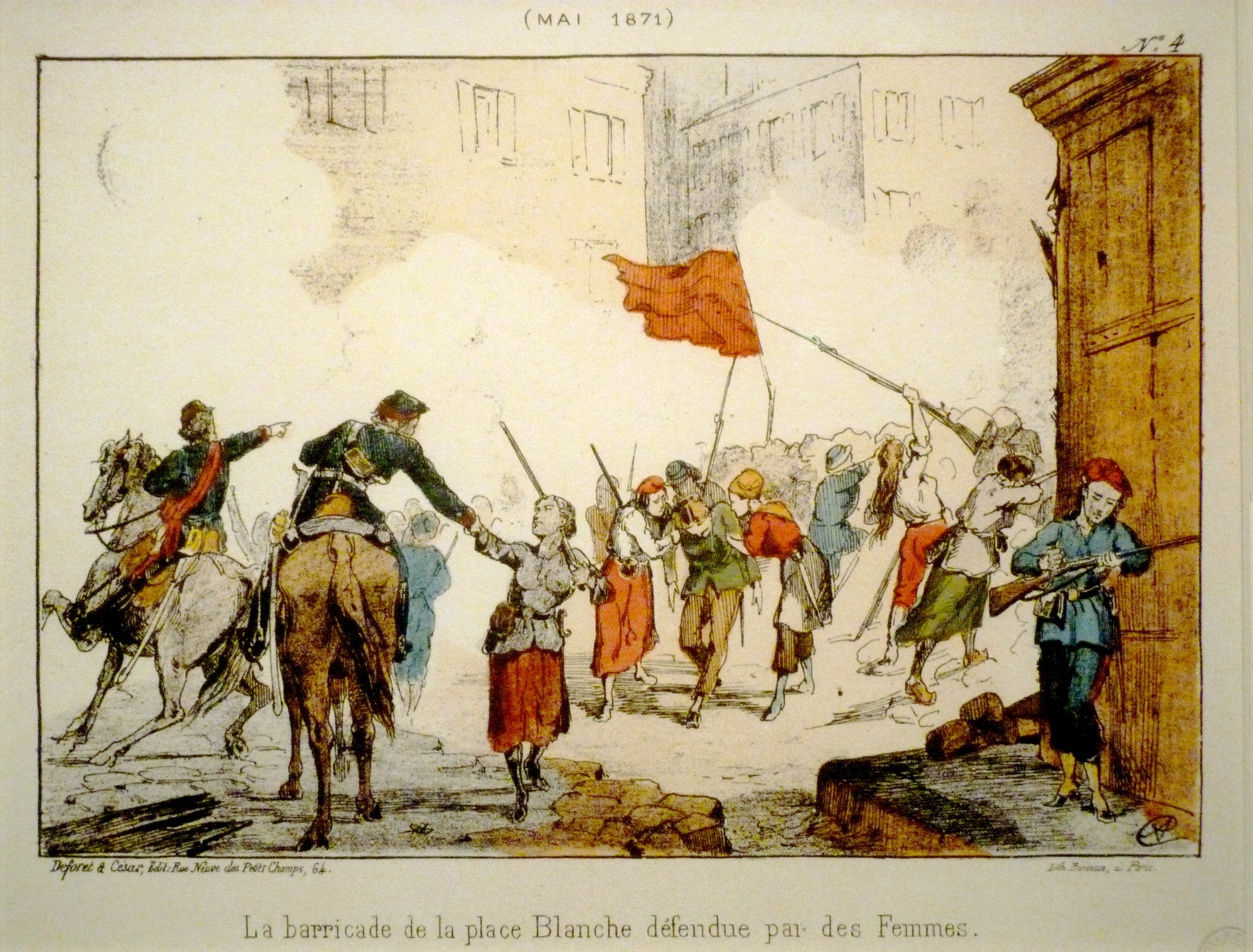
La barricade de la place Blanche défendue par des femmes, lithography by Hector Moloch

During Bloody Week, when the Versailles troops entered Paris, Excoffon defended place Blanche at the barricades on 23 May 1871 along with Élisabeth Dmitrieff, Nathalie Lemel, Blanche Lefebvre, and Malvina Poulain, also an ambulance nurse. 120 women delayed General Clinchant's troops before retreating, exhausted and low on ammunition, to place Pigalle.

After the end of the Commune, she was detained at Satory, along with Louise Michel. The 4th Court Martial condemned her to deportation to a fortress on 13 October 1871. She was then imprisoned in Auberive. Louise Michel asked Victor Hugo to intervene on her behalf, since her parents and brother-in-law had died recently. Her sentence was reduced to ten years of imprisonment on 28 March 1872, and reduced further by one year on 15 August 1876. Finally, Excoffon made an act of submission and her sentence was commuted, resulting in her release on 26 November 1878.

Excoffon and her partner married on 5 September 1874.
