= Place Blanche =

Square in Paris, France

Coordinates: 48°53′2″N 2°19′57″E

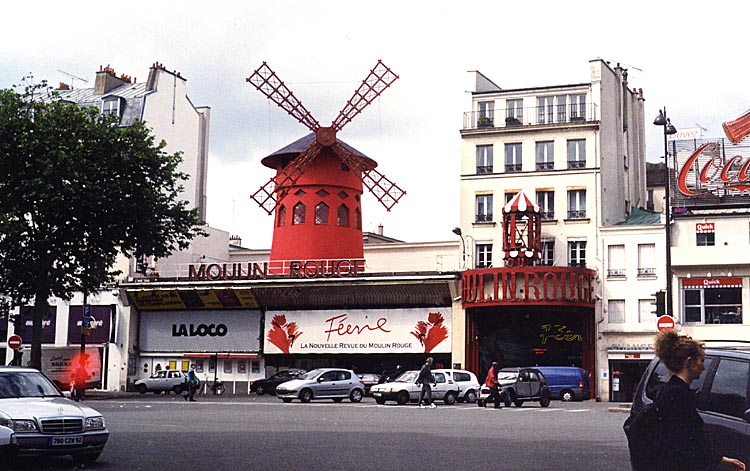
Moulin Rouge seen from the Place Blanche

The Place Blanche (French pronunciation: [plas blɑ̃ʃ]) in Paris, France, is one of the small plazas along the Boulevard de Clichy, which runs between the 9th and 18th arrondissements (Parisian districts) and leads into Montmartre. It is near Pigalle.

The famous cabaret Moulin Rouge stands on the Place Blanche.

== History ==
On 23 May 1871, during the Bloody Week at the end of the Paris Commune, when Versailles troops entered Paris to retake it for the French Third Republic, the Place Blanche was defended by 120 communard women. Among them were Béatrix Excoffon, Elisabeth Dmitrieff, Nathalie Lemel, Blanche Lefebvre, and Malvina Poulain. They held back General Clinchant's troops at a barricade before retreating, exhausted and out of ammunition, to Place Pigalle. Those who could not retreat were executed on the spot, among them Blanche Lefebvre.

During the 1950s, the Place Blanche was a centre of Paris' transsexual community, a fact documented in Christer Strömholm's book Les amies de Place Blanche.
