= Blanche Lefebvre =

Communarde (1847–1871)

Blanche Lefebvre (or Lefevre) (1847 - 23 May 1871) was a communard active in the Batignolles quarter in the 17th arrondissement of Paris. She died defending the Paris Commune during "bloody week".

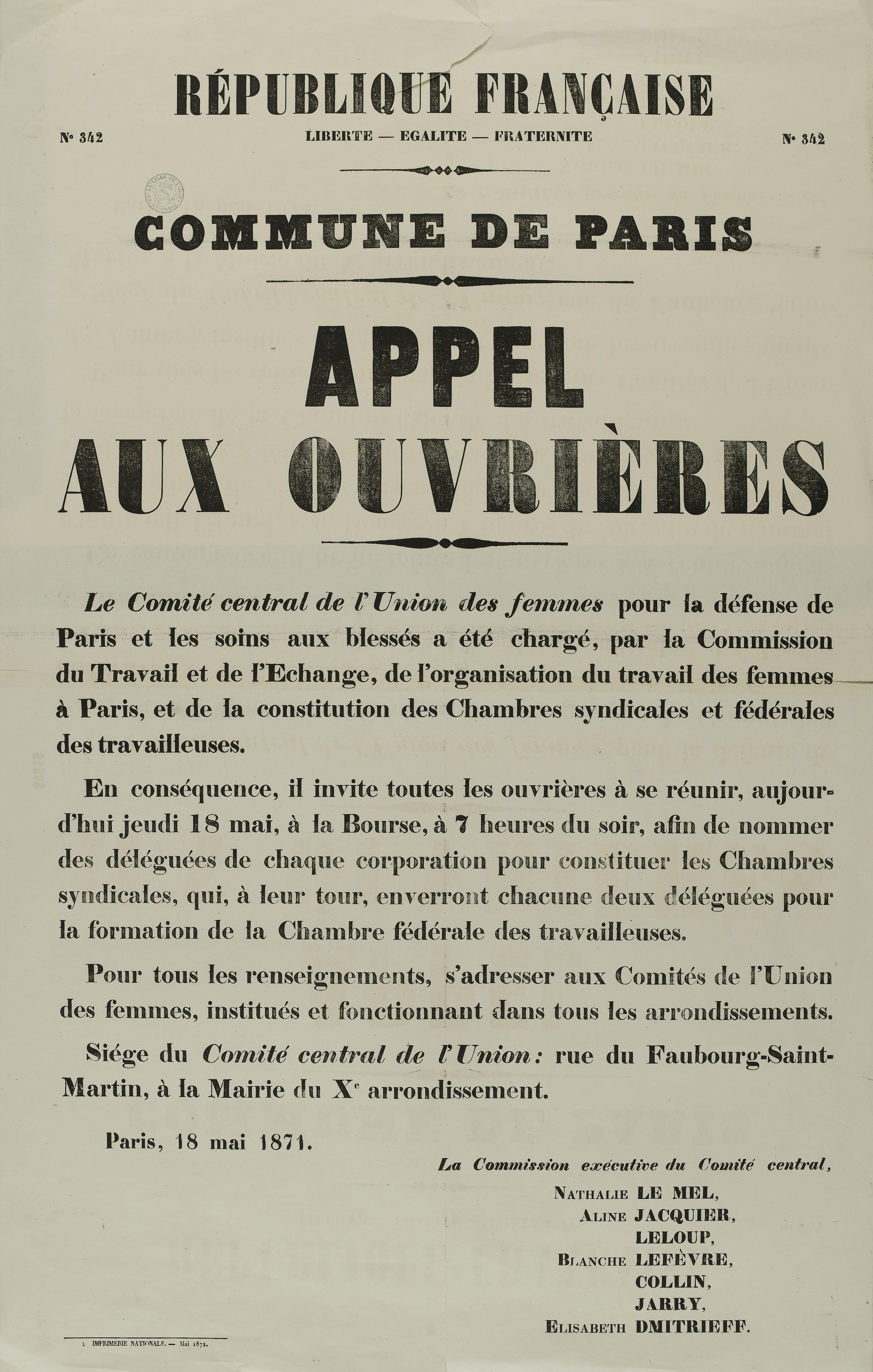
Call to the working women of Paris to join the Union des femmes during the 1871 Paris Commune, signed by Blanche Lefebvre

== Biography ==
Blanche Lefebvre was a laundress at the Sainte-Marie des Batignolles laundry. She lived at 34, rue des Maris, in the 10th arrondissement.

During the Paris Commune, she was a member of the Club de la Révolution sociale, which was founded on 3 May 1871 in the church of Sainte-Marie des Batignolles; her husband was the secretary. She was also a member of the executive committee of the Union des femmes pour la défense de Paris et les soins aux blessés ("Women's Union for the Defence of Paris and the Care of the Wounded"). She was known to always wear a red sash and carry a revolver.

Abbot Paul Fontoulieu, a strongly anti-communard but otherwise generally reliable contemporary, described Lefebvre as the "queen" of the podium at the Batignolles - and as a "terrible woman", a "fanatic" who "loved the insurrection as others love a man," capable of making any sacrifice for the Commune. He compared her to Théroigne de Méricourt and Charlotte Corday (not, in his opinion, a flattering comparison), and related a story in which she shot dead a Fédéré captain on 22 May for his cowardice in the face of the Commune's looming defeat.

Lefebvre was one of the women who participated in the defence of Place Blanche on 23 May 1871, along with Élisabeth Dmitrieff, Nathalie Lemel, Malvina Poulain, and Julia Béatrix Euvrie. She was killed fighting Versailles troops later that day, on the rue des Dames in the 17th arrondissement, on the Batignolles barricade.

== Legacy ==
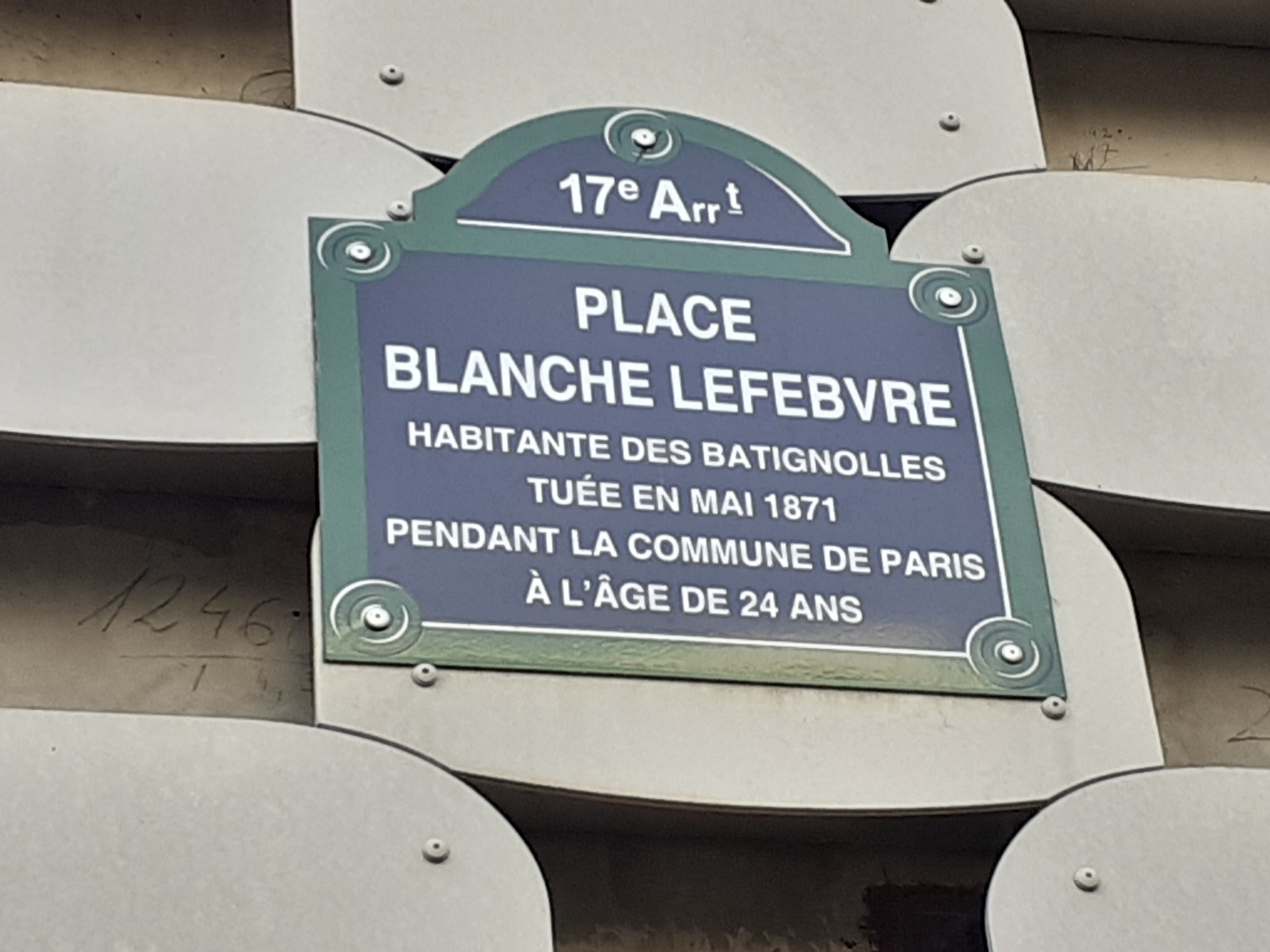
Commemorative plaque for Place Blanche Lefebvre

A square was created in 2012 with the provisional designation "BY/17". In June 2013, Paris city hall named it "Place Blanche Lefebvre".
