= Bertall =

French illustrator, cartoonist and engraver

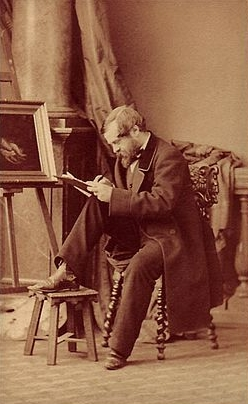
Bertall

Charles Albert d'Arnoux (Charles Constant Albert Nicolas, Vicomte d'Arnoux, Count of Limoges-Saint-Saëns), known as Bertall (or Bertal, an anagram of Albert) or Tortu-Goth (December 18, 1820, in Paris – March 24, 1882, in Soyons) was a French illustrator, engraver, caricaturist, and early photographer.

== Biography ==
His father was a former war commissioner. His family wanted him to study at the Ecole Polytechnique, but he chose to study painting, and spent several years in the studio of Michel Martin Drolling, at the end of which he decided to devote himself exclusively to illustration and caricature. On the advice of Balzac, who mentored him, he began signing his works under the name of Bertall, an adjusted anagram of his middle name. He married Albertine Cesarine Elisabeth Pellapra de Lolle and became the father of triplets on 17 August 1866. He was made Knight of the Legion of Honor on February 3, 1875.

He drew for Le Magasin pittoresque (fr), Musée des familles, La Semaine des enfants, Le Journal pour tous, La Bibliothèque des chemins de fer, and the Bibliothèque rose (fr). He provided 3,600 drawings for Les Romans populaires illustrés, published in 30 volumes by Gustave Barba between 1849 and 1855. He contributed numerous cartoons and comics to L'Illustration and La Semaine, the Journal pour rire (fr) and Le Grelot (fr). He also wrote and illustrated his own texts, including La Comédie de notre temps and La Vigne, voyage autour des vins de France.

A pioneer in photography, he collaborated with Hippolyte Bayard in 1855, then opened the Bayard and Bertall photography workshop (15 bis rue de la Madeleine, Paris) in the early 1860s until 1866. He started his own successful portraiture studio in 1866.

His Les Communeux, 1871. Types, caractères, costumes, was interpreted by scholar Michael Dorsch as "play[ing] into the public anxiety over the destructive force of the Commune through the depiction of established social norms thrown helter-skelter." Bertall claims a lack of political bias, as his drawings were based on his own eye-witness experience, but Dorsch assesses the book as decidedly propagandistic, associating Communards with violence and criminality. An 1873 version of the text was published with the English title The Communists of Paris 1871: Types, Physiognomies, Characters and accompanying English-language explanatory text, presumably to win support for the French monarchist position among British readers. Of particular interest to Bertall was depicting the Communard women's subversion of Second Empire gender norms, and Communard men's failure to live up to them.

== Publications ==
- Les Omnibus, pérégrinations burlesques à travers tous chemins, with Lefix (1843)
- Les Buses-Graves Prospectus publicitaire (1843) : Parody of Burgraves of Victor Hugo
- Les Guêpes à la Bourse (1847)
- Cahier des charges des chemins de fer (1847)
- Les Enfants d'aujourd'hui, album of caricatures (1848)
- La Revue comique à l'usage des gens sérieux (November 1848 - April 1849)
- Les Infortunes de Touche-à-tout (1861)
- Mlle Marie sans-soin (1867)
- M. Hurluberlu et ses déplorables aventures (1869)
- Les Communeux, 1871. Types, caractères, costumes (1871)
- Le Grelot au Salon. Le Salon de 1872 dépeint et dessiné par Bertall (1872)
- La Comédie de notre temps : études au crayon et à la plume. I. La civilité, les habitudes, les mœurs, les coutumes, les manières et les manies de notre époque. II. Les enfants, les jeunes, les mûrs, les vieux. III. La vie hors de chez soi : l'hiver, le printemps, l'été, l'automne (3 volumes, 1874-1876) Texte en ligne 1 2 3
- Les Contes de ma mère, recueillis et illustrés par Bertall (1877)
- La Vigne, voyage autour des vins de France : étude physiologique, anecdotique, historique, humoristique et même scientifique (1878) Texte en ligne
- Mademoiselle Jacasse (1879)
- Les Plages de France (1886)
- Georges le distrait (1889) Texte en ligne

Works illustrated by Bertall (solo or with others)

- Balzac : Œuvres complètes (20 volumes, 1842-1855)
- Eugène Briffault : Paris dans l'eau (1843)
- Pierre-Jules Hetzel : Nouvelles et Véritables Aventures de Tom Pouce (1844)
- Collectif : Le Diable à Paris. Paris et les Parisiens. Mœurs et coutumes, caractères et portraits des habitants de Paris, tableau complet de leur vie privée, publique, politique, artistique, littéraire, industrielle, etc. (2 volumes, 1845-1846)
- Balzac : Petites Misères de la vie conjugale (1845)
- Alexandre Dumas : La Bouillie de la comtesse Berthe (1845)
- Alexandre Dumas : Histoire d'un casse-noisette (1845)
- Paul Féval : Contes de nos pères (1845)
- Maurice Alhoy : Les Bagnes (1845)
- Maurice Alhoy et Louis Lurine : Les Prisons de Paris (1846)
- Octave Feuillet : Vie de Polichinelle et ses nombreuses aventures (1846)
- Léon Gozlan : Aventures du prince Chènevis (1846)
- Émile Souvestre : Le Monde tel qu'il sera (1846)
- Eugène Briffault : Paris à table (1846)
- Jean Anthelme Brillat-Savarin : Physiologie du goût (1848)
- Nicolas Boileau : Œuvres poétiques (1846)
- Bernardin de Saint-Pierre : Paul et Virginie (1849)
- James Fenimore Cooper : Le Dernier des Mohicans (1849)
- Charles Perrault : Contes (1852)
- Georges Bonnefond : Les Hôtels historiques de Paris (1852)
- Hoffmann : Contes fantastiques (1856)
- Jacques Porchat : Contes merveilleux (1858)
- Paul Boiteau : Légendes pour les enfants (1861)
- Comtesse de Ségur : Les Petites filles modèles (1863)
- Wilhelm Hauff : L'Auberge du Spessart, contes allemands (1863)
- Arthur de Gravillon : La Malice des choses (1867)
- Edmond Auguste Texier : Le Journal et le journaliste (1868)
- Miguel de Cervantes : Don Quichotte (1870)
- Alphonse Daudet : Les Petits Robinsons des caves ou le siège de Paris (1872)
- Jean Macé, Contes du petit château (1876)
- Paul de Kock : La Laitière de Montfermeil. Le Muletier (1878)
- Arthur de Rothschild : Histoire de la poste aux lettres et du timbre-poste depuis leurs origines jusqu'à nos jours (1880)
- Nathaniel Hawthorne : Le livre des merveilles Hachette, 1867
