= Nathalie Lemel =

French anarchist and feminist

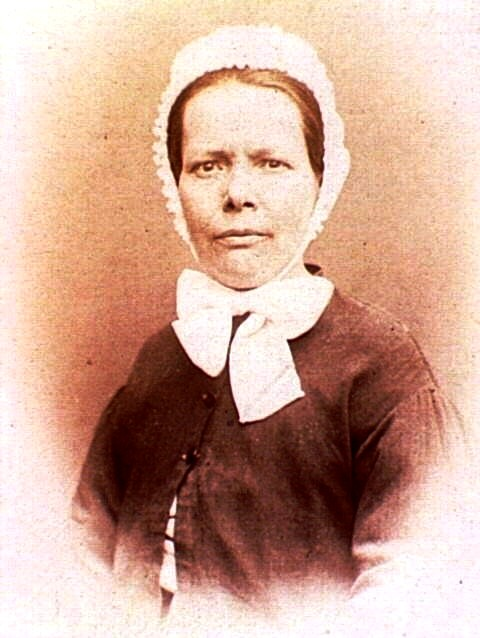
- Nathalie Lemel
- Born: 26 August 1827; Brest, Brittany, France
- Died: 1921 (aged 93–94); Ivry-sur-Seine, Val-de-Marne, France

Nathalie Lemel (French pronunciation: [natali ləmɛl]; 26 August 1827 – 1921) was a militant anarchist and feminist who participated on the barricades at the Commune de Paris of 1871. She was deported to Nouvelle Calédonie with Louise Michel.

== Bookbinder ==
Nathalie Lemel was born in Brest, in the Finistère department of Brittany, where her parents, the Duvals, owned a café. She was schooled until the age of twelve and then became a bookbinder. In 1845, she married Jérôme Lemel, another bookbinder. They had three children together. In 1849, the couple moved to Quimper where they opened a bookshop. Their business lasted until 1861, when the couple declared bankruptcy due to Jérôme's drinking problem. Nathalie left him with their three children and went to Paris in order to find work.

== Militant ==
She worked as a bookbinder and retailer in Paris, and then became a socialist activist. In 1864, the International Workers Association (IWA, aka First International) was created in London in the midst of the agitated social climate in Europe. In August 1864, Parisian bookbinders went on strike amid a major labor dispute, during which one of the best-known militants was Eugène Varlin. In 1865, Nathalie Lemel joined the First International. When a new strike was called, she was a member of the strike committee and was elected union delegate, which was a rare position for a woman to hold in those days. She distinguished herself by her determination and organisation: she fought notably for the equality of salaries between men and women. According to a police report,

She was noticed because of her intense excitement and her political activism; in the workshops, she read bad newspapers aloud; she assiduously frequented the [union] clubs.

This was in addition to her strong opposition to the Second Empire. In 1868, she left her home and family (mainly because of her husband's alcoholism), which did not help her reputation in the eyes of conservatives and the police. This increased freedom intensified her political activism: with Varlin and the other bookbinders, she participated in the creation of "The Housewife" ("La Ménagère"), a co-op, and "The Pot" ("La Marmite"), an open restaurant (that would account for four establishments in all for 8000 workers). She was employed there to prepare meals.

== Activist ==
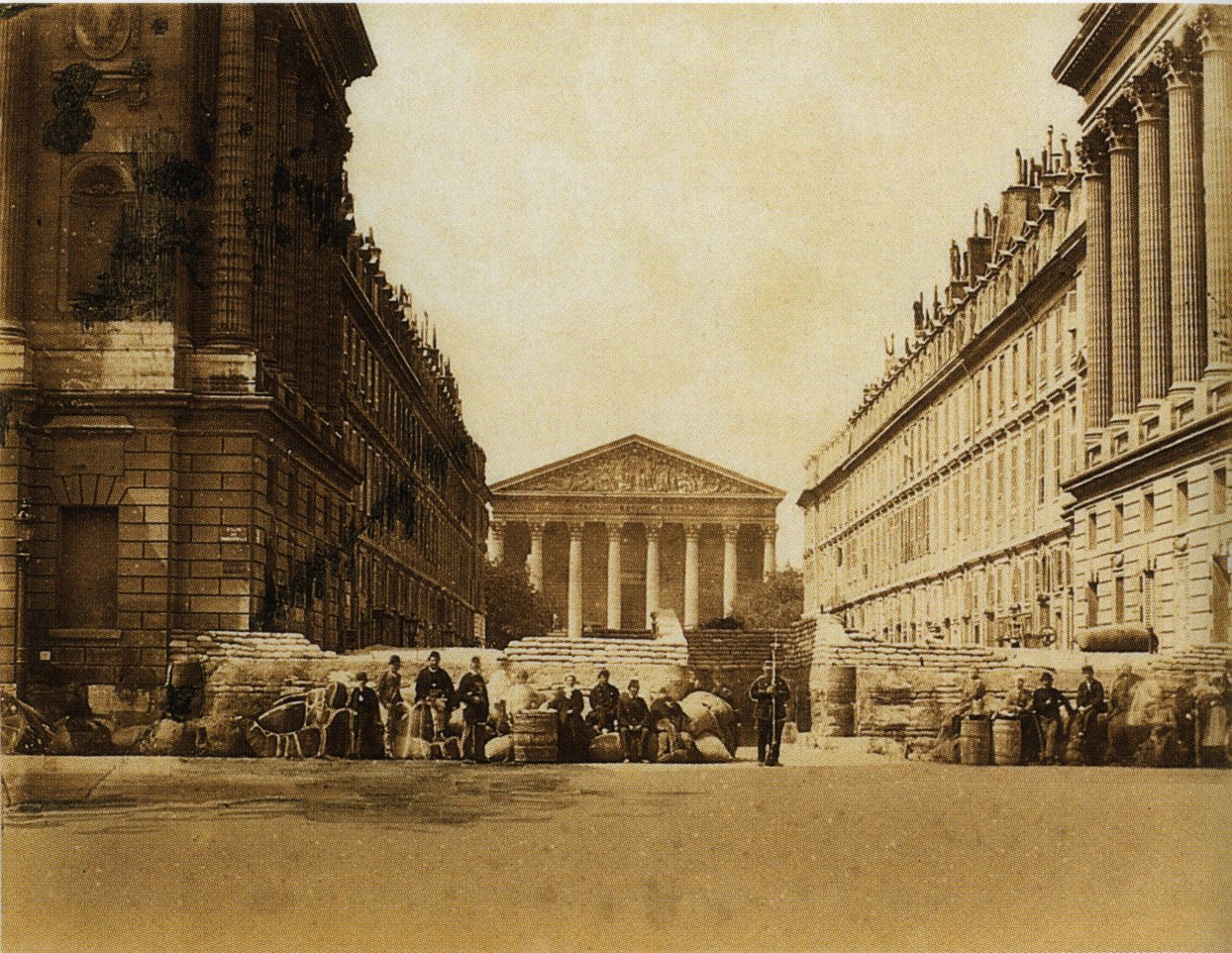
Barricade in front of la Madeleine

The insurrection began on 18 March 1871. After that date, Lemel was very active in the women's clubs where she often made speeches. These speeches helped to create, with Elisabeth Dmitrieff (a protégée of Karl Marx), the Women's Union for the Defense of Paris and Care of the Wounded, on 11 April, of which she became a member of the central committee.

On 26 March, following the elections, a revolutionary council was put in place, which counted people such as Jules Vallès, Charles Delescluzes, Raoul Rigault, Gustave Flourens, and Eugène Varlin. The city of Paris was going to be governed by the Commune until the Bloody Week (Semaine sanglante) when, on 21 May, Versailles troops entered the city; this week ended on the 28th, with the final battle at the Père Lachaise cemetery. During this period, Nathalie Lemel was on the side of the barricades next to la place Blanche (on rue Pigalle). On top of her fighting against the police, she also cared for the wounded.

After the defeat of the Commune, the War Council condemned her to deportation and exile in the Nouvelle-Calédonie penal colony. She embarked on board the Virginie, on the same convoy as Henri Rochefort and Louise Michel. Nathalie Lemel and Louise Michel were strongly opposed to separating the women at the deportation site. Nevertheless, they arrived five days after the men, on 14 December 1873, on the peninsula Ducos, where they ended up sharing the same cell; it is possible that she had a certain influence on her cellmate. She had to wait for the amnesty in 1880, enacted by President Félix Faure, before returning to Paris. She was later employed by the newspaper L'Intransigeant and continued her fight for women's rights.

== Death and legacy ==
She died in 1921 in the hospice of Ivry-sur-Seine, in Val-de-Marne. In 2007, a previously anonymous square in the 3rd arrondissement of Paris was named in honour of Nathalie Lemel on International Women's Day (8 March) by decision of the arrondissement council. The place Nathalie Lemel, at the junction of the rue Dupetit-Thouars and the rue de la Corderie, is the site of the former headquarters of the International Workingmen's Association (the First International). Lemel herself lived nearby, in a road then called impasse Béranger.

There are also rues Nathalie Lemel in Brest and Quimper and street artists Guy Denning and Shoof painted a mural to celebrate her in the Pontanézen quarter of Brest.
