= Elisabeth Dmitrieff =

Russian revolutionary and feminist activist

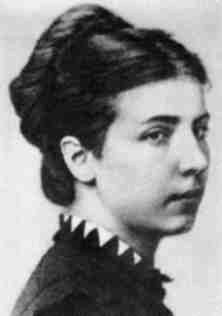
- Elisabeth Dmitrieff photographed by Alphonse Liébert in 1871
- Born: Elizaveta Lukinichna Kusheleva; 1 November 1850; Volok, Kholmsky Uyezd, Pskov Governorate, Russian Empire
- Died: 1916–1918 (?)
- Other name: Elizaveta Tomanovskaya
- Occupation: Revolutionary
- Known for: Participation in the Paris Commune

Elisabeth Dmitrieff (born Elizaveta Lukinichna Kusheleva, Russian: Елизавета Лукинична Кушелева, also known as Elizaveta Tomanovskaya; 1 November 1850 – probably between 1916 and 1918) was a Russian revolutionary and feminist activist. The illegitimate daughter of a Russian aristocrat and a German nurse, she had a comfortable upbringing but was marginalized within the Russian aristocracy due to the circumstances of her birth, leading to her interest in Marxism and the radical ideas of Nikolay Chernyshevsky. She entered into a marriage of convenience with Mikhail Tomanovski, a colonel who had retired early due to illness, in order to access her inheritance, which she used to fund revolutionary causes such as the Russian-language journal Narodnoye delo. Her money and married status allowed her to leave Russia and study in Geneva, where she participated in founding the Geneva section of the International Workingmen's Association. Sent by the Geneva section as an envoy to London, she became close to Karl Marx and his daughter Jenny.

When the revolutionary Paris Commune was declared following the French defeat in the Franco-Prussian War, Marx sent Dmitrieff to Paris as a representative of the International. There, she became one of the most important women's leaders of the Commune, founding the Women's Union to Defend Paris and Care for the Wounded, which demanded rights for working women and organized co-operative textile workshops in the city. During "bloody week", when French government forces retook the city, Dmitrieff fought and was wounded in defense of the Commune. She and Leó Frankel, whom she had worked with during the Commune and rescued in the fighting, hid in Paris for several weeks before escaping to Geneva.

Depressed by the defeat of the Commune and the failure of other revolutionaries to come to its aid, she returned to Russia in October 1871. There, she struggled to re-enter activist politics, since the radical circles of the 1870s were less sympathetic to her feminist socialism than those of the 1860s, and because she was forced to hide her communard past due to being pursued by the French, Swiss, and Russian police. She fell in love with the manager of her aging first husband's estate, Ivan Mikhailovich Davydovski, and had two children with him after she was widowed in 1873. Davydovski would become a key defendant in a sensational mass trial, accused of being a ringleader of the "Jacks of Hearts" criminal conspiracy, and was convicted for fraud and murder. Dmitrieff married him to follow him into exile in Siberia. She passed the last years of her life in obscurity, and the date of her death is uncertain.

Although historiography of the Paris Commune has tended to focus on Louise Michel, Dmitrieff's life has inspired a number of biographies. A public square carries her name in Paris, and a museum is dedicated to her in Volok, her village of birth, where she is remembered as a heroine of the revolutionary movement.

== Childhood ==
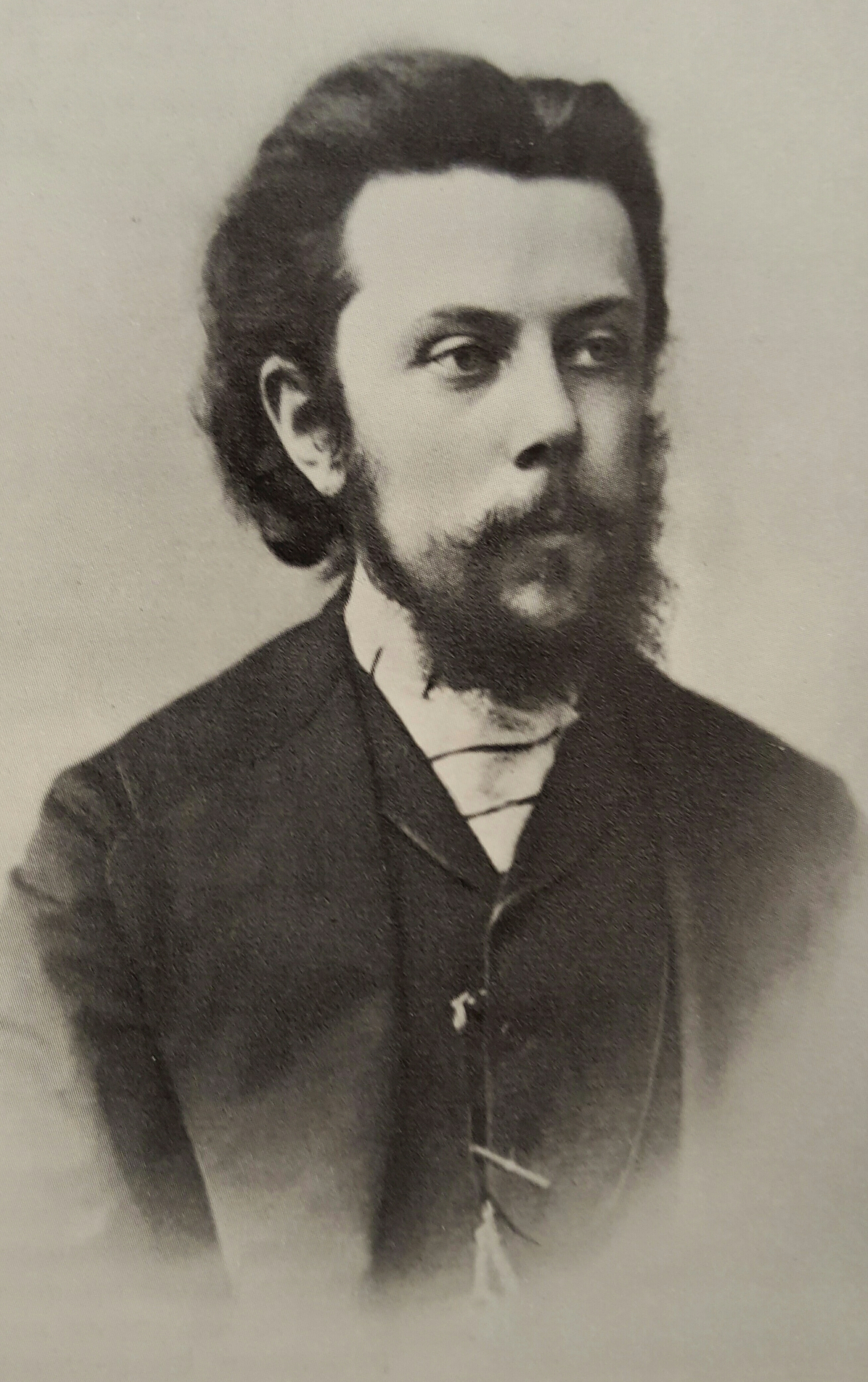
Modest Mussorgsky, one of Dmitrieff's teachers, in 1865

Elizaveta Lukinichna Kusheleva was born 1 November 1850, in Volok, a village in Toropets in the Pskov Governorate. Her father was Luka Ivanovich Kushelev (28 October 1793 - 1859) a pomeshchik (noble landowner) whose father, Ivan Ivanovich Kushelev, had been a senator under the reign of Paul I and active privy councillor under Alexander I. Kushelev received the education of a young aristocrat and joined the Cadet Corps, participating in the Napoleonic Wars. His first wife, Anna Dmitriyevna (born Bakhmetiyeva), was the illegitimate daughter of a nobleman and a maid; she was a rich heiress ennobled by the emperor. The couple fought often; Kushelev beat his wife and even kidnapped their three daughters, and despite an attempt at mediation the couple separated in 1832.

In 1848, Kushelev inherited the family estate after the death of his brother Nikolai. During his illness, Nikolai was treated by a 26 year old German Lutheran nurse, Carolina Dorothea Troskevich. Troskevich was part of the mechtchanstvo, the urban petty bourgeoisie, and came to Volok from Courland, where she had registered as sister of charity in the Lutheran evangelical order at Hasenpoth. She became Kushelev's mistress.

Dmitrieff was the third of four surviving children of Kushelev and Troskevich: elder siblings Sophia and Alexander and a younger brother, Vladimir. Kushelev, mindful of his status as an aristocrat, did not want to risk dispossessing the three daughters from his first marriage and refused to recognize Elisabeth and her siblings. Kushelev's first wife died of cholera, and he would eventually marry Troskevich in 1856, after she intervened to save him when his serfs revolted. He was 63; Troskevich was 35. She converted to Russian Orthodoxy and adopted the name Natalia Yegorovna.

Even after the three daughters from his first marriage had died, Kushelev did not legitimize the children of his second marriage. His will granted them the status of "wards", permitting inheritance of his fortune but not his noble title. The children were further marginalized in the Russian aristocracy by their mother's status as a foreigner. Her status as an illegitimate child and her rejection by the Russian aristocracy were probably the origin of Dmitrieff's sensitivity to inequalities, whether serfdom in the countryside or poverty in Saint Petersburg.

=== Education ===
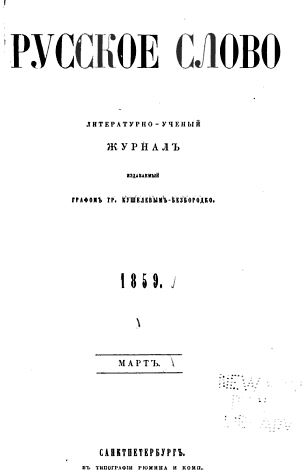
Dmitrieff read the magazine Russkoye Slovo (Русское слово).

Dmitrieff enjoyed privileges due to her father's position in the Russian aristocracy, but her combined status as both a bastard and a girl prevented her and her sister from enrolling in school, while their brothers faced no such impediment. However, she was educated by private tutors, among whom were veterans of the revolutions of 1848 and composer Modest Mussorgsky, possibly a distant cousin of Dmitrieff, who came to Volok in 1862 to treat his depression and spent his time with fellow artists of The Five.

Dmitrieff read works in English, German, and French from her father's library, as well as magazines her mother subscribed to. Dmitrieff's father possessed a library which gathered the new ideas of his time, and, paradoxically for an authoritarian man who was violent toward his serfs, he liked surrounding himself with people with progressive ideas. The Kushelevs often visited the Zielony estate, which frequently hosted radicals and other controversial figures, such as Nikolay Chernyshevsky. After Kushelev's death, Dmitrieff's mother continued to welcome revolutionary guests. The family spent summers at Volok, returning in the fall to Saint Petersburg, where they lived in No. 12 on Vasilyevsky Island, opposite the cadet corps where Kushelev, and then his sons, studied. In the house next door lived Sofya Kovalevskaya and Anne Jaclard, the latter whom Dmitrieff befriended. Additionally, this quarter housed privileged revolutionaries, notably including Dobrolyubov, Dostoevsky, Nechayev, Pisarev, Tkachev, Lavrov, and most importantly Chernyshevsky. Dmitrieff's younger brother frequently visited members of the first Land and Liberty. In 1863, Mussorgsky joined a Saint Petersburg community frequented by the writer Turgenev, the poet Shevchenko, and the historian Kostomarov, and Dmitrieff's mother brought her there. Dmitrieff drew close to student groups in favor of the emancipation of women and serfs.

Nikolay Chernyshevsky's novel What Is to Be Done? would become one of Dmitrieff's most important influences. In 1865, Aleksey Kuropatkin, a friend of her brother Alexander, brought it to discuss with him, but she was the one who took an avid interest in it. In the book, Nikolay Chernyshevsky proposes a radical questioning of social conventions and the prevailing way of life, notably marriage and inheritance. The novel recounts the story of Vera Pavlovna, a young emancipated woman who lives in a community with other young people and advocates a system of cooperatives to emancipate workers. She founds a cooperative of seamstresses, an urban obshchina, which serves as a model for similar initiatives throughout Russia. Chernyshevsky invites the reader to stop dreaming and start adopting the daily practices of an ideal socialist.

It was through this book and, probably, the magazine Russkoye Slovo, that Dmitrieff became interested in the ideas of Karl Marx. She was determined to build a bridge between Marx's economic theories and Chernyshevsky's ideas on the emancipatory capacity of the Russian village commune model. She had seen first-hand her father's notorious cruelty toward his serfs, and the families of the estate, serfs and lords, lived close to each other and were familiar with each other's living conditions. Dmitrieff developed through her reading a critical analysis of gender and class hierarchies, and envisaged using her fortune to construct a cooperative mill—an artel—which would serve the peasants of Volok.

Dmitrieff was determined to attend university, but women could not attend university at that time in Russia. Inspired by Vera Pavlovna in Chernyshevsky's novel, she decided to enter a marriage of convenience to emancipate herself from her family and obtain her inheritance. In 1867, she married the colonel Mikhail Tomanovski, who had been forced into retirement by an illness, and was an advocate for women's emancipation. After the marriage, she donated 50,000 rubles to revolutionary organizations.

== Early activism ==
=== Geneva: Narodnoye delo and the Workers' International ===
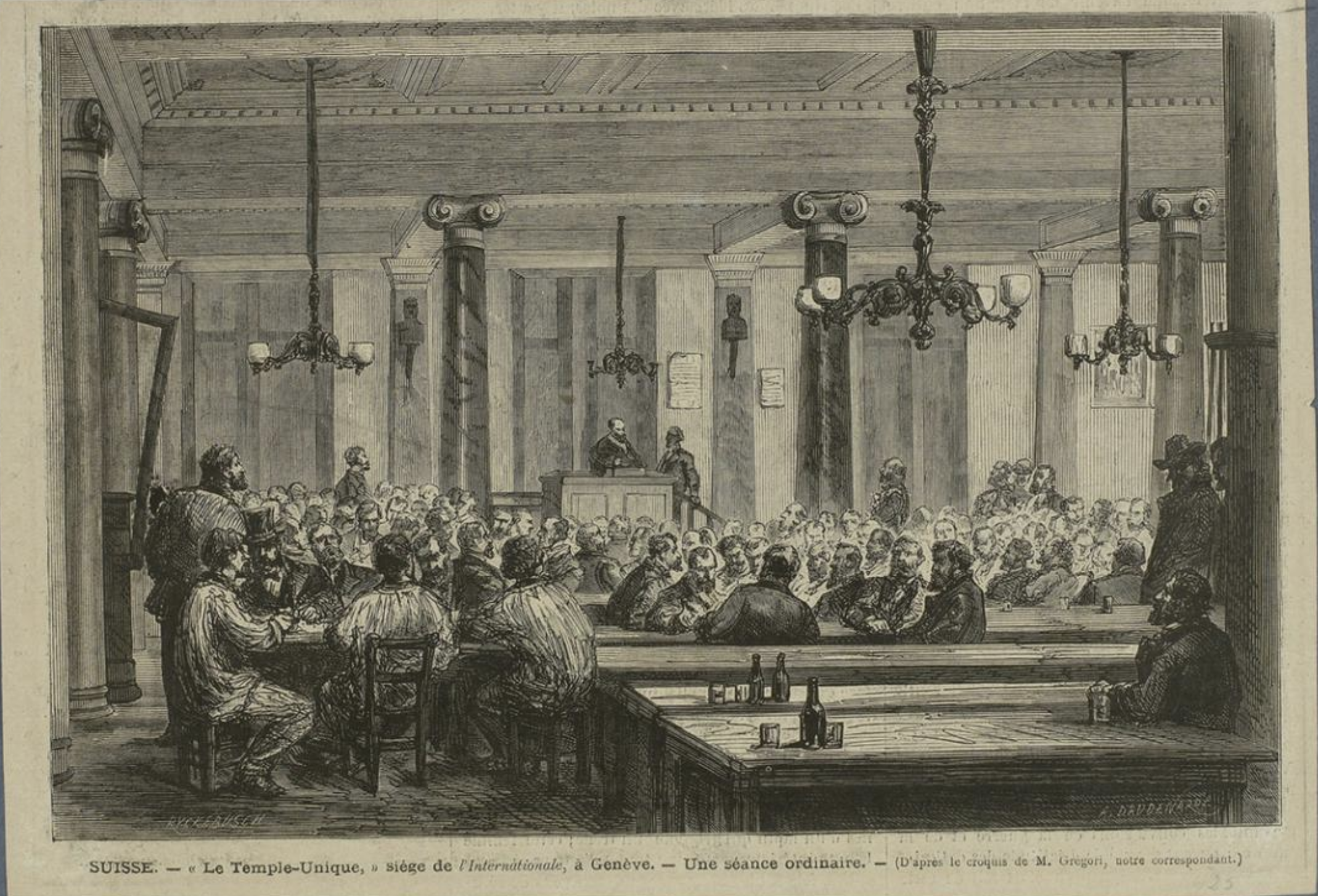
Session of the Geneva section of the International Workingmen's Association at the former Temple Unique in Geneva, between 1869 and 1875

Dmitrieff and her husband travelled around Europe, arriving in spring 1868 in Geneva, a popular destination for revolutionaries and Russian exiles. Here, she re-encountered Anne Jaclard and met Ekaterina and Victor Barteneva and Nikolai Utin, with whom she would become close friends. She eventually returned to Russia with her husband, then returned to Geneva in 1869 without him.

In the years that followed, she would no longer give any news to her family, and called herself "citizen Élise". She sometimes went to Basel and Zurich. In Geneva, meetings took place between the international socialist movements and the Russian revolutionaries. In that city, Dmitrieff met the French socialists Eugène Varlin and Benoît Malon, who, like her, would participate in the Paris Commune in 1871.

She financed and co-edited the Russian-language journal Narodnoye delo ("The Cause of the People"), which was founded in Geneva by Nikolai Utin and other exiled revolutionaries in 1868. The circle involved in the writing of the newspaper included Zoya Obolenskaya, Walery Mroczkowski, Victor and Ekaterina Barteneva, Nikolai and Natalia Utin, the publisher Mikhail Elpidin, and Olga Levashova (sister-in-law of Zhukovsky).

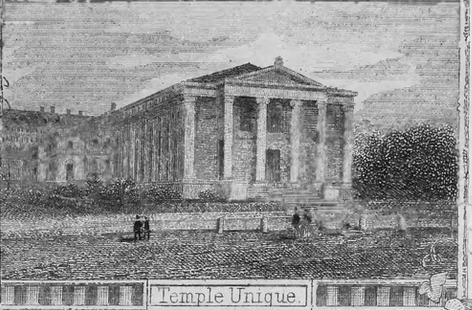
Geneva's Temple Unique around 1870, according to a postcard. The Geneva sessions of the International took place here.

Dmitrieff participated in the founding of the Russian section of the International Workingmen's Association—also known as the First International—with Nikolai Utin. She was equally involved in the "ladies' section", fighting for the emancipation of female workers.

The Geneva section of the International met in the former Temple Unique, a former Masonic temple, which would be bought in 1873 by the Catholic Church. Half of the founders of the Russian section of the International were emancipated women. The key figure in the organization, according to Peter Kropotkin, was Olga Levashova. She inspired him to dedicate his life to the revolution. Other founders include Natalia Geronimovna Korsini (who married Nikolai Utin and became Natalia Utin), Zoya Obolenskaya, Ekaterina Barteneva and Anne Jaclard. Elisabeth Dmitrieff was the last arrival and the youngest of the group. The Geneva section did not focus on women's roles and rights, but owing to the significant proportion of women in the section, and the strong influence of What Is to Be Done?, it had a relatively egalitarian atmosphere.

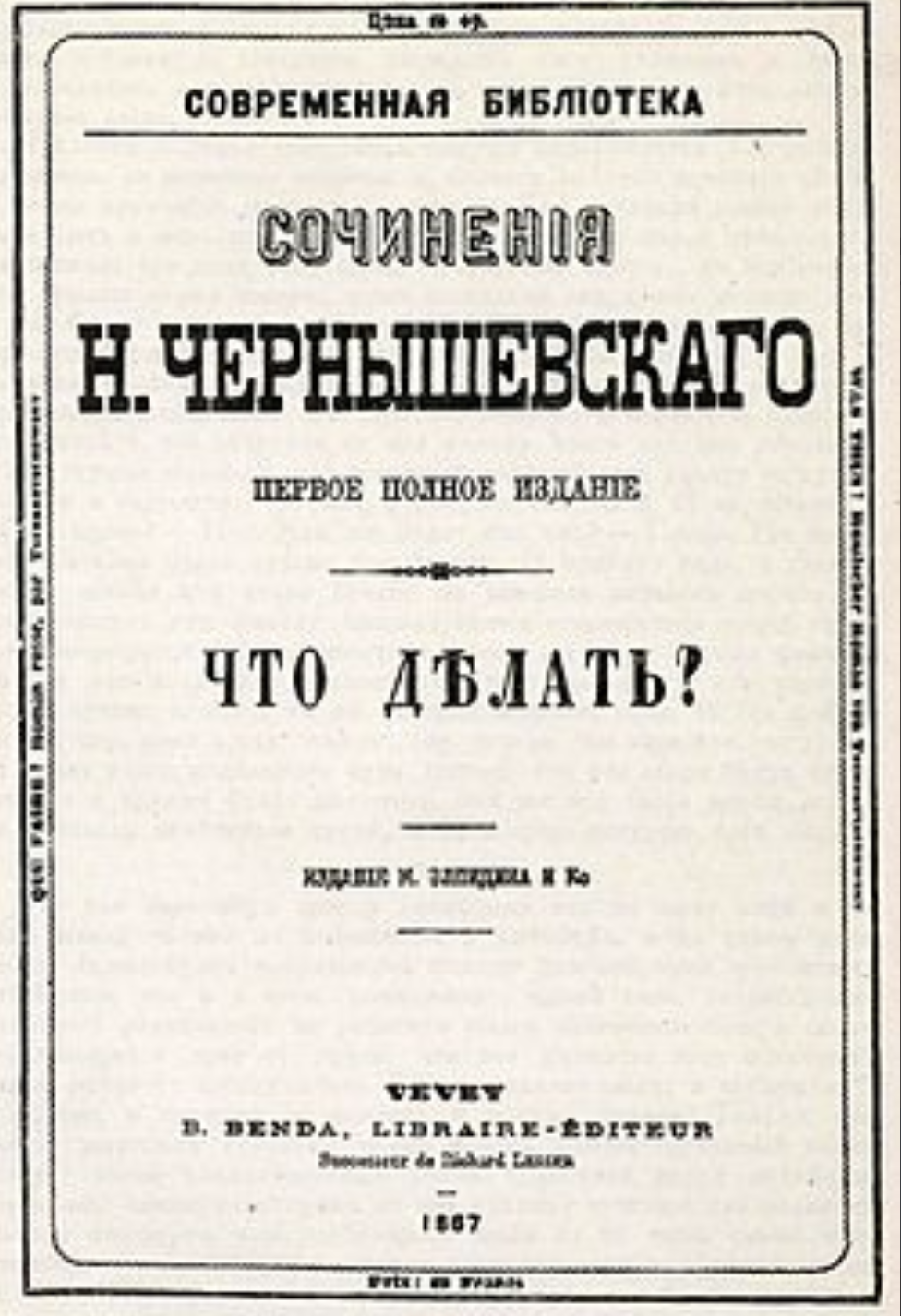
Cover page of the novel What Is to Be Done? by Nikolay Chernyshevsky, which had a major influence on Dmitrieff

=== London: meeting with Karl Marx ===
In November 1870, the Geneva internationalists sent Dmitrieff to London to ask Karl Marx to arbitrate their internal conflicts: Sergey Nechayev, who had arrived in Geneva in 1869 and was not popular in Russian revolutionary circles, had been welcomed with open arms by Bakunin, who at this time still sympathized with his methods. Nikolai Utin was suspicious of Nechayev and critical of Bakunin's ideas; he wanted to bring the Geneva section closer to Marx, in part to counter Bakunin's influence. Dmitrieff and Utin were good friends, and she followed his positions very loyally. Russian intelligence reported that an "Élise" stayed at Utin's place. He wrote her a letter of introduction to Karl Marx:

Dear citizen, allow us to recommend to you our best friend, Elisabeth Tomanovskaya, sincerely and profoundly devoted to the revolutionary cause in Russia. We will be happy, if through her we get to know you better, and if at the same time we could let you know in more detail the situation of our action, of which she will be able to tell you in depth...

She arrived in London at the end of 1870 and quickly became a family friend, building ties with both Karl Marx and his daughters. With Marx, she discussed traditional Russian rural organizations—the obshchina and the artel—as well as the ideas of Nikolay Chernyshevsky. She sent him prints of the newspaper Narodnoye delo, which she had sent from Geneva. Chernyshevsky thought that Russia could pass from the feudal to the socialist stage without transitioning through the capitalist stage of development, which he called the "theory of the omission". This would be achieved by revitalizing the communes under the model of Charles Fourier's phalanstère, while ridding them of their elements of patriarchal oppression. Dmitrieff had an influence on the ideas of Marx, who started to envisage the possibility of alternative and plural paths to socialism, without passing by the stage of capitalist development. These conversations continued with Vera Zasulich.

== The Paris Commune ==
The city of Paris had been besieged in the winter of 1870-1871, and its fall marked France's defeat in the Franco-Prussian War. On 18 March 1871, radicalized citizens and members of the National Guard refused to surrender control over the city to the Third Republic and instituted a revolutionary government, the Paris Commune. Many Commune politicians had hoped for a peaceful reconciliation with the Versailles government, but it soon became clear that France was in a state of civil war.

Karl Marx sent Dmitrieff on an information gathering mission to Paris as a representative of the International; Hermann Jung was supposed to go, but when he fell ill, Dmitrieff offered to take his place. She embarked on 27 March 1871 toward Calais. She abandoned her married name, Tomanovskaya, and took the nom de guerre Dmitrieff, inspired by the patronym of her paternal grandmother, Dmitrievna. She arrived in Paris on 28 or 29 March 1871, either the day of the official proclamation of the Commune or the day after. She joined Auguste Serraillier, also an activist of the International, who was in Paris to participate in the events. She also met with Russian socialist Pyotr Lavrov and sisters Sofya Kovalevskaya and Anne Jaclard, her neighbors in Saint Petersburg, who also participated in the Commune.

=== The Union des femmes ===
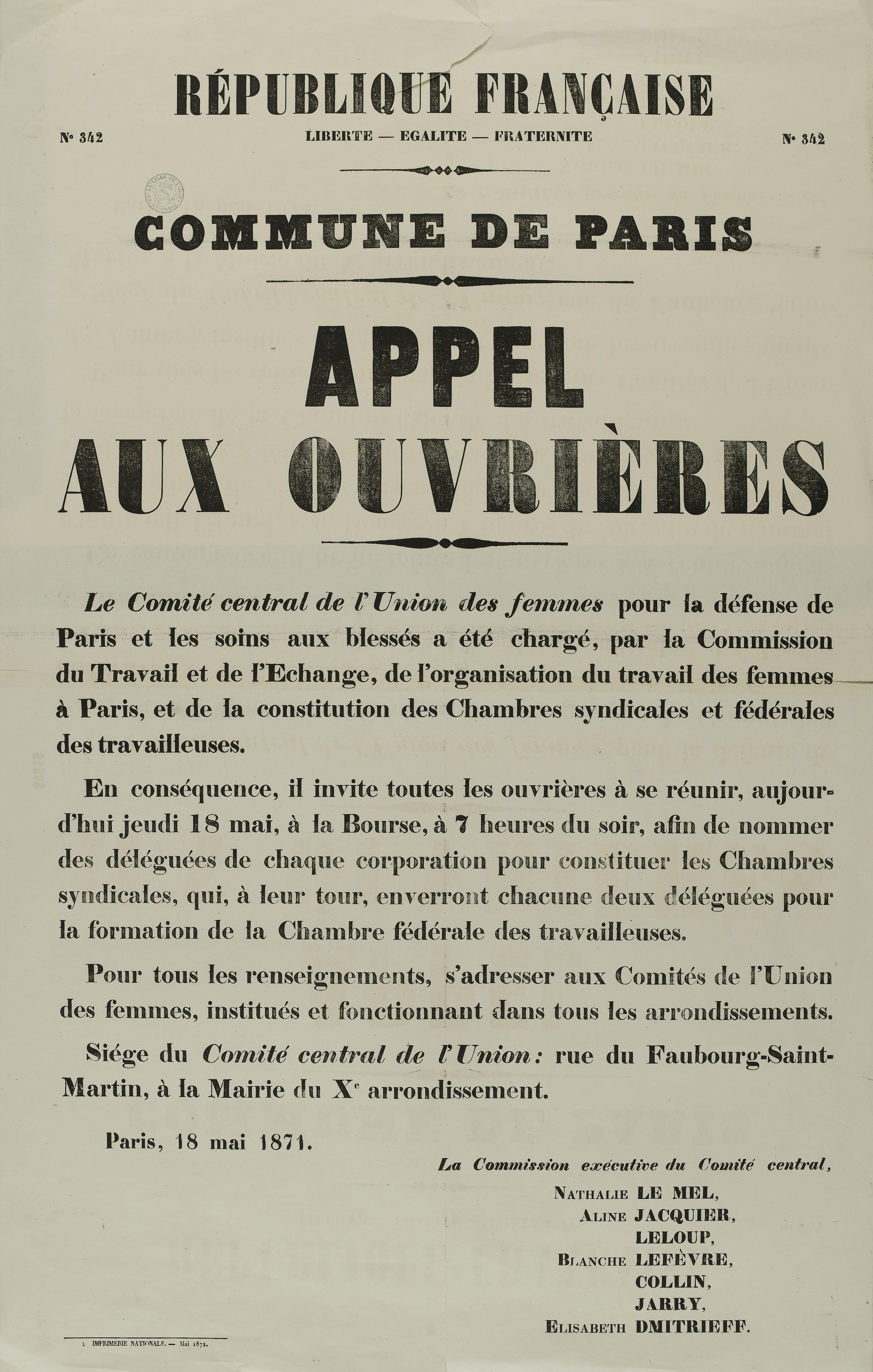
Paris Commune: "Call to Female Workers" of 18 May 1871, signed by Dmitrieff, among others

On 11 April 1871, she launched an "appeal to the female citizens of Paris" to encourage women to engage actively in the fight: "Female citizens of Paris, descendants of the women of the great revolution, we are going to defend and avenge our brothers, and if we have neither rifles nor bayonettes, we're still left with paving stones to crush the traitors." On the same day, in the Larched room (79 Temple Road) in the 10th arrondissement, Dmitrieff founded the Union des femmes pour la défense de Paris et les soins aux blessés ("Women's Union to Defend Paris and Care for the Wounded"). Dmitrieff, a member of the central committee, remained general secretary of the Union's executive committee, the only non-elected and non-revocable post of the organization. The executive committee also included Nathalie Lemel.

The main goal of the Union des femmes was to give women control over their own labor. Dmitrieff used her activist experience acquired during her trips to Switzerland and London to organize the Union. She obtained funding from the Commune's executive committee, in exchange for close supervision of the Union. The Union des femmes was the only organization to receive financial resources from the Paris Commune. Dmitrieff structured the organization in a hierarchical manner, with committees in each arrondissement, a central committee, an office, and an executive committee composed of seven members representing the districts. She organized the work of women in workshops in the traditional sectors of the clothing and textile industries, assuring them outlets thanks to the support of the Commune's executive committee, which she reported to regularly. She could not, however, avoid the competition of convents, prisons, or capitalist enterprises in the sector, who had a much lower-paid workforce, which caused friction. She busied herself above all with political questions, especially the organization of cooperative workshops. She thus found her opportunity to link Marxist theory with Chernyshevsky's practice, which concretized in the creation of workshops in the textile industry for seamstresses, laundresses, tailors, and drapers.

Dmitrieff partnered with Leó Frankel, an activist of Hungarian origin and a jewelry worker, who headed the Commune's Commission of Labor and Exchange. Together, the two attempted to advance the cause of women's rights in labor and social security, drafting a bill to organize the work of women in workshops, of which the text was published on 7 May 1871. It stipulated:

The goal of the Commune would be attained by the creation of special workshops for women's work and sales counters for the sale of fabricated products.

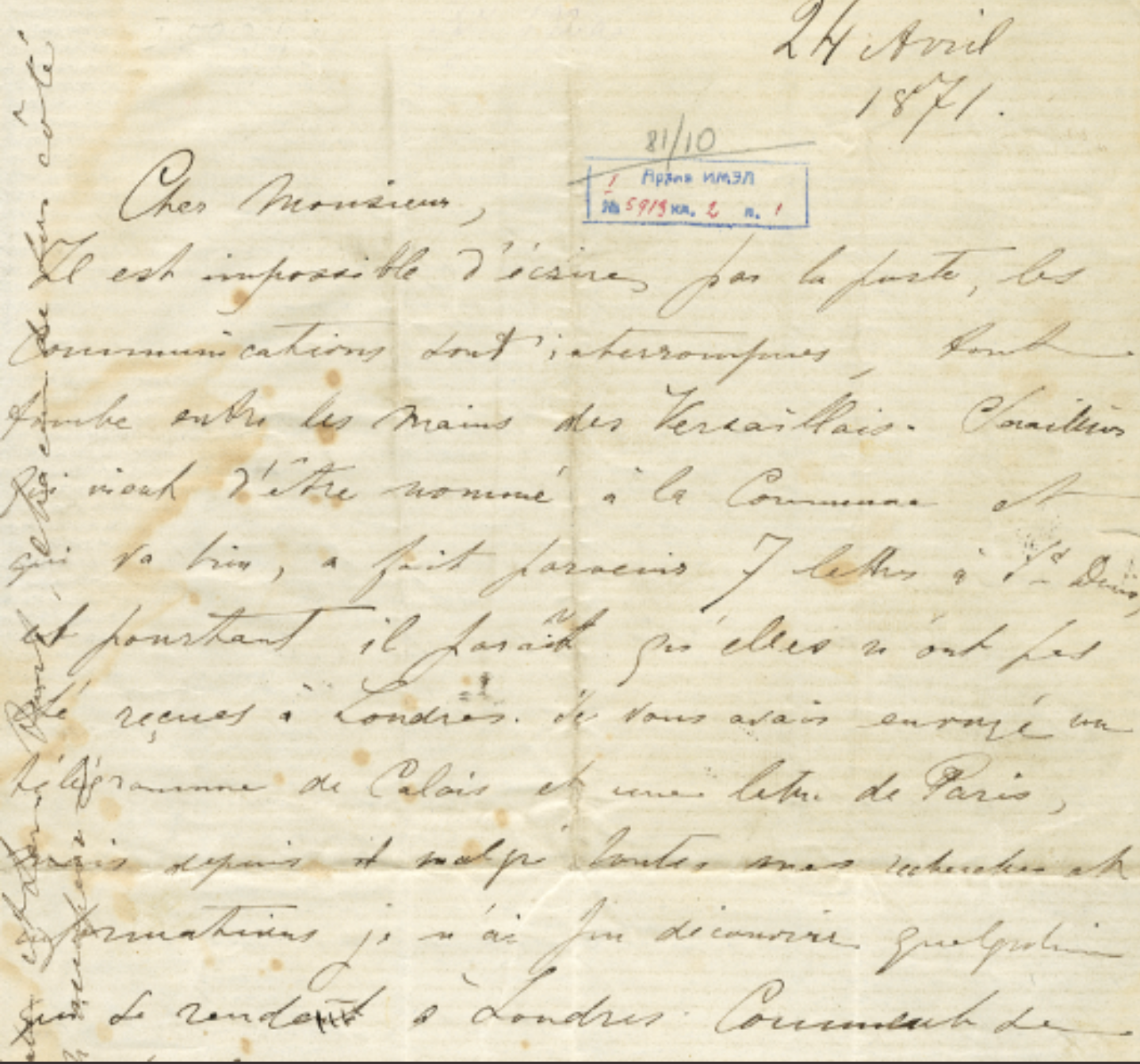
Letter sent by Dmitrieff on 24 April 1871 to Hermann Jung, possibly intended for Karl Marx

Relations were not always cordial between the Union des femmes and the Vigilance Committee of Montmartre. A certain poorly documented rivalry existed between the positions of André Léo and Anna Jaclard, and those of Dmitrieff. Both Léo and Jaclard were notably absent from the Union des femmes, even though Dmitrieff had befriended Jaclard in Russia, and remained in contact with her in Geneva before the Commune. Léo positioned herself against excessive interventionism, renouncing the use of violence. In contrast, Dmitrieff was resolutely interventionist. These tensions were made apparent in the formation of ambulance groups for the front. Léo announced in a statement the formation of an ambulance group in a certain quarter, which the Union des femmes was not previously aware of. Dmitrieff responded via a publication of the official newspaper that this ambulance group did not have the backing of the Union des femmes. Her status as a foreigner could equally have positioned the young Dmitrieff in rivalry with her Parisian elders.

Dmitrieff was less inclined to the "two spheres critique" (according to which there are natural differences between men and women). In addition, she defended actions that focused on class instead of gender differences. According to Carolyn Eichner, she "saw intergender, intraclass conflict as detrimental to all progress." Much of her work with the Union des femmes involved trying to break down the longstanding resistance to women's economic participation that was present in labor and socialist organization.

In April 1871, she wrote to Hermann Jung that she barely saw Benoît Malon and Leó Frankel because everyone was very busy, and that she was sick and tired but could not be replaced. Showing her pessimism, she asked why he would not get involved:

How can you stay there doing nothing, allowing Paris to perish? It's necessary to agitate the provinces at all costs, so that they come to our aid. The Parisian population (in part) is fighting heroically, but we never counted on being abandoned like this. However, up until now, we have been guarding all our positions, Dąbrowski is fighting well, and Paris is really revolutionary. We don't lack provisions. You know, I am pessimistic and don't see anything going well, so I expect to die one of these days on a barricade. (Note: French:Comment se peut-il que vous restiez là à ne rien faire, quand Paris va périr à cause de cela? Il faut agiter à tout prix la province, qu’elle vienne à notre secours. La population parisienne se bat héroïquement (en partie), mais on ne comptait jamais être abandonné comme cela. Pourtant, jusqu’à présent, nous gardons toutes nos positions, Dombrowski se bat bien et Paris est réellement révolutionnaire. Les vivres ne manquent pas. Vous savez, je suis pessimiste et ne vois rien en beau, je m’attends donc à mourir un de ces jours sur une barricade.)

Engels emphasized the concrete implementation of the phalanstère from What is to be Done? by the Union des femmes (sometimes presented as the first female section of the International), thus translating into reality the theses of both Marx and Chernyshevsky.

=== Semaine sanglante ===
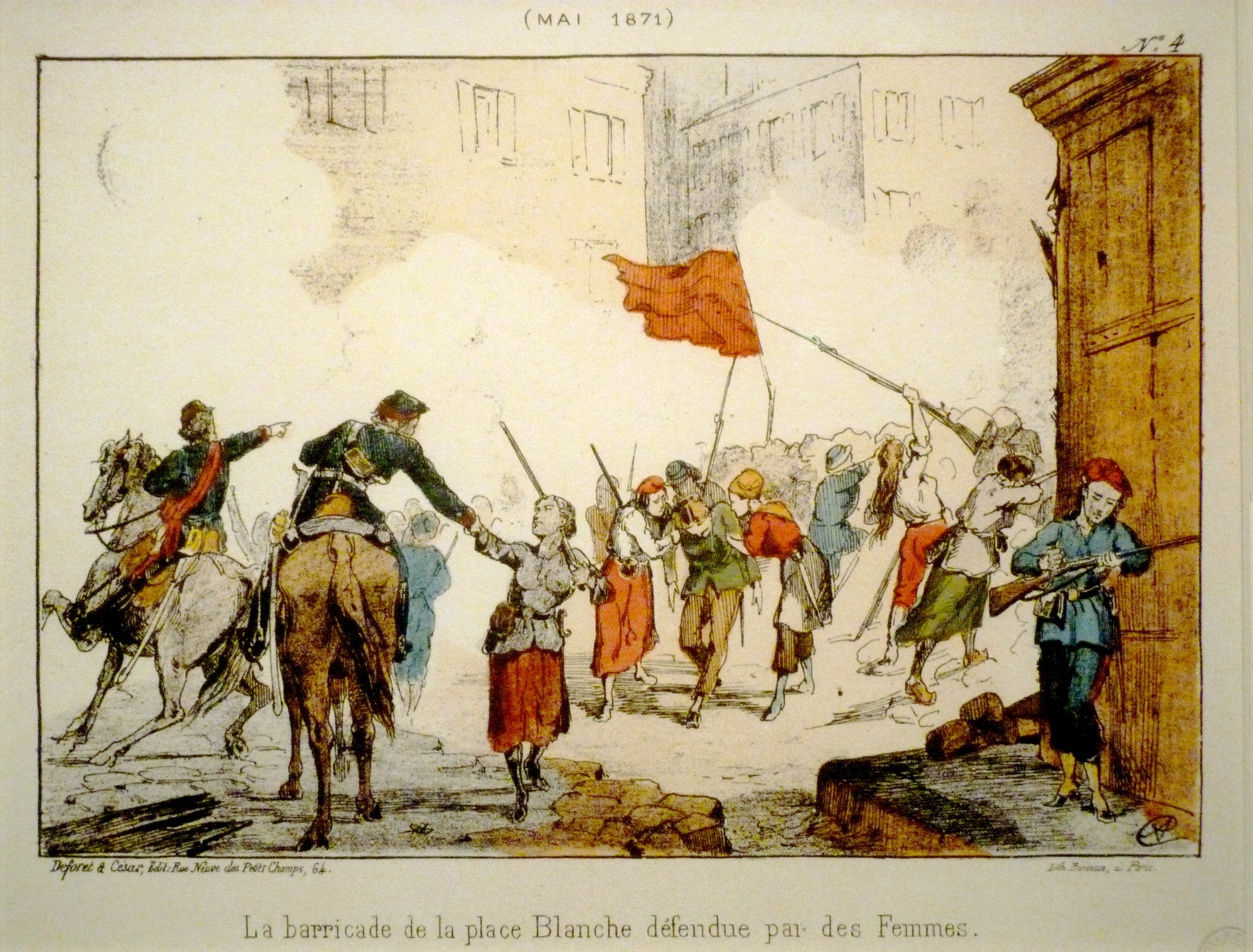
Barricade defended by women during semaine sanglante. Lithograph by Moloch. Musée Carnavalet, Paris.

Versailles troops entered Paris on 21 May. In one week, known as semaine sanglante ("bloody week"), they retook control of Paris for the Third Republic; the fighting ended, and the Commune fell, on 28 May. Around 22 May, the Union launched an appeal to fight for the "triumph of the Commune", and fifty women of the Union headed toward Montmartre.

Dmitrieff took part in the street fights on the barricades in Faubourg Saint-Antoine (11th-12th arrondissement), caring for the wounded, in particular Leó Frankel. Gustave Lefrançais mentioned in his memoirs her presence on 22 May at the entry of Rue Lepic (18th arrondissement), with a group of armed female citizens, which is confirmed by the counsellor of the Russian ambassador and by Colonel Gaillard, both anti-communards, the latter affirming that she was at the head of all the canteen workers, ambulance drivers and barricaders. The figure of 120 women appeared in an article on 24 May 1871, in the last issue of the Commune's official newspaper, published in Belleville. A barricade on Rue Blanche was mentioned in Le Rappel. This barricade would have been staffed only by women, but the facts concerning the role of women in the fighting are difficult to establish because in court, they denied having participated in combat in order to escape conviction.

== Dmitrieff after the Paris Commune ==
=== Return to Geneva ===
Both wounded in the fighting, Dmitrieff and Leó Frankel hid from the army in Paris for several weeks before escaping disguised as a bourgeois Prussian couple. When they reached Switzerland in June, Dmitrieff reconnected with her friends in the Geneva International, but she did not participate in politics there.

Hermann Jung mentioned her arrival in Geneva in a letter addressed to Karl Marx. Jung had received a letter from the general secretary of the Federation romande of the International, Henri Perret, who told Jung that Dmitrieff would write to him soon, and that she was safe. However, Dmitrieff would write neither to Marx nor Jung, possibly because she was resentful about how they did not come to Paris to support the Commune. She would stay in Geneva from June to October. At first, the refugees there felt relatively safe, but the arrest of the lieutenant colonel Eugène Razoua in Switzerland was worrying. On 23 July 1871, Perret wrote to Jung that Dmitrieff was threatened with arrest. On 1 July, France requested the extradition of Léo Frankel, and on the 12th, that of a woman by the name "Élise". The French foreign minister pushed the Swiss government to extradite every person who participated in the Commune, considering them criminals and not political figures. The Swiss government did not adopt this position; it freed Razoua and refused the extradition of former communards, in agreement with the rules of the right of asylum.

Unlike André Léo and Paule Mink, Dmitrieff stayed discreet about her communard past. She readopted her former name, Elisaveta Tomanovskaya, to complicate the police investigation. In this she was successful: the police were unable to determine her name, marital status, or even where she had lived in the Commune. A police report from May 1871 described her in these terms: "height 1.66 m; chestnut hair and eyebrows; slightly uncovered forehead; grey-blue eyes; well-shaped nose; medium-sized mouth; round chin; full face with slightly pale complexion; lively gait; usually dressed in black and always elegantly presented. Ultimately, she was charged with "incitement of civil war by encouraging citizens or inhabitants to arm themselves" and "provoking the assembly of insurgents by distributing orders or proclamations" and convicted in absentia on 26 October 1872 and sentenced to "deportation to a walled fortress."

=== Return to Russia ===
After several months in Geneva, she returned to Russia alone in October 1871, in "a state of extreme emotional depression". She reunited with her family and attempted to recover her health. She was very discreet, as she was still being searched for by French, Russian, and Swiss authorities. She returned to Saint Petersburg, where she did not find the same climate that had prevailed on Vasilyevsky Island when she was young. After the attempted assassination of Tsar Alexander II in 1866, a reactionary climate had descended, and the secret police were increasingly intent on tracking revolutionaries.

Dmitrieff had difficulty reintegrating herself with the radical community in Russia. The Narodnik movement and their strategy of "going to the people" now predominated in revolutionary circles. She was still involved with Narodnoye delo, but was dissatisfied with how feminism and education were sidelined in radical activism in the 1870s. She reunited with Ekaterina Barteneva, another former communard, with whom she planned to join a Narodnik commune outside Moscow, but they ultimately decided against it.

She wrote to Nikolai Utin: "I'm suffocating in Russia."

=== Marriage to Ivan Davydovski ===
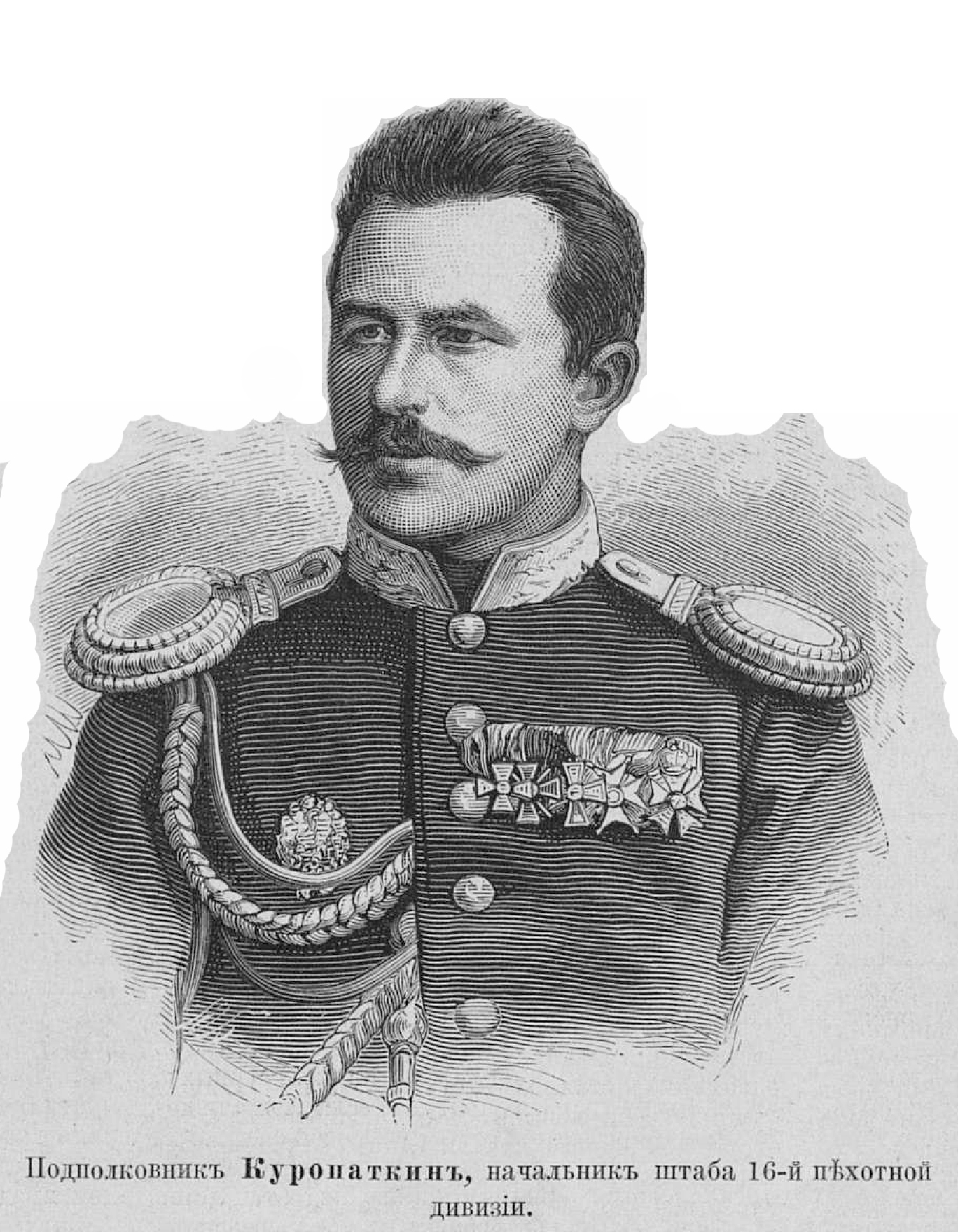
Aleksey Kuropatkin knew Dmitrieff as a child, and met her again in 1872, when she attempted to enroll him in a plot to overthrow the Tsar.

Dmitrieff left Saint Petersburg and, in 1871, met Ivan Mikhailovich Davydovski, steward of her husband's estate and a friend of her older brother, Alexander. She fell in love with him, and the first of their two daughters was born only a few weeks after the death of her first husband, Mikhail Nikolayevitch Tomanovski, of tuberculosis in 1873. From him she inherited a large sum of money, all of which she spent. She then abandoned all subversive activity to concentrate on her daughters, Irina and Vera.

In 1876, Davydovski was arrested, accused of embezzlement and fraud. He was also charged with instigating and providing the weapon for the murder of Collegiate Councilor Sergei Slavyshensky, who was shot to death by his lover, Ekaterina Bashkirova, in December 1871. Davydovski became one of the key defendants in the "Jacks of Hearts" case, a mass trial of con-men, swindlers, and forgers, many of whom came from respectable or even noble backgrounds, who were charged with being part of a criminal conspiracy. Although it was being tried as a criminal case, not a political one, Dmitrieff argued that Davydovski was targeted as a conspirator for political reasons, and mobilized her old friends, notably Ekaterina Barteneva and her husband Victor, who wrote to Nikolai Utin. On 17 December 1876, Utin wrote to Karl Marx, who helped find a lawyer, V. M. Tomashevsky, who was willing to defend Davydovski pro bono as though he were a political defendant. Carolyn J. Eichner highlights the paternalism of Dmitrieff's male socialist friends, who treated her like a lost child.

Dmitrieff testified during the trial:

I met Ivan Mikhailovich in October 1871; my first husband, the colonel Tomanovski, was then dying. Gentlemen of the jury, I would like to start with one thing: I've had enough of hearing that I'm a poor woman. I'm not really a poor woman. I like my husband and I married him in spite of all the calumnies raining down on him.

Davydovski was convicted and deported to Siberia, first to 8 years of penal labor, then "simple" exile and the revocation of his civil rights in perpetuity. While Dmitrieff had referred to him as her husband earlier, including during the trial, they were not yet formally married; when he was briefly released to house arrest in 1877, she legally married him in order to follow him into exile.

=== Exile in Siberia ===
Dmitrieff and Davydovski lived for a time in Nazarovo, then in Iemelianovo, and from 1898 to 1902 at Krasnoyarsk. They bought a cake shop in Achinsk and tried to contact the political exiles of the region. However, the political exiles did not appreciate the "common criminal" Davydovski, and Dmitrieff could not bring proof of her involvement in the Paris Commune, which she had hidden for fear of arrest. She was still being sought by the French police until the general amnesty of 1879, the news of which would never reach her. Boycotted and ignored by the overly poor local population, their enterprise went bankrupt. In 1881, she tried to contact Mikhail Sazhin, who she had known in Geneva and Paris, when he was temporarily held in Krasnoyarsk during his deportation to Siberia, to no avail. Sazhin was apparently aware of her unsuccessful attempt.

At Krasnoyarsk, she was involved in the local branch of the Red Cross and did a study on the carbon reserves at Nazarovo.

The end of her life is very poorly known. She wrote to the authorities to request pardon for her husband, who launched himself into the mining industry and encountered new setbacks. She thus decided to leave him. While Anton Chekhov was passing by Krasnoyarsk during his return from exile in Sakhalin Oblast, she asked him if he could point her to a place to stay in Saint Petersburg. Chekhov telegraphed his wife Olga Knipper, and Dmitrieff left for Saint Petersburg without her daughters, passing by Omsk, Tomsk, and Novosibirsk. On 21 September 1899, Olga Knipper wrote to her husband to confirm that Dmitrieff had arrived and was grateful for his help.

Aleksey Kuropatkin attests to having seen her again in 1898 or 1899, while he was Ministry of War of the Russian Empire, and on this occasion, she asked him to support her request for the pardon of her husband. Between this episode and the day of her mother's funeral, little is known about her life; one of the few mentions is by her niece, also named Elisabeth, who visited her in Moscow when Dmitrieff and her daughters moved there in 1902. Dmitrieff's brother Vladimir refused to say the name of her second husband, and no longer wanted to see her. Their quarrel concerned the inheritance of the Kushelevs. On the other hand, he maintained business relations with Ivan Davydovski until 1902, a fact attested to by promissory notes archived at Krasnoyarsk.

One of the last events where her presence is attested is in November 1903, according to the testimony of Ekaterina V. Gount, who was then a 9-year-old child. Gount lived on the Kushelev estate, where her parents were employed, and which was managed by Dmitrieff's brother, Vladimir Lukich Kushelev. She saw Dmitrieff, then 52 years old, arriving for her mother's burial ceremony. That night, a heated argument broke out between her and her brother, and she left very early the next morning by horse.

Her exact date of death is unknown. Braibant reports that her name and address are listed in Vsya Moskva for 1916. Knizhnik-Vetrov searched for records of her from 1918 in Saint Petersburg, Moscow, and Krasnoyarsk; he found nothing, and guessed from this that her date of death was likely to have been 1918.

== Legacy and posterity ==
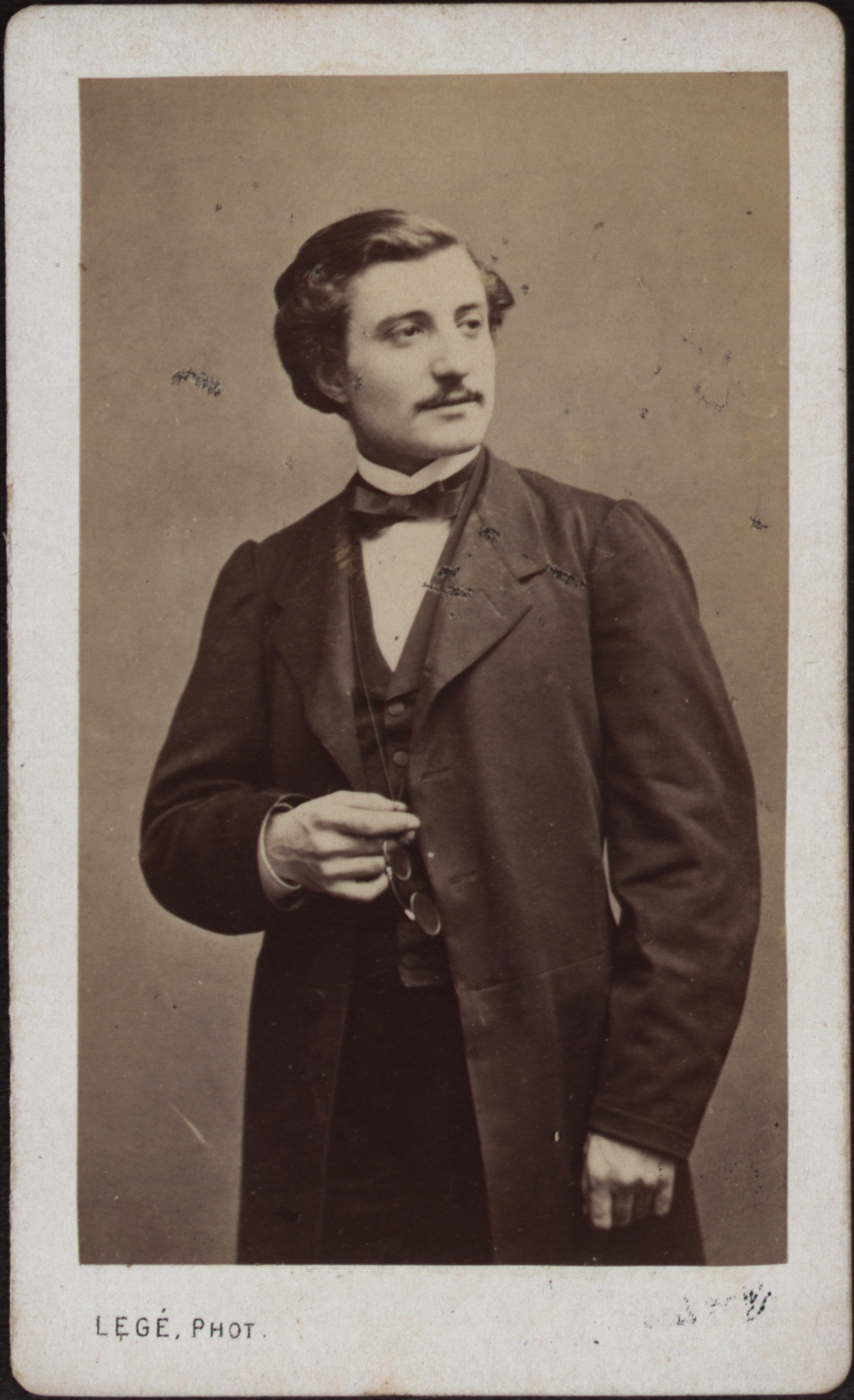
Prosper-Olivier Lissagaray, who wrote a history of the Commune in which he praised Dmitrieff

The history of the communards Paule Mink, Victoire Léodile Béra, and Elisabeth Dmitrieff is, according to Carolyn J. Eichner, characteristic of the invisibility of revolutionary women. The historiography of the Paris Commune is very divided after 1871 between the pro-communards, who only mention them briefly, and the anti-communards, who describe them as "pétroleuses", monstrous and arsonous women. Their history is even sometimes left out of the history of feminism, for the reason that the communards would not have described themselves as such. However, in the path these women followed, there exist dimensions of gender and class criticism which we find in the feminist socialists of which they were the precursors.

Despite the lack of historical attention paid to Dmitrieff and other communardes, there are many positive descriptions of her from her contemporaries, among them Arthur Arnould, Gustave Lefrançais, Benoît Malon, and Prosper-Olivier Lissagaray. Lissagaray idealized her, comparing her to Theroigne de Mericourt.

=== Russian biographers ===
Russian biographers that have studied Dmitrieff's life include Ivan Knizhnik-Vetrov, Nata Efremova and Nikolai Ivanov, and Lev Kokin.

The Russian historian Ivan Knizhnik-Vetrov, a Jewish convert to Catholicism and an anarchist close to Peter Kropotkin, first came across mention of Elisabeth Dmitrieff in the works of Bakuninist anarchist Mikhail Petrovich Sazhin. His first article about her was published in the Annals of Marxism in 1928, supported by David Riazanov. Riazanov was arrested in 1931, and in 1935 Stalin signed a decree banning Knizhnik-Vetrov from publication and ordering his works to be destroyed. Knizhnik-Vetrov then undertook a doctoral thesis with the same theme at Herzen University in Leningrad, submitting in 1945 with the title A Russian Activist in the Paris Commune. In 1947, he was deported to Siberia, and all copies of his thesis but one were destroyed in 1949. He was rehabilitated and admitted to the Academy of Sciences in 1955, and finally published his work ten years later.

Nata Efremova was a specialist in Russian revolutionary and pioneer women of the 19th century. She wrote biographies for the magazine Soviet woman until 1991 (for example on Sofya Kovalevskaya, Ekaterina Fleischitz, Nadezhda Suslova). On her involvement with Davydovski and the Jacks of Hearts, she declared that revolutionary women are too involved to succeed in their emotional lives, because—according to her—they have too much personality.

Lev Kokin, who published Chas Budushchego about Dmitrieff in 1984, focused almost entirely on her earlier life, and considered the last 40 years of Dmitrieff's life barely worth being recounted.

These three biographies have been compared by Dmitrieff's French biographer Sylvie Braibant, who uses a recurring vignette of Dmitrieff in 1899 to contrast their approaches and interpretations. In the vignette, Dmitrieff, still in exile in Siberia, sits on a chair and looks up at the stars. Knizhnik-Vetrov interprets it as an expression of religiosity; Efremova as an interest in astronomical science; Kokin as evidence of her decline.

=== In Russia ===
Dmitrieff's birth village, Volok, situated 200 km from Novgorod, is different today from the city she knew, but "the inhabitants honor the memory of their compatriot": (Note: Russian: Но местные жители чтут память о своей землячке.) the school has borne her name since 1965, and a commemorative plaque is dedicated to her at the House of Culture. During the 100th anniversary of the Commune, the Dmitrieva museum was inaugurated there. It is attached to the museum of K. Marx and F. Engels, whose fonds and collections were transferred to the Russian Center for Conservation and Study of Documents in Contemporary History in 1993. In Russia, Dmitrieff is a symbol of heroism and of the working class, considered by the encyclopedia Мой Красноярск as "one of the most brilliant women of the Russian revolutionary movement, and of the world". (Note: Russian: С историей города связано имя одной из самых ярких женщин мирового и российского революционного движения Елизаветы Лукиничны Дмитриевой-Томановской.)

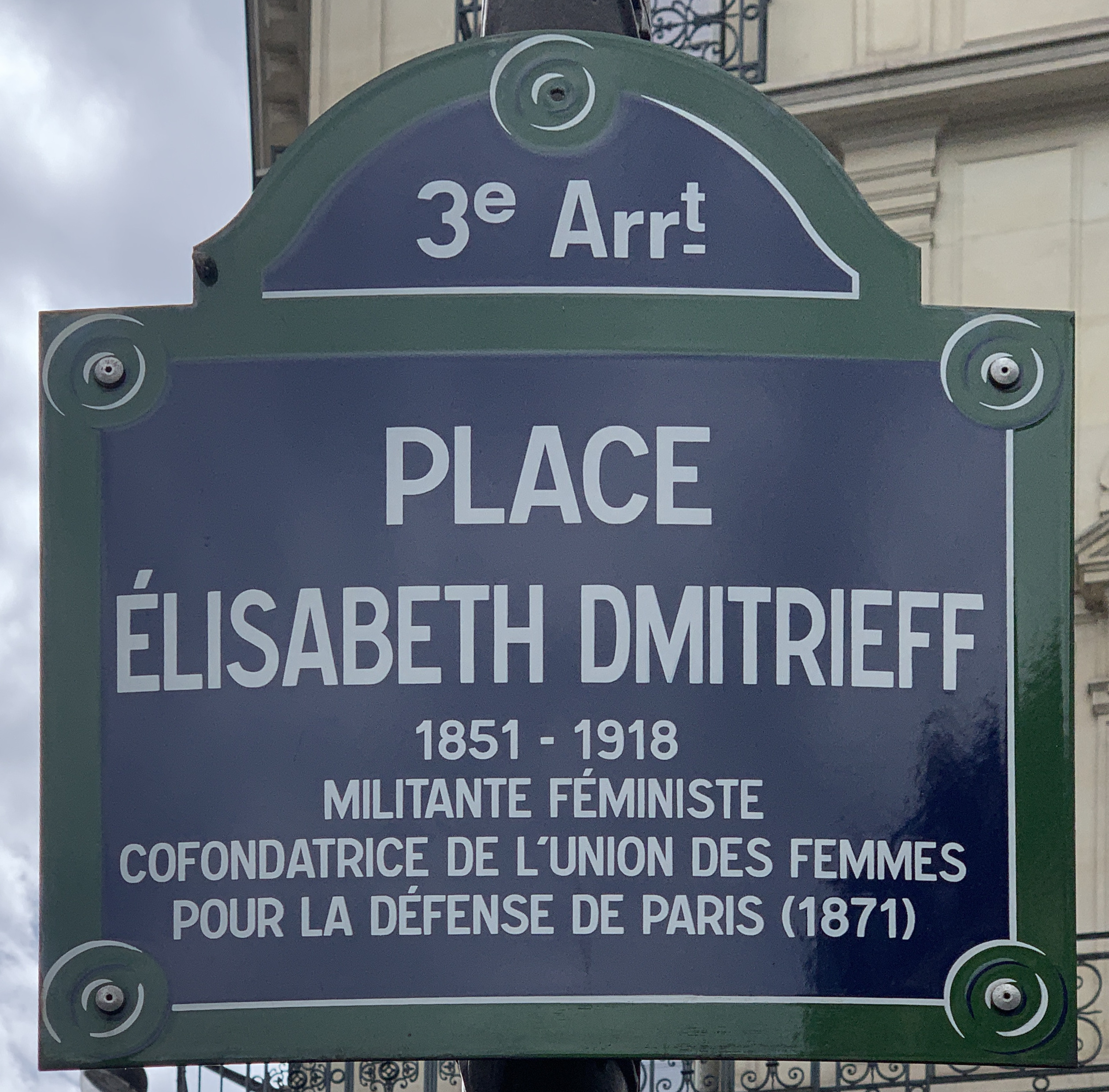
Plaque at Place Élisabeth Dmitrieff in Paris, in the 3rd arrondissement

=== In France ===
Dmitrieff has been the subject of two French-language biographies, Yvonne Singer-Lecocq's Rouge Elisabeth in 1977, and Sylvie Braibant's Elisabeth Dmitrieff: aristocrate & pétroleuse in 1993. However, she continued to be relatively unknown in popular culture until the twenty-first century, when she was featured as a character in novels by Catherine Clément (Aimons-nous les uns les autres, 2014) and Michael Löwy and Olivier Besancenot (Marx à Paris, 1871: Le Cahier bleu de Jenny, 2021). She has also been the subject of an issue of a comics series on the Commune, and a movement in a jazz production.

There is a street named after Elisabeth Dmitrieff in Saint-Étienne-du-Rouvray. In Paris, a square, Place Élisabeth Dmitrieff, was named after her in 2007. It is a small median strip containing the Temple metro station, at the intersection of Temple Road and Turbigo Road in the 3rd arrondissement of Paris. Michèle Audin, a specialist in the history of the Commune, has questioned the reasons that led to the name choice and the choice of text on the plaque, saying that the word "feminist" is an anachronism, and observing that the sign fails to even mention the Commune. In the 1970s, a group of feminists associated with the Mouvement de libération des femmes named themselves the "Cercle Élisabeth-Dimitrieff" in her memory, although at the time they knew little about her other than that Marx had sent her to the Commune in 1871.

== See also ==
- Paris Commune
- Pétroleuses
- Union des femmes pour la défense de Paris et les soins aux blessés

== Bibliography ==
=== Biographies ===
- "DMITRIEFF Élisabeth (TOMANOVSKAÏA dite)". Le Maitron Dictionnaire Biographique (in French). Paris: Maitron/Editions de l'Atelier. 2009.
- Braibant, Sylvie (1993). Élisabeth Dmitrieff : aristocrate et pétroleuse. Belfond. ISBN 2-7144-2963-7. OCLC 28516706.
- Bürgi, Markus (1 June 2012). "Dmitrieff, Elisabeth". Historisches Lexikon der Schweiz (HLS) (in German).
- Efremova, Nata; Ivanov, Nikolai Nikolaevich (1982). Russkaia soratnitsa Marksa (in Russian). Moscow: Moskovsky rabochy.
- Ivan Sergueïevitch Knizhnik (pseud. Vetrov et Knizhnik-Vetrov), Jeunesse et Enfance d'Elisaviéta Dmitrieva, Marx, Moscou, 1930.
- Knizhnik-Vetrov, Ivan Sergeevich (1964). Русские деятельницы Первого Интернационала и Парижской коммуны : Е.Л. Дмитриева, А.В. Жаклар, Е.Г. Бартенева [Russian Activists of the First International and the Paris Commune: E.L. Dmitrieva, A.V. Jaclard, E.G. Barteneva] (in Russian). Moscow: Nauka. OCLC 18605029.
- Kokin, Lev Mikhailovich (1984). Час будущего: Повесть о Елизавете Дмитриевой Chas Budushchego: Povest o Elizavete Dmitriyevoy (in Russian). Moscow: Politicheskaia literatura.
- Singer-Lecocq, Yvonne (1977). Rouge Élisabeth. Stock. ISBN 2234006104. OCLC 876475210.

=== Other works ===
- "Elisabeth Dmitrieff, l'autre cheffe de file des femmes de la Commune de Paris". TV5MONDE (in French). 24 December 2014.
- Antonov, Sergei (February 2018). "Russian Capitalism on Trial: The Case of the Jacks of Hearts". Law and History Review. 36 (1): 35–76. doi:10.1017/S0738248017000517. ISSN 0738-2480. S2CID 149321656.
- Bantigny, Ludivine (2021). La Commune au présent : Une correspondance par-delà le temps. La Découverte. ISBN 978-2-348-06669-6. OCLC 1241123887.
- Bard, Christine; Chaperon, Sylvie (2017). Dictionnaire des féministes: France, XVIII^{e}-XXI^{e} siècle. Presses universitaires de France. ISBN 978-2-13-078720-4. OCLC 972902161.
- Candar, Gilles (4 March 2021). "Du nouveau sur la Commune de Paris à la veille de son cent-cinquantième anniversaire". Revue historique. 697 (697): 223–236. doi:10.3917/rhis.211.0223. ISSN 0035-3264. S2CID 233813653.
- Dalotel, Alain (1997). "La barricade des femmes". La barricade. Éditions de la Sorbonne. pp. 341–355. ISBN 978-2-85944-851-6.
- Nata (Natalia) Pavlovna Efremova (1987). Dotch' Revolioutsionnoï Rossii (in Russian). Moscou: Moskovskii Rabotchii.
- Eichner, Carolyn J. (2020). Franchir les barricades: Les Femmes dans la Commune de Paris. Éditions de la Sorbonne. ISBN 979-10-351-0522-8. OCLC 1149074370.
- Eichner, Carolyn J. (1998). "'To Assure the Reign of Work and Justice': The 'Union des Femmes' and the Paris Commune of 1871". Österreichische Zeitschrift für Geschichtswissenschaften. 9 (4): 525–555. doi:10.25365/oezg-1998-9-4-5. ISSN 2707-966X.
- Eichner, Carolyn J. (2004). Surmounting the Barricades: Women in the Paris Commune. Bloomington, IN: Indiana University Press. ISBN 0-253-34442-5.
- Gullickson, Gay L. (1996). Unruly women of Paris : images of the commune. Ithaca: Cornell University Press. ISBN 0-8014-3228-6. OCLC 34704995.
- Kovalevskaïa, S. V. (1978). A Russian childhood. Springer-Verlag. ISBN 0-387-90348-8. OCLC 4194495.
- Linton, Marisa (1997). "Les femmes et la Commune de Paris de 1871". Revue historique (in French) (603). Paris: Presses Universitaires de France: 23–48. doi:10.3917/rhis.g1997.603n2.0023. ISSN 0035-3264.
- McClellan, Woodford (1979). Revolutionary exiles : the Russians in the First International and the Paris Commune. Cass. ISBN 0-203-98802-7. OCLC 243606265.
- Ross, Kristin (2015). Communal Luxury: The Political Imaginary of the Paris Commune. Verso. ISBN 978-1-78168-839-7.
- Ross, Kristin; Dobenesque, Étienne (2015). L'Imaginaire de la Commune (in French). La Fabrique. ISBN 978-2-35872-064-9. OCLC 902796458.
- Schrupp, Antje (2018). "Bringing Together Feminism and Socialism in the First International: Four Examples". In Bensimon, Fabrice; Quentin, Deluermoz; Moisand, Jeanne (eds.). 'Arise Ye Wretched of the Earth': The First International in a Global Perspective. Brill. pp. 343–354. doi:10.1163/9789004335462_023. ISBN 978-90-04-33546-2. S2CID 200085929.
- Schulkind, Eugene (1985). "Socialist Women during the 1871 Paris Commune". Past & Present (106): 124–163. doi:10.1093/past/106.1.124. JSTOR 650641.
- Thomas, Édith (1963). Les Pétroleuses. La suite des temps. Éditions Gallimard. ISBN 2-0702-6262-6. Translated into English as The Women Incendiaries (1966) by James and Starr Atkinson.
