= Mikhail Stasyulevich =

Russian writer and publisher (1826–1911)

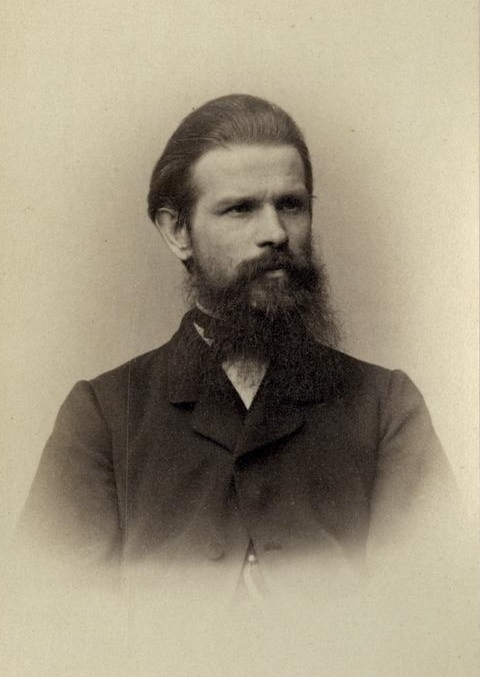
- Born: Mikhail Matveevich Stasyulevich; August 28, 1826; Saint Petersburg, Russian Empire
- Died: January 23, 1911 (aged 84); Saint Petersburg, Russian Empire

Mikhail Matveyevich Stasyulevich (Михаи́л Матве́евич Стасюле́вич, August 28, 1826, Saint Petersburg, Russia – January 23, 1911, Saint Petersburg, Russia) was a Russian writer, scholar, historian, journalist, editor and publisher. He is best known as the founder (in 1866) and editor-in-chief (1866–1909) of Vestnik Evropy ("Herald of Europe"), one of Russia's leading literary magazines of the time.

== Biography ==
Mikhail Stasyulevich was born in Saint Petersburg to the family of a doctor. He graduated from the Saint Petersburg University's Philology faculty in 1847. In 1852 he was invited to teach the children of the Russian monarch's family and in 1860-1862 was a personal history tutor for tsesarevich Nikolai Alexandrovich.

In 1856-59, Stasyulevich toured Europe, meeting many members of the Russian emigre community, such as the Utin family, who would later become heavily involved in revolutionary activity back in Russia, and Alexandr Herzen, the famous editor of Kolokol, a progressive paper that was illegal in Russia. He actively participated in the academic life of Western European universities, intending to bring the European modes of pedagogy to Saint Petersburg University. One of his fellow professors at the university, P.V. Ostrogorskii, described him as a "brilliant lecturer-popularizer" who "showed us for the first time history's significance and explained the profound meaning of civilization."

In April 1859, he married Liuba Utin, the daughter of a wealthy merchant, the sister of his colleague Boris Utin.

In 1861, in a time of student unrest in Saint Petersburg in response to repressive laws passed by the tsarist government, Stasyulevich and four Saint Petersburg University colleagues - Konstantin Kavelin, Alexander Pypin, Włodzimierz Spasowicz, and Boris Utin - attempted to reform the institution, but were unsuccessful. Two of Stasyulevich's brothers-in-law, Nikolai and Yevgeny Utin, were arrested in the student demonstrations of 26 and 27 September. Stasyulevich did not outright support the students, believing it would be counterproductive to do so, but when the authorities gave harsh penalties to the students and closed the university in the fall of 1861, he and his four reform-minded colleagues resigned in response.

Stasyulevich wanted to create a political space for moderate liberals - somewhere that could host criticism of the state as far as possible within the bounds of official censorship. For this purpose, in 1866 he founded Vestnik Evropy ("Herald of Europe"), naming it after a defunct journal founded by Nikolai Karamzin, a famous writer. To get approval from the Interior Ministry, Stasyulevich emphasized that this was primarily to be a historical journal, not a political one. To underscore the intent, he convinced Nikolai Kostomarov, a well-known historian, to join the editorial board. The journal was financially supported by the Gintsburg banking family, who were prominent Jewish philanthropists. Away from the eyes of government censors, Stasyulevich and his wife hosted a weekly salon for progressive intellectuals to debate the concerns of the day more openly than was allowed in print.

Although Herald was intended as a historical journal, Stasyulevich fought hard to attract literary talent, in order to drive subscription rates. In particular, he encouraged Ivan Goncharov's Precipice. The Herald was also important for launching Emile Zola's literary career. He also opened his own printing shop in November 1872, with the aim of printing the works of Russia's greatest writers at affordable prices. He printed 5000 copies of each volume.

He was also the author of numerous articles on contemporary Russian literature, and later literary memoirs (on Ivan Goncharov and Aleksey K. Tolstoy, among others).

His grave in the Voskresenskaya church was destroyed in the late 1920s, as well as the church itself. The first comprehensive study of his legacy, A Man of His Times, was written by Viktor Kelner and published in 1993.

== Selected works ==
- A History of the Middle Ages in Writings of the Time and Modern Day Studies / История средних веков в ее писателях и исследованиях новейших ученых (Vol. 1—3, Saint Petersburg, 1863—65)
- A Study in Review of the Philosophy of History's Basic Systems / Опыт исторического обзора главных систем философии истории (Saint Petersburg, 1866)

== Bibliography ==
- М. М. Стасюлевич и его современники в их переписке / M. M. Stasyulevich. Correspondence With the Contemporaries. Vols. 1—5, Saint Petersburg, 1911—1913.
- Kelner, Viktor. Человек своего времени / A man of His Times. Russian national Library. 1993. ISBN 5-7196-0949-0.
