= Group of Narodnik Socialists =

- Founded: March 1870
- Dissolved: September 1872
- Headquarters: Geneva
- Newspaper: People's Cause
- Ideology: Populism; Marxism; Agrarian socialism
- Political position: Left-wing
- International affiliation: International Workingmen's Association
- Movement: Narodniks

Group of Narodnik Socialists was a group of Russian revolutionary émigrés headed by Nikolai Utin, Anton Trusov, and Victor Bartenev. This group published the magazine Narodnoye Delo (People's Cause) in Geneva. At the beginning of 1870 it set up the Russian section of the International Workingmen's Association (First International). On March 22, 1870, the General Council of the International accepted the affiliation of the Russian section. At the section's request, Karl Marx undertook to serve as its representative on the General Council. "I gladly accept the honourable duty that you offer me, that of your representative on the General Council," wrote Marx on March 24, 1870, to the members of The Committee of the Russian section (Marx-Engels Ausgewahlte Briefe, M.-L. 1934, S. 234).

The members of the Russian section of the First International supported Marx in his struggle against the Bakuninist anarchists, propagated the revolutionary ideas of the International, did what they could to strengthen the ties between the Russian revolutionary movement and its Western-European counterpart, and took part in the working-class movements of Switzerland and the French Third Republic. However the members of the Russian section were not consistent Marxists; their views still contained much Narodnik utopianism; specifically they idealised the village community, calling it "a great achievement of the Russian people." The section failed to establish close ties with the revolutionary movement in Russia, which, according to Vladimir Lenin, was the main reason for its collapse in 1872.
