= Natalia Utina =

Russian revolutionary (1841–1913)

Natalia Ieronimov Utina
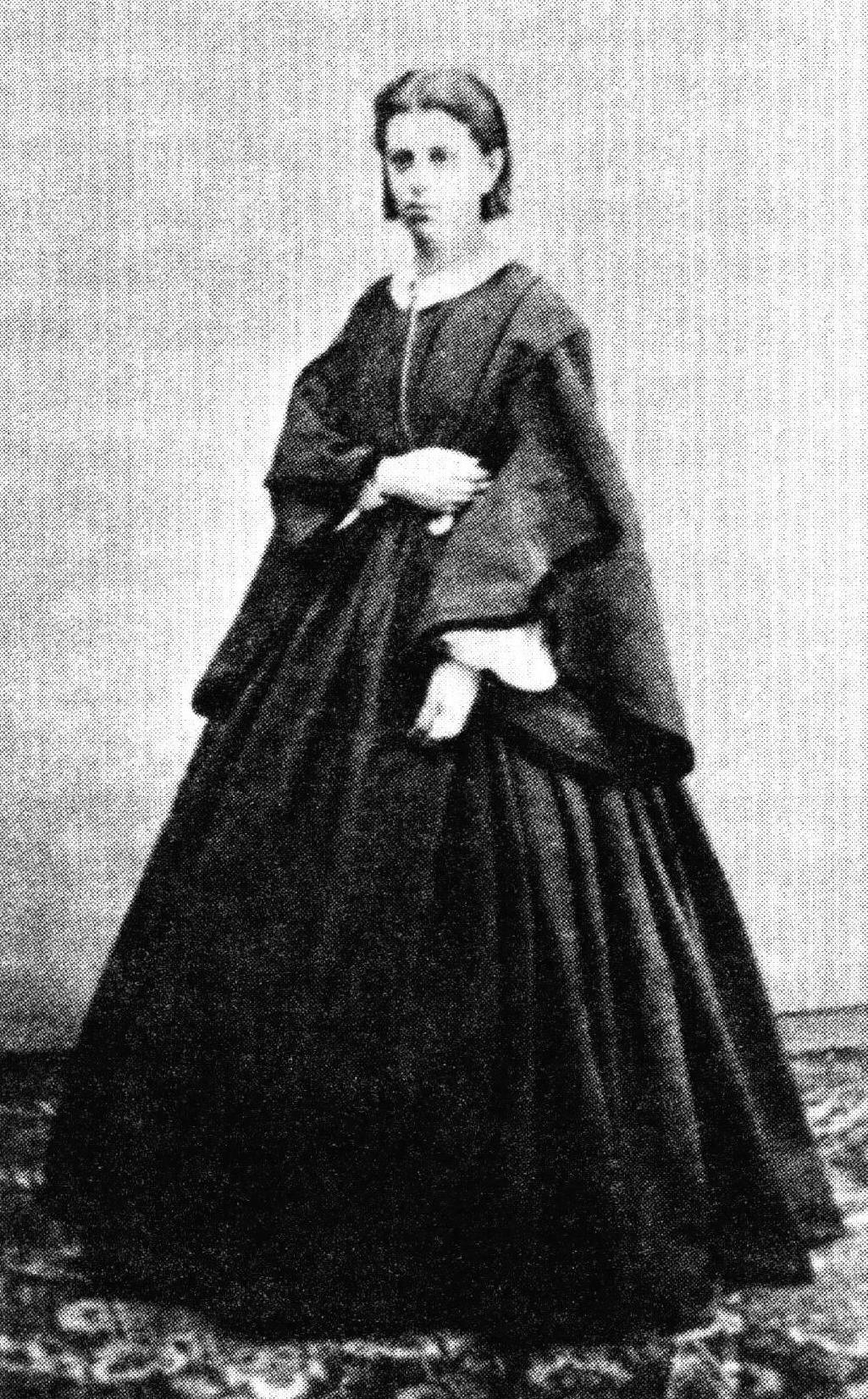
- Born: Natalia Ieronimovna Corsini; January 24, 1841; Saint-Petersborg Russian Empire
- Died: June 16, 1913 (aged 71); Saint Petersburg, Russian Empire
- Resting place: Novodevichy Cemetery (Saint Petersburg)
- Spouse: Nikolai Utin
- Relatives: Marija Antonowna Corsini, mother Geronimo Corsini., father

Natalia Ieronimovna Utina (born Natalia Ieronimovna Corsini, Russian: Наталья Иеронимовна Утина (Корсини); also known as Natalia Aleyeva; 24 January 1841 – 16 June 1913) was a Russian prosaist and dramaturge. She participated in the Russian revolutionary movement in the 1860s with her husband Nikolai Utin, and in the Russian section of the International Workingmen's Association in Geneva. They both repented and went back to Russia in 1878. She then became a writer, her story Life for Life published in 1885 gained notoriety and depicted the personal drama of Alexander Herzen.

== Biography ==
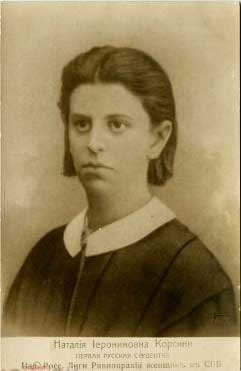
Natalia Korsini is known as the first female Russian university student.

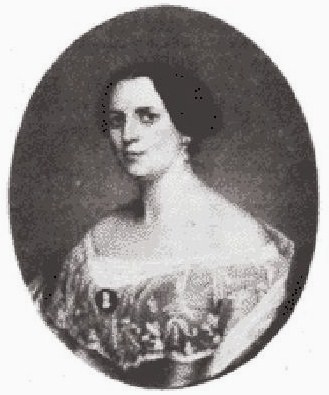
Marija Antonowna Corsini, Natalia Utina's mother was also a writer.

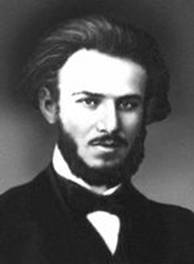
Nikolai Utin, Natalia Utina's husband

Natalia Ieronimovna Utina was born Corsini on 24 January 1841. Her parents were the writer Marija Antonowna Corsini and the architect Geronimo Corsini. She had two siblings, a brother and a sister. Her paternal grandfather was Italian painter Domenico Corsini.

Natalia Utina was the youngest child, and had a sister, Catherine, born in 1838 and a brother Paul (1839–1896). Her mother Marijy Corsini graduated from the Catherine Institute, and wrote in children's magazines. Her writings propagated moral Christian family values.

In the early 1860s Utina became one of the first female auditors at the Saint Petersburg Imperial University, studying law like her sister and brother. She attended lectures by Włodzimierz Spasowicz and Konstantin Kavelin, which, in her opinion, did not allow "to turn to the narrow path of myopic materialism". She also attended lectures by her future husband's brother.

Natalia Corsini was a member of the enlightenment circle of A. P. Blummer – V. V. Alexandrovskaya. The circle was devoted to teaching courses in Sunday schools for girls. She was a member of the Committee of the second branch of the Litfond Literature fund, established for the benefit of students. She was arrested following her participation in the students' speeches in 1862. That year she married Nikolai Utin. The ceremony took place in 1866 in the Geneva Orthodox Church. She participated in the Russian section of the 1st International in Geneva. In 1878 she returned with her husband to Russia.

In summer 1862 there was a wave of arrests among the leaders of Zemlya i volya (Land and Liberty), including Nikolay Chernyshevsky. Nikolai Utin took the leadership of the central committee and directed with Natalia Corsini the printing of the journal. When Utin received news that he was under close scrutiny of the tsarist secret police, he fled the country in May 1863 and Natalia Korsini followed him. The couple settled in Geneva, where there was a thriving community of young Russians revolutionaries.

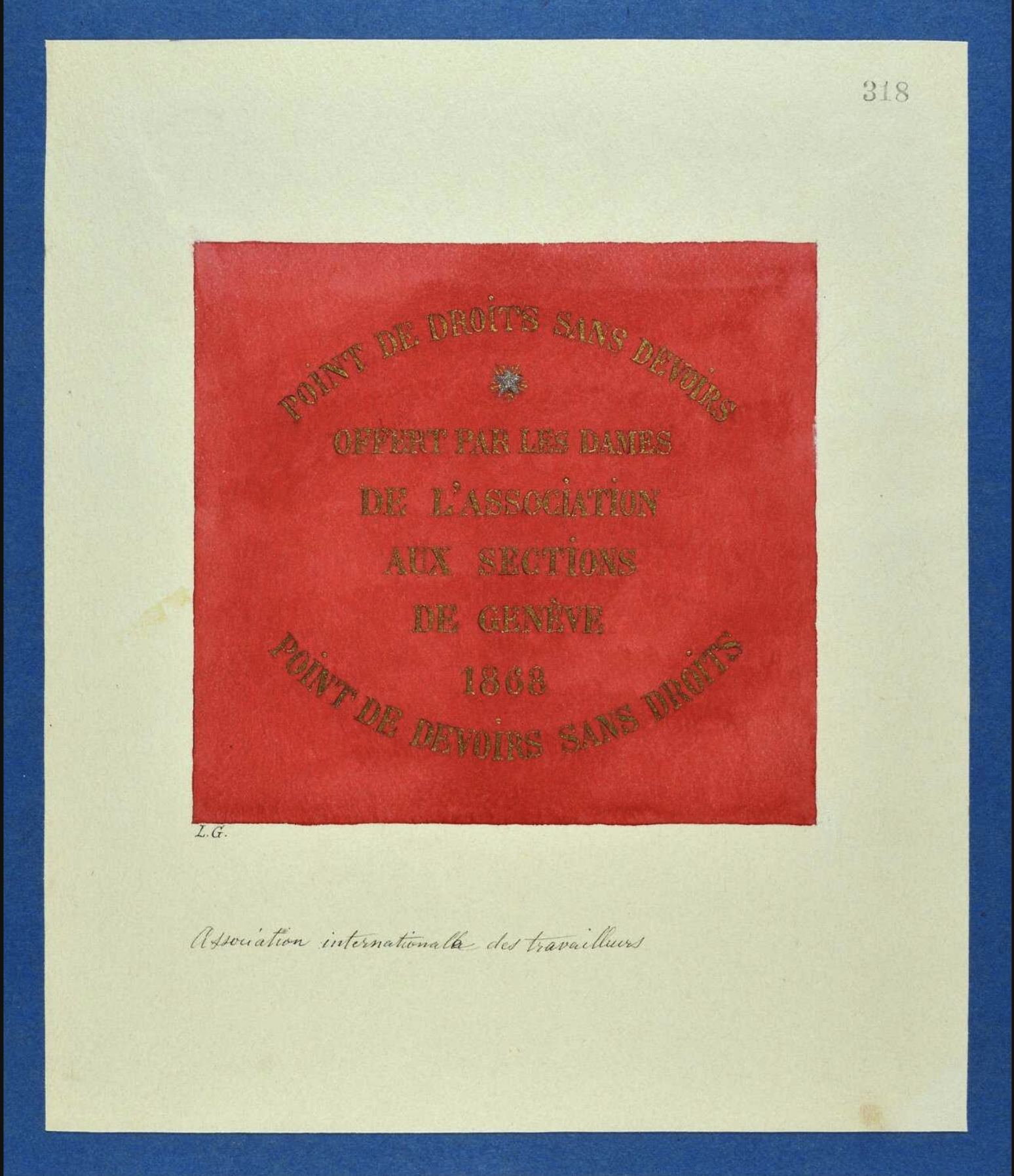
Flag of the International Workingmen's Association in Geneva, offered by the women section in 1868, with the words "No duties without rights, no rights without duties".

In Geneva she was part of Nicolas Utin team that took over the publication of Narodnoye Delo after the conflict between Utin and Bakunin and Zhukovski led to their resignation. They both took part in the foundation of the Russian section of the International Workingmen's Association. As Nikolai Utin was close to Nikolay Chernyshevsky, Alexandre Herzen, Karl Marx and Élisabeth Dmitrieff, Natalia got to know them too.

Her first publication was a review of Scottish Marriage and English Youth (1871). In her written work Natalia Utina tried to combine the storytelling of love affairs with more contemporary "life issues", which is reflected in her novel Two Worlds (published in 1874 and 1875 under the pseudonym N. Aleyeva). Two Worlds describes the lives of young people in the 1860s with a complex interweaving of numerous characters from different "worlds" (poor and rich, "new people" and philistines) and several story lines.

Natalia Utina tends to describe in a somewhat edulcorated tone the realities of her literary and family life. This is clear in the story Life for Life published in 1885 under the pseudonym N. A. Tal, where the personal drama of Alexander Herzen (in the story Herzen is Veprin, Nikolay Ogarev is Pogorelov, and Georg Herwegh is Stein) was pictured in a distorted way. The scandalous popularity of the story prompted T. P. Passeck Tatiana Passeck to publish Herzen's letters to Ogarev in the journal Russkaya starina (in Russian : Русская старина) 1886–1987.

In her story "Soul Storms" (1889) the heroine is disappointed with marriage, free love, and becomes a witness to the events of the revolution of 1871 in Paris, experienced by Natalia Utina herself. In the story “Krantz" (1892), the main character is a young doctor, a Jew, but described as "Christian at heart", who is presented as an example of an ideal man capable of sacrifice. The story is rich in Jewish symbolism, and was probably written in polemic with anti-Semites, although Natalia Utina could not avoid some anti-Semitic clichés. In 1913, plays on which Natalia Utina worked in the late 1880s were published: The Tsarevna Xenia, The Banker, and Ondine (1898–1899), written in collaboration with Pavel Viskovatov, who was the husband of her older sister.

After the death of her husband in 1883 she lived with her family in Dorpat where also became an amateur actress. She lived in misery. Answering a letter from M. K. Lemke inquiring about her husband's archives in 1912, she wrote back from Vyborg gubernia that there had been a fire in her estate, which destroyed the house and everything in it. Natalia Utina's last known letter, dated June 16, 1913, is to Lemke, telling him about her intention to remain in Finland until the end of her days.

== Other works ==
- Рецензия "Английские семейные хроники", 'Review of English Family Chronicles',1871.
- Роберт Бернс. Шотландский народный поэт, 'Robert Burns. Scottish Folk Poet', 1876.
- Людоедка, 'The Ogre', 1874.
- Перекатов, Perekatov, 1875.
- Современный Диоген, 'The Modern Diogenes', 1890.
- Тайна. Провинциальный комик. В Удельную, 'The Secret. A Provincial Comedian. To Udelnaya', 1913.

== Bibliography ==
- Шишкин, Михаил (2022-01-29). Русская Швейцария (in Russian). Litres. ISBN 978-5-457-17365-1..
- "Outine, Nicolas". hls-dhs-dss.ch (in French)..
- McClellan, Woodford (1979). Revolutionary exiles : the Russians in the First International and the Paris Commune. Cass. ISBN 0-203-98802-7. OCLC 243606265..
- "Корсини в Петербурге. Петербург: вы это знали? Личности, события, архитектура". culture.wikireading.ru (in Russian).
- Rykunina, Yulia A. (2019). Egorov, Boris F. (ed.). Russkie pisateli, 1800–1917: biograficheskiĭ slovarʹ [Russian writers, 1800–1917, a biographical dictionary]. Russkie pisateli 11-20 vv [Russian writers of the 11th–20th centuries] (in Russian). Vol. 6. Moscow: Great Russian Encyclopedia. pp. 393–394. ISBN 978-5-4469-1616-0. OCLC 21334760.
