= Mikhail Elpidin =

Russian publisher (1835–1908)

Mikhail Konstantinovich Elpidin (Михаил Константинович Элпидин, 1835–1908) was the Russian émigré publisher of Narodnoye delo, Obshcheye delo, and Obshchina.

Elpidin was born in Volga in 1835, the son of a priest. He went to Kazan University in the fall of 1860, but was arrested during the Bedzna unrest, and arrested again during the student demonstrations of 1861. He joined Land and Freedom, and was arrested yet again in April 1863. This time, he was sentenced to katorga. He escaped in July 1865 and fled to Geneva, where there was a lively Russian émigré community. He was given a friendly welcome by long-established émigrés like Alexander Herzen and Pyotr Dolgorukov, but a generational gap was opening between the "old guard" and the "young emigration", and Elpidin set up as a publisher in Geneva to rival Herzen's Kolokol. He printed the first issue of Narodnoye delo, but ceased his involvement after the departure of Bakunin.

What is to Be Done?, a novel by Nikolay Chernyshevsky that was much beloved by the young generation of Russian radicals, was first printed in book form by Elpidin. (It had initially been serialized in Sovremennik.) Elpidin's efforts to publish this and the rest of Chernyshevsky's collected works were mired in legal challenges, financial difficulties, and delayed production. Meanwhile, in 1868, he opened a reading room, then a bookshop, and in 1871 he opened a co-op restaurant with Nikolai Utin. While Elpidin struggled with the increasingly crowded exile printing scene, his bookshop in comparison became a tremendous success: it was an important centre for visiting émigrés (and the secret police who hunted them), and the only profitable Russian-language bookshop in Western Europe. After exiting the printing business, he assisted other printers with acquiring type and was business manager and publisher for other revolutionary ventures, among them Obshcheye delo (Common Cause).

Elpidin's contemporaries had mixed opinions of him, finding him uncouth and crude, a "maniac", and "absurd" (Herzen). But he was respected for his energy, his bookstore, and his business expertise, and even those who expressed dismay at his eccentricity or lack of intellectual cachet were willing to work with him. (Nikolai Utin, for example, called him an "idiot intriguer".) Politically, Elpidin was devoted to the revolution, but not programmatic; he believed that "any shame, any scandal, that could compromise the Tsarist regime is useful for the revolution." Overall, his views were more similar to Bakuninism than to the Marxism that was becoming popular among his generation of revolutionaries in Geneva.

In 1887, Elpidin became an informer for the Okhrana, the tsarist secret police. He was dismissed in 1900 owing to his "senility and uselessness". While earlier historians have not treated him kindly for this, more recent historians have theorized that Elpidin used his status to misdirect and misinform the Okhrana agents. In any case, he appears to have funnelled the money paid to him by the Okhrana into publishing revolutionary literature at an even greater rate than before.

Elpidin was especially active in publishing in the last decade of the 19th century, but by the time of his death in the first decade of the 20th, the pioneering publisher of the "young emigration" had himself been overshadowed by a new generation of radicals.

== See also ==
- History of Russia (1855–1894)
