= Olga Levashova =

Russian revolutionary (1837–1905)

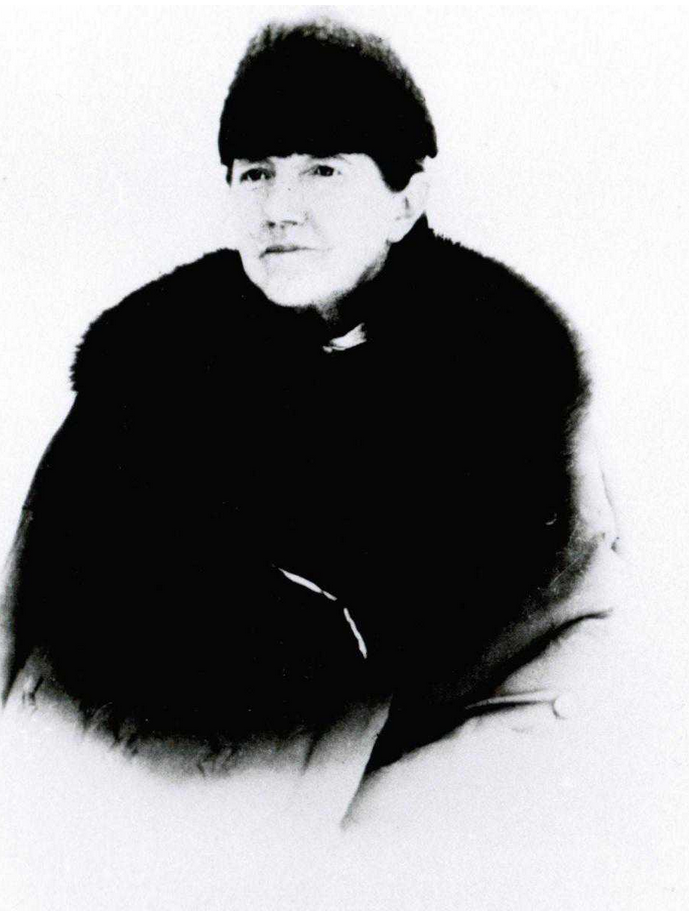

Olga Stepanovna Levashova (Russian: Ольга Степановна Левашова, née Зиновьева (Zinovyeva); 1837–1905) was a member of the Russian section of the International Workingmen's Association (IWMA) in Geneva, and financed the journal Narodnoye delo.

Levashova was active in the revolutionary Russian émigré community in Geneva. Nikolai Utin and Johann-Philipp Becker sponsored her membership into the Russian section of the International there. Kropotkin described her as "a most sympathetic Russian lady, who was known far and wide amongst the workers as Madame Olga. She was the working force in all the committees." Along with Utin, his wife Natalia, Viktor and Yekaterina Bartenev, and Anton Trusov, she took part in the Basel congress of the IWMA.

In 1867, Nikolay Zhukovsky, her brother-in-law, convinced her to fund a newspaper he was planning with Mikhail Bakunin. Named Narodnoye delo, the first issue was published in September 1868. When conflicts arose in the émigré community about the direction of the paper, Levashova used her financial influence to press Bakunin to resign from the editorial board in favour of Utin.

She returned to Russia in 1874, to her estate in Kamenka, in Volga, where she hosted members of the liberal intelligentsia.

== Family ==
Olga married Valery Nikolayevich Levashov (Russian: Валерий Николаевич Левашов), a nobleman from Nizhny Novgorod, who died in 1877 at his estate.

Her sister, Adélaïda Zinoviev, married Nikolay Zhukovsky in 1865. Their maternal grandfather was Antoine-Henri Jomini. His eldest daughter, Adelaide (Russian: Аделаида Генриховна Жомини), married Stepan Vasilyevich Zinovyev (Russian: Степан Васильевич Зиновьев).
