= Alexander Pypin =

Russian literary historian, ethnographer, journalist and editor

- Александр Николаевич Пыпин
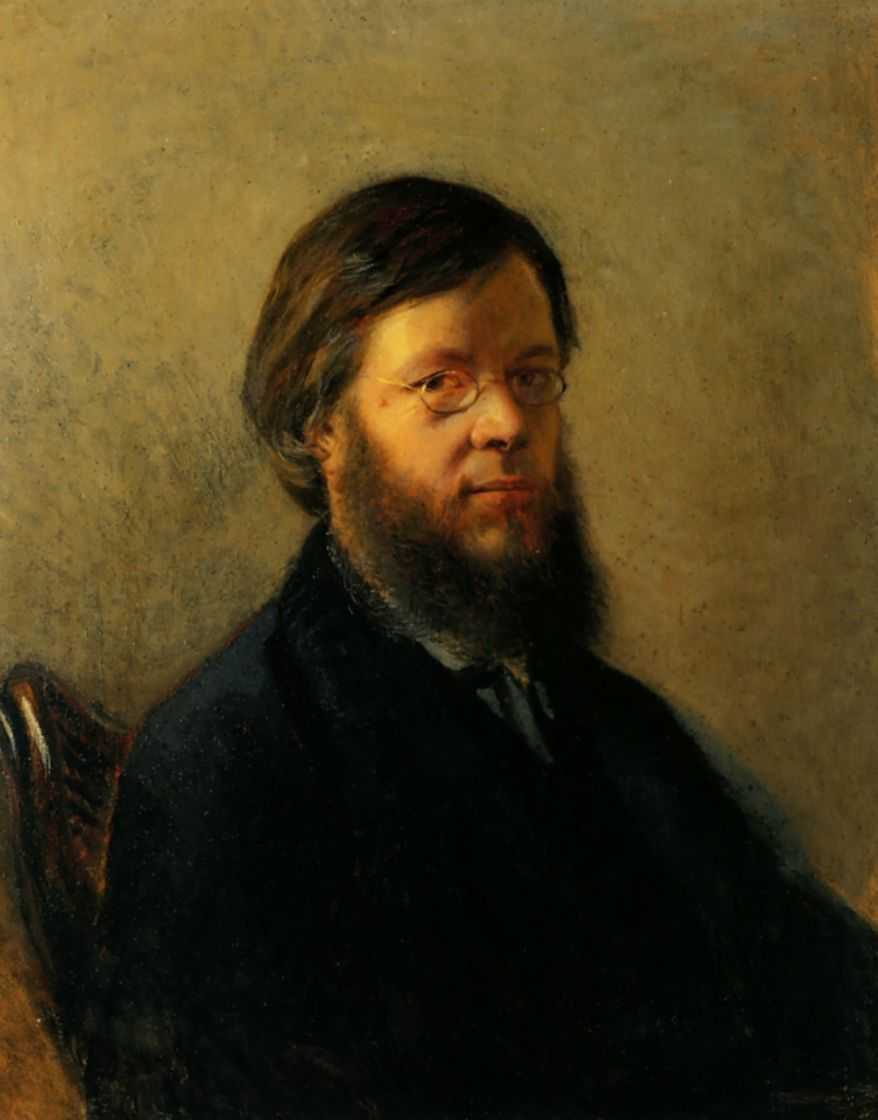
- Alexander Pypin. Portrait by Nikolai Ge
- Born: April 6, 1833; Saratov, Russian Empire
- Died: December 9, 1904 (aged 71); Saint Petersburg, Russian Empire
- Occupations: literary historian, ethnographer, editor, author
- Years active: 1860–1904
- Spouse: Y.P. Gurskalin

Alexander Nikolayevich Pypin (Russian: Алекса́ндр Никола́евич Пы́пин; 6 April 1833 – 9 December 1904) was a Russian literary historian, ethnographer, journalist and editor; a member of the Russian Academy of Sciences and (briefly, in 1904), its vice-president. Nikolai Chernyshevsky was his cousin on the maternal side.

Pypin actively contributed to Sovremennik (which he edited in 1863–1866), Vestnik Evropy, and Otechestvennye Zapiski. Among his most acclaimed works are the History of Slavic Literatures (Vols. 1–2, 1879–1881, with Vladimir Spasovich), the History of Russian Ethnography (Vols. 1890–1892) and the History of Russian Literature (Vols. 1–4, 1911–1913, posthumously).
