= Gustave Lefrançais =

French Communard (1826–1901)

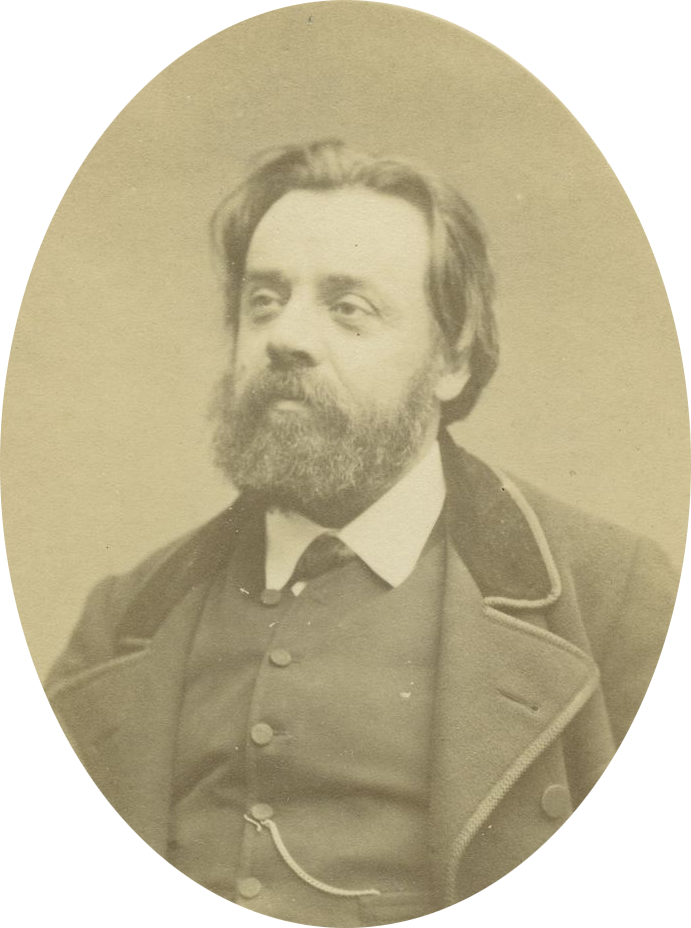
- Lefrançais (1871)
- Born: 30 January 1826; Angers, Maine-et-Loire, France
- Died: 16 May 1901 (aged 75); Paris, France
- Resting place: Père Lachaise Cemetery; 48°51′35.78″N 2°24′0″E
- Occupation: Teacher
- Relatives: Jérôme Lalande (great uncle)

Gustave Adolphe Lefrançais (1826–1901) was a French teacher and journalist, known for participating in the Paris Commune, the International Workingmen's Association (IWA) and Jura Federation.

== Biography ==
Gustave Adolphe Lefrançais was born on 30 January 1826, in Angers, the son of a workshop head at the local Arts et Métiers school. Lefrançais moved to Paris at the age of 10; in 1842, he enrolled in the École Normale Primaire in Versailles, from which he graduated in 1844. During his time at the École Normale, Lefrançais' schoolmaster influenced him to adopt a revolutionary political ideology, which caused him difficulty when he attempted to find work as a teacher. After working in a number of Parisian schools, in February 1846, he received a job at a school in Seine-et-Oise, but he was forced out of his position after five months due to hostility from a local priest. He worked as a builder until the outbreak of the French Revolution of 1848, which he participated in.

After the revolution, Lefrançais joined the Association of Socialist Teachers. Together with his colleagues Pauline Roland and Jeanne Deroin, he published a programme for progressive education, which attracted the attention of the French authorities. He was arrested and, after three months in pre-trial detention, he was sentenced to two years of probation for "possessing weapons of war". He moved to Dijon, where he was arrested again on 22 January 1851 for possession of weapons. On 27 March 1851, he was banned from teaching due to the publication of his educational programme. Following the 1851 French coup d'état, he fled into exile in London, where he lived in poverty together with Joseph Déjacque, with whom he established a cooperative restaurant.

In 1853, Lefrançais returned to France, which was now under the rule of the Second French Empire, and worked several jobs throughout the 1850s. He became involved in the Scottish Rite of Freemasonry in 1863, but soon left the organisation, considering it to be "the most insipid and the most religious of charitable societies". He then returned to activism as a popular speaker at a number of political clubs, where he advocated for collectivism and the abolition of marriage and inheritance, for which he was imprisoned in 1869 and fined in 1870.

During the Siege of Paris, Lefrançais participated in the defence of the 4th arrondissement and called for the Government of National Defence to ensure the supply of food and housing for the city's inhabitants. On 31 October 1870, he participated in a food riot, for which he was arrested and imprisoned for four months. While in prison, on 7 November, he was elected as the mayor of the 20th arrondissement of Paris; he was also among the revolutionary socialists that were nominated by the International Workingmen's Association (IWA) for the 1871 French legislative election, but he was defeated. On 24 February 1871, he was acquitted of the charges against him and released from prison. On 26 March, he was elected by the 4th arrondissement to the council of the Paris Commune; he was elected as the commune's president on 29 March and served on its executive committee, before joining its labour and trade committee on 3 April and finance committee on 21 April. In the final days of the commune, he fought on the barricades at the Bastille and managed to escape after the commune's suppression. He was sentenced to death in absentia on 30 August 1872.

Lefrançais fled to the Swiss city of Geneva, where he hid under an assumed name and participated in the local section of the IWA. In the split between the Marxists and anti-authoritarians, he sided with the latter, co-founding the Jura Federation on 12 November 1871. Together with other French socialists, including Benoît Malon, François-Charles Ostyn and Antoine Perrare, he formed a propaganda committee for the anti-authoritarian section and contributed to a number of anti-authoritarian publications. He also chaired the St. Imier Congress in 1872 and spoke at the closing meeting of the Jura Federation in 1873. During this time he supported himself by working a series of different jobs in Geneva: he worked as a clerk for a wine merchant, taught at a boarding school together with Nikolay Zhukovsky and assisted Élisée Reclus in his geographical work. In July 1876, he was wounded in a duel with Eugène Vermersch, after the latter had published a hit piece against François Jourde.

After the passage of a general amnesty for Communards in 1880, Lefrançais returned to Paris and resumed his political activism, criticising universal suffrage as insufficient without representative recall. In the 1889 French legislative election, he stood as a protest candidate in the 18th arrondissement of Paris, but received only 68 votes. In 1897, he came down with paralysis, but managed to recover. On 19 July 1898, he took over management of the newspaper L'Aurore, but after receiving a fine for his publications in the paper the following year, he resigned on 14 June 1899. He was cared for by his granddaughter during the last years of his life, which he spent in the 14th arrondissement of Paris. Gustave Adolphe Lefrançais died on 16 May 1901 and his body was cremated at Père Lachaise Cemetery three days later. In his will, he expressed a sustained commitment to his revolutionary socialist and anti-authoritarian ideals.
