= Nikolai Utin =

Russian revolutionary (1841–1883)

Nikolai Isaakovitch Utin
- Николай Исаакович Утин
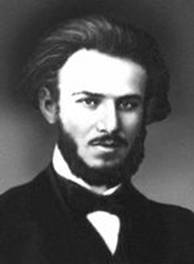
- Utin in 1921
- Born: August 8, 1841; Kherson, Russian Empire
- Died: December 1, 1883 (aged 42); Saint Petersburg, Russian Empire
- Resting place: Novodevichy Cemetery (Saint Petersburg)
- Spouse: Natalia Utin (née Korsini)
- Relatives: Yakov Utin (brother); Boris Utin (brother); Yevgeny Utin (brother)

Nikolai Isaakovitch Utin (Russian: Николай Исаакович Утин, French: Nicolas Outine; 8 August 1841 – 1 December 1883) was a Russian socialist and revolutionary. He grew up in Saint Petersburg, and became a charismatic leader of the student movement. Because of his revolutionary activities, he spent most of his adult life in political exile in Switzerland, where he participated in the founding of the Russian section of the International Workingmen's Association and kept up correspondence with liberals and revolutionaries across Europe. In the conflict between Mikhail Bakunin and Karl Marx, he supported Marx, and through his involvement with Geneva journals Narodnoye delo and l'Égalité as a writer and editor, he played an important role in increasing support for Marx at Bakunin's expense. He was extremely influential in revolutionary circles until the breakup of the First International in 1876, whereupon he withdrew from politics and returned to Russia.

== Career ==
=== Russia ===
Nikolai Utin was born 8 August 1841 in Kherson in the Russian Empire (now Ukraine), the seventh of eight children of Isaak Iosifovich Utin (1812–1876) and Maria Isaakovna Utina (?–1870). His father, an extremely successful wine merchant, was a Jewish convert to Russian Orthodoxy. In the mid-1850s, the family moved to a townhouse in Saint Petersburg and became prominent members of the social and intellectual community.

All five Utin brothers went to Saint Petersburg University; Nikolai entered the historial-philological faculty in 1858. This was during the reforms of Alexander II, when restrictions on access to education were being loosened. Students created social and political groups and campaigned for further freedoms; instead, in an attempt to control the spread of nihilist radicalism, the authorities placed further restrictions, including raised student fees, reduced fee exemptions, and bans on meetings and student organizations. Nikolai Utin emerged as a charismatic student leader, encouraging his fellow students towards political aims. His speeches, along with the manifestos and leaflets circulated by a group that became known as "Utin's party", contributed to the street protests of 26 and 27 September, at which both Nikolai and his younger brother Yevgeny were arrested, along with nearly 300 other protesters. Nikolai's brother Boris was a professor of the university at the time, and resigned in protest over the university's failure to enact democratizing reforms. The university closed on 20 December 1861, and was not reopened until 1863.

Utin's father secured his release from the Peter and Paul Fortress on 4 December. Utin shortly thereafter became a leading member of Land and Liberty, closely co-operating with Polish revolutionaries in advance of the January Uprising. The outbreak of armed revolution in Russian-held Poland made remaining in St Petersburg too dangerous; he fled Russia for London in May 1863. He was tried in absentia on 27 November 1865 and sentenced to death by firing squad.

=== Exile ===
Utin was one of many students who emigrated from Russia in 1861-1863 as a result of the repression of the student movement and the harsh reaction to the January Uprising. These members of the "young emigration", who were nihilists and great devotees of Nikolai Chernyshevsky, clashed politically with the older generation of Russian and Polish political emigres, who found them impractical, untested, and impatient. For their part, the students considered the older generation hopelessly out of touch. In particular, Utin worried that the émigré communities were too divided to effectively combat tsarism. He urged Nikolai Ogaryov and Alexander Herzen, the editors of the influential journal Kolokol (The Bell), to consider "reforming the publication and content of Kolokol." The aim was to create a mouthpiece around which exiled Russians could unite, with Ogaryov and Herzen at the centre, but they saw Utin's proposals instead as a threat to their control of the journal.

Utin would eventually arrive in Vevey, Switzerland in 1864. At a "unity conference" that Utin helped to organize in Geneva over the New Year in 1864/5, the ideological divide between the two generations having grown even further, Utin successfully convinced the others of his age group to endorse his claim to Kolokol and his demand that the previous editors step aside. In 1867 Utin again tried to involve Ogaryov in a unified émigré journal, this time with Lev Mechnikov and Nikolai Zhukovsky, and was again unsuccessful.

When anarchist Mikhail Bakunin founded the monthly journal Narodnoye delo (The People's Cause) with funding from Zoya Obolenskaya in Geneva in 1868, he initially made Utin a co-editor with Nikolai Zhukovsky, but ultimately did not allow him to take part in creating the first issue. Utin, who did not believe that Bakunin's anarchism would appeal to a Russian audience, took control of the journal with the backing of several fellow emigres, including Olga Levashova, Zhukovsky's sister-in-law. Elisabeth Dmitrieff, a co-editor of the journal, used her inheritance to fund the newspaper. Utin ran the journal from 1868 to 1870.

Well known in the expat Russian revolutionary community, he participated in the foundation of the Russian section of the International Workingmen's Association (IWA) with Elisabeth Dmitrieff. The Geneva group that founded this section, following Johann Philip Becker's suggestions, wrote to Karl Marx for support and strongly distanced themselves from Bakunin.

Utin wrote the "Nouvelles Etrangères" section for l'Égalité, the French-language IWA newspaper based in Geneva, and eventually became editor-in-chief. When he turned away from Bakunin and towards the positions of Marx, he used his influence at this newspaper and Narodnoye delo to keep the revolutionary community in Geneva sympathetic to Marx and not Bakunin.

On 17 April 1871, he wrote to Marx about his doubts regarding the Paris Commune, a movement that he ultimately did not join. However, he remained sympathetic to Elisabeth Dmitrieff, who had returned to Russia after the events of the Paris Commune, and so he was warned by Yekaterina Barteneva and her husband Victor Bartenev when Dmitrieff's partner, and later husband, Ivan Davydovski, had been arrested for murder and was in need of his help. On 17 December 1876, he wrote to Karl Marx, who found a lawyer to accept the case pro bono.

After the split of the IWA, Utin withdrew from politics. He returned to Russia in 1878 and died on 1 December 1883 in Saint Petersburg.

== Writing ==
Utin wrote for Kolokol and Vestnik Evropy under various pseudonyms.

== Personal life ==
In 1863, Nikolai Utin married Natalia Korsini (1841 - after 1913), daughter of architect Geronimo Korsini and writer Maria Antonovna Korsini. She was among the first women to attend Saint Petersburg University and was arrested in 1861 during the student unrest. She followed him into exile in 1863 and returned with him in 1878. She wrote for Vestnik Evropy, under her own name or as N. I. Tal. Her 1885 novel Zhizn za zhizn (Жизнь за жизнь, "Life for Life") caused a scandal.

Utin's siblings were also involved in the student movement of the 1860s. Boris Isaakovitch Utin (1832–1872) was a professor at Saint Petersburg University. Yakov Isaakovitch Utin (1839-1916) was a businessman and privy counsellor. Yevgeny Isaakovitch Utin (1843–1894) was a lawyer and journalist, a regular contributor to Vestnik Evropy. Their sister, Liuba, married Mikhail Stasyulevich, an academic who had been one of Nikolai Utin's teachers and would become the founder and chief editor of Vestnik Evropy, in April 1859.

== See also ==
- History of Russia (1855–1894)
