= Nikolay Zhukovsky (revolutionary) =

Russian revolutionary (1833–1895)

- Николай Жуковский
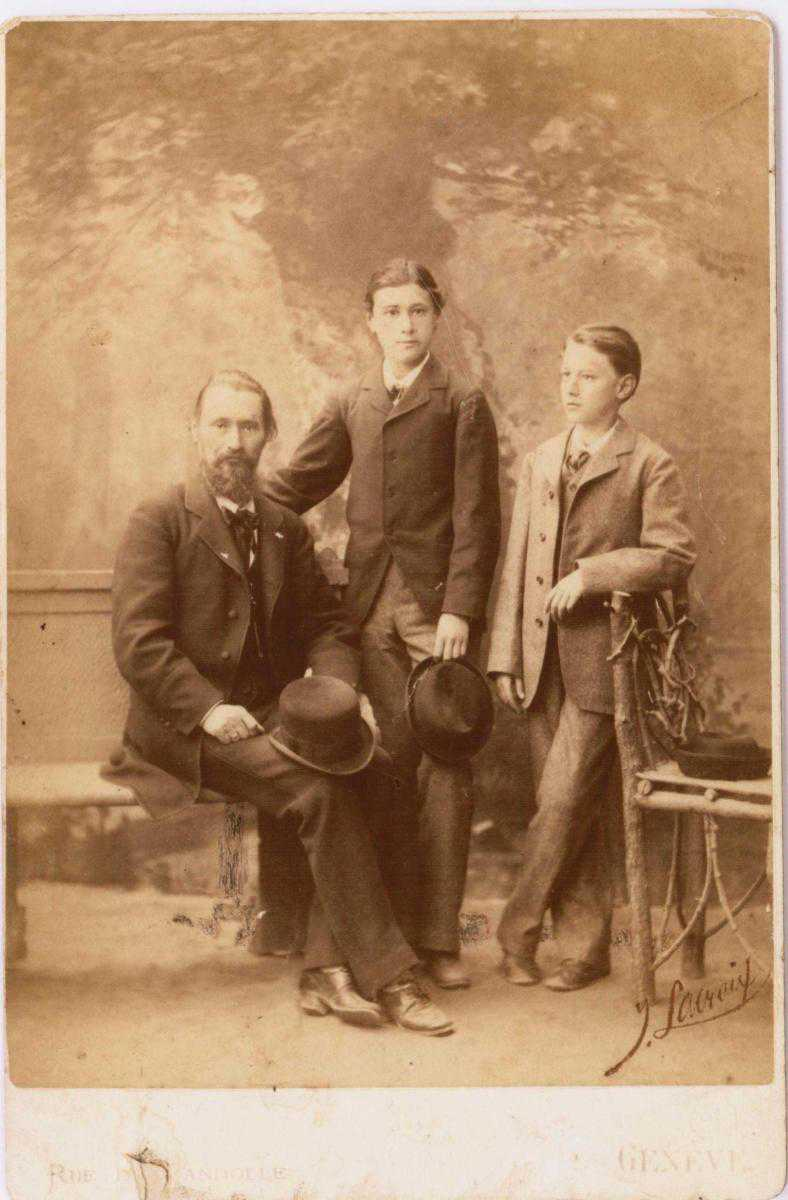
- Zhukovsky (left) and his children
- Born: Nikolay Ivanovich Zhukovsky; 2 November [O.S. 21 October] 1833; Ufa, Orenburg Governorate, Russian Empire
- Died: 11 May 1895 (aged 61); Geneva, Switzerland
- Education: Moscow University
- Occupation: Journalist
- Years active: 1861–1878
- Organisations: League of Peace and Freedom (1867–1868); International Alliance of Socialist Democracy (1868–1869); International Workingmen's Association (1869–1872)
- Movement: Narodism, anarchism

Nikolay Ivanovich Zhukovsky (Russian: Николай Иванович Жуковский; (Note: Also known by the French: Nicolas Joukovsky.) (2 November [O.S. 21 October] 1833 – 11 May 1895) was a Russian revolutionary, journalist and publisher. Born into the Russian nobility, he fled the country due to his involvement in revolutionary activism. He became involved in the Free Russian Press and joined the exiled Russian anarchist movement, led by Mikhail Bakunin. Following Bakunin's expulsion from the International Workingmen's Association, he contributed to the publication of a series of anarchist newspapers.

== Biography ==
Nikolay Ivanovich Zhukovsky was born into Russian noble family, in the city of Ufa, on 2 November [O.S. 21 October] 1833. He was raised into the Russian Orthodox Church by his father Ivan, a local judge and state official. Zhukovsky studied at Moscow University, from which he graduated in 1854. He later moved to Saint Petersburg, where in 1861, he became active in revolutionary circles. In 1862, he was forced to flee Russia and vowed never to return. In exile, he became involved in the publication of the Russian émigre newspaper Kolokol. In 1863, he moved to the German city of Dresden, where he oversaw the smuggling of publications by the Free Russian Press into Russia. He was tried in absentia for his involvement in a clandestine publishing house run by Pyotr Ballod, for which he was stripped of his property rights and sentenced to exile.

In 1864, he moved to the Swiss city of Geneva, where he participated in a congress of exiled Russian revolutionaries. The following year, he married Adelaida Zinovieva. During his time in Geneva, he regularly corresponded with Alexander Herzen and Nikolai Ogarev, the leaders of the Russian revolutionary movement in exile. In 1867, he joined the League of Peace and Freedom within which he met the Russian anarchist Mikhail Bakunin. Bakunin and Zhukovsky received a sponsorship from the German revolutionary Johann Philipp Becker, to the disapproval of the leading German communist Karl Marx. With funding from Zoya Obolenskaya, in 1868, Bakunin established the monthly anarchist newspaper Narodnoye delo, on which Zhukovsky collaborated as co-editor. After the first issue had taken a markedly anarchist line, praising destruction and social disorder, Nikolai Utin received backing from Zhukovsky's sister-in-law Olga Levashova to seize control of the newspaper.

In October 1868, Bakunin and Zhukovsky established the International Alliance of Socialist Democracy, through which they aimed to gain control of the International Workingmen's Association. In 1869, Zhukovsky joined the IWA itself. As a member of the International's Romandy Federation, in 1871, he began publishing its official newspaper La Solidarité. He left the International in 1872, protesting Bakunin's expulsion from the organisation. In 1874, he established an anarchist publishing house, known in Russian as Rabotnik and in French as Le Travailleur. From 1875 to 1876, he edited its official newspaper Rabotnik; and from 1877 to 1878, he contributed to the French language newspaper Le Travailleur, edited by Élisée Reclus. In 1878, he also edited the journal Obshchina. Zhukovsky died in Geneva on 10 or 11 May 1895.

== Bibliography ==
- Bankowski-Züllig, Monika (2 November 2006). "Nicolas Joukowsky". Historical Dictionary of Switzerland (in German).
- Bianco, René (2026). "Le Travailleur: revue socialiste révolutionnaire" [Le Travailleur: revolutionary socialist review]. Le Bianco (in French).
- Korotkov, Yuri N. (1969–1978). "Жуковский Николай Иванович" [Zhukovsky Nikolay Ivanovich]. In Prokhorov, Alexander (ed.). Great Soviet Encyclopedia (in Russian) (3rd ed.).
- McClellan, Woodford (2018). "Russians in the IWMA". In Bensimon, Fabrice; Deluermoz, Quentin; Moisand, Jeanne (eds.). “Arise Ye Wretched of the Earth”: The First International in a Global Perspective. Brill. pp. 193–206. ISBN 978-90-04-33545-5.
