= Yevgeny Utin =

Russian lawyer and journalist (1843–1894)

Yevgeny Isaakovitch Utin
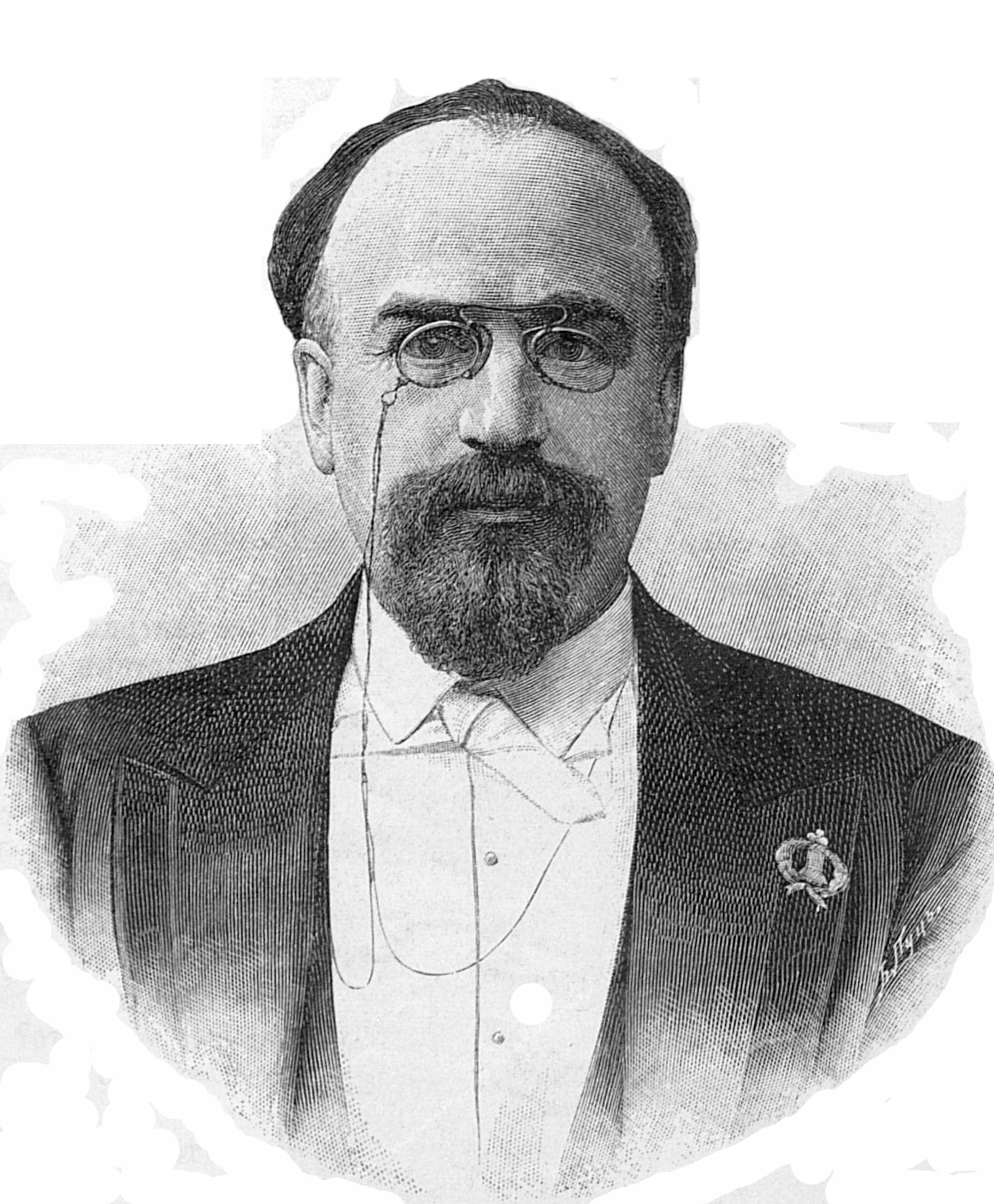
- Born: November 3, 1843; Saint Petersburg, Russian Empire
- Died: August 9, 1894 (aged 50); His estate in Volhynian Governorate
- Relatives: Yakov Utin, brother Boris Utin, brother Nikolai Utin, brother

Yevgeny Isaakovitch Utin (Russian: Евгений Исаакович Утин) (3 November 1843 – 9 August 1894) was a Russian lawyer and journalist. He was arrested in the student unrest in Saint Petersburg in 1861 and held in the Peter and Paul Fortress for some time. After graduating from the Faculty of Law at Saint Petersburg University, he spent several years abroad. He participated in the trial of Sergey Nechayev and other political defendants. Following a fatal duel with Aleksandr Zhokhov, he was imprisoned for five months.

Utin was an active writer for Vestnik Evropy from its inception in 1866. He reported on the Russo-Turkish War from Bulgaria.

== Selected publications ==
- Вильгельм I и Бисмарк ("Wilhelm I and Bismarck"), 1892
- Из литературы и жизни ("From Literature and Life"), 1896, 2 volumes. Posthumous publication of his most important journal articles.

== Bibliography ==
- "Утин, Борис Исаакович". Granat Encyclopedic Dictionary (in Russian).
- Slonimsky, Ludwig. "Утин, Евгений Исакович". Brockhaus and Efron Encyclopedic Dictionary (in Russian).
- "УТИН ЕВГЕНИЙ ИСАКОВИЧ". Russian Biographical Dictionary (in Russian).
- "УТИН ЕВГЕНИЙ ИСААКОВИЧ". Dictionary of pseudonyms of Russian writers, scientists and public figures (in Russian).
