= Yekaterina Barteneva =

Russian socialist revolutionary (1843–1914)

Yekaterina Grigoryevna Barteneva
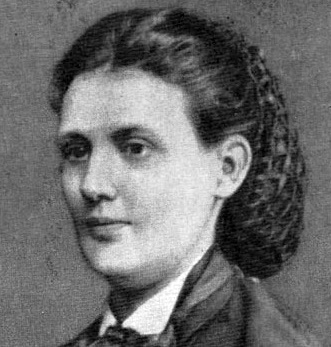
- Barteneva, c. 1880
- Born: 6 June 1843; Saint Petersburg, Russian Empire
- Died: 1 September 1914 (aged 71); Saint Petersburg, Russian Empire
- Occupations: Socialist, Revolutionary
- Known for: Involvement in the anarchist movement and the First International
- Spouse: Viktor Ivanovich Bartenev
- Children: Viktor, Grigory, German

Yekaterina Grigoryevna Barteneva (Russian: Екатерина Григорьевна Бартенева, née Bronevskaya (Броневская; 6 June 1843 — 1 September 1914) was a Russian socialist and revolutionary.

== Biography ==
Landowners of noble origin, Yekaterina Barteneva and her husband Viktor Ivanovich Bartenev (1838–1918) left Russia in 1867 for Geneva, where they were part of Bakunin's anarchist movement for a few years, before joining the Russian section of the First International with Nikolai Utin in 1869. The Bartenevs were in Paris during the Commune, where they were acquaintances with Pyotr Lavrov, Anne and Victor Jaclard, Elisabeth Dmitrieff, Louise Michel, and Georges Clemenceau, among others. During the fighting, Barteneva assisted wounded Communards. She would later try, unsuccessfully, to publish a memoir of her time in the Commune with Russkoye Bogatstvo.

After the fall of the Commune, she returned to Saint Petersburg. She worked on liberal journals Otechestvennye Zapiski and Delo, was in contact with members of Zemlia i Volia and Narodnaya Volya, and welcomed many populists to her home, such as Dmitry Klementz, Sergey Stepnyak-Kravchinsky, Natalya Armfeldt, Nikolai Kibalchich, Nikolai Morozov, and Olga Lyubatovich. She was involved in the dynamiting of a train and hid Vera Zasulich from police after her assassination of Fyodor Trepov.

In July 1876, she gave her properties in the provinces of Kostroma and Yaroslavl to the peasants and went to live in Buy with her friend Natalia Armfeldt. In January 1889, she returned to Paris, where she worked in the Russian section of the Exposition Universelle. In July, she attended the first congress of the Second International and was elected secretary. On her return to Saint Petersburg in September, she joined the illegal social democratic circle founded by Mikhail Brusnev and met, among others, Olga and Vladimir Ulyanov (the future Lenin).

She was under police surveillance and, in 1891, her house was searched and illegal publications were discovered there. Relegated by the tsarist authorities to Pskov, she founded a school for workers and a public library there. In August 1898, she was allowed to return to Saint Petersburg. As a member of the menshevik RSDLP, she participated in the demonstrations of the 1905 Revolution. Reduced to poverty, she died of cancer on 1 September 1914 at the Eleninskaya Hospital for poor women in Saint Petersburg and was buried in Novoderevenskoye cemetery.

== Family ==
Yekaterina Bronevskaya married Viktor Ivanovich Bartenev, an army officer, in 1863. They had three sons, Viktor (born 1864), Grigory (born 1866), and German (born 1881). Viktor became a revolutionary like his parents and was exiled to Obdorsk.

== Bibliography ==
- (ru) Ivan Knijnik-Vetrov, Barteneva, sotsialistka i pisatelnitsa'' [Barteneva, seltevik is sutesik], « Katorga i ssylka », XI, 1929
- Knijnik-Vetrov, Ivan (1964). Русские деятельницы Первого Интернационала и Парижской коммуны. Е. Л. Дмитриева, А. В. Жаклар, Е. Г. Бартенева. М.-Л. [Russian Activists of the First International and the Paris Commune. E. L. Dmitrieva, A. V. Jaclard, E. G. Barteneva.] (in Russian). Moskva-Leningrad: Nauka.
