= Boris Utin =

Russian professor and lawyer (1832–1872)

Boris Isaakovitch Utin
- Born: 1832
- Died: June 13, 1872; Saint Petersburg, Russian Empire
- Relatives: Yakov Utin, brother Nikolai Utin, brother Yevgeny Utin, brother

Boris Isaakovitch Utin (1832–1872) was a professor at Saint Petersburg University. He was sympathetic to the student movement in Russia and resigned during the student unrest of 1861, afterwards becoming a lawyer and a member of the Saint Petersburg District Court and the Saint Petersburg Court of Justice.

His close friendship with Karolina Pavlova inspired a number of her poems.

== Selected publications ==
- Ueber die Ehrenverletzung nach russischem Recht, seit dem XVII. Jahrhundert [On defamation in Russian law] (in German). Laakmann. 1857.
- О мировой юстиции и самоуправлении в Англии ("On world justice and self-government in England"), 1860
- Очерк исторического образования суда присяжных в Англии ("Essay on the historical formation of the jury in England"), 1860
- Судебная реформа ("Judicial Reform"), 1862

== Bibliography ==
- "УТИН БОРИС ИСААКОВИЧ". Russian Biographical Dictionary (in Russian).
- "УТИН БОРИС ИСААКОВИЧ". Brockhaus and Efron Encyclopedic Dictionary (in Russian).
- "УТИН БОРИС ИСААКОВИЧ". Dictionary of pseudonyms of Russian writers, scientists and public figures (in Russian).
- "УТИН БОРИС ИСААКОВИЧ". Big Russian Biographical Dictionary (in Russian).
- "УТИН Борис Исаакович". Encyclopedia of Russian Jewry (in Russian).
