= Ekaterina Fleischitz =

Russian lawyer (1888–1968)

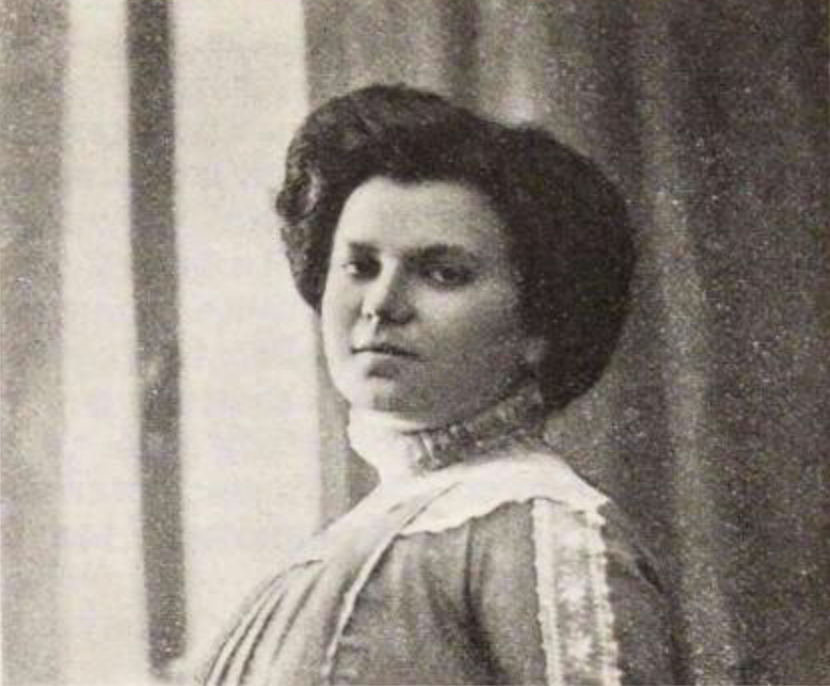
- Fleischitz circa 1910
- Born: 1888; Poltava Governorate, Russian Empire
- Died: 1968 (aged 79–80)

Ekaterina Abramovna Fleischitz (or Fleishits, 1888–1968) was a Russian lawyer and author recognised as the first Russian woman to become a lawyer. Her first appearance in the courtroom prompted debate about women's work as lawyers, but she later became known as an authority on Russian law.

== Life ==
Fleischitz was born in the Poltava Governorate of the Russian Empire in 1888. Having graduated from the Sorbonne University Law School in Paris in 1907, Fleischitz passed the bar exam of St Petersburg University in 1909.

That year, she gained a position as an attorney’s assistant (prisiazhnyi poverennyi) in St Petersburg Court. When she appeared in her first court case as a defence attorney, the prosecutor left the room, refusing to plead his case against a woman. When this case was referred to the Governing Senate, it was ruled that Russian law did not allow women to act as attorneys and Fleischitz's status was revoked. This case prompted a parliamentary debate about women’s access to the legal profession, which was finally allowed in 1917.

Fleischitz joined the League for Women’s Equal Rights, which drafted legal opinions and laws on issues such as divorce and prostitution.

She went on to have a successful career as a lawyer and worked as a senior researcher at the All-Union Institute of Legal Studies in the 1960s.

Fleischitz wrote several books about the Soviet legal system, including the posthumously published Civil Codes of the Soviet Republics, which was translated into English.
