= Historiography of the Paris Commune =

Development of the history of the 1871 Paris Commune

In the history of labor, socialism, and revolutions, the historiography of the Paris Commune connects its 1871 events with the revolutions of 1848 and 1917. Historical interpretation of the Commune influenced subsequent revolutionary ideology and sociopolitical events. As of the late 20th century, there were two main historiographical schools of thought: the political interpretation, that the Commune was a patriotic eruption of fury in response to circumstantial hardship following the Siege of Paris; and the social interpretation, that the Commune was the result of macro socioeconomic forces boiling over, e.g., that it was a war of class struggle. Histories in the latter interpretation have used the Commune's events to make ideological points on behalf of their authors, either that the Commune was an illegitimate, criminal aggression, or that the Commune was the consummation of revolutionary momentum. Similarly, historians within both the political and social interpretations have disagreed as to whether the Commune was inevitable or accidental (though there is agreement that the uprising was unplanned), a harbinger of the future or a sunset for revolutionary zeal.

Shortly after the brutal end of the Commune, which killed, imprisoned, or exiled 100,000 Parisians, the Commune quickly became subject to polarizing legend. Conservative contemporaries of the Commune attributed the insurrection to revolutionary conspiracy by the First International and its affiliates. Partly in response, revolutionary socialists did not acknowledge organizations as contributing to the Commune. Their sense of the revolution's legitimacy rested in its popular spontaneity, as compared to the deliberate planning of a coup. Scholarship of the Commune began with Georges Bourgin's Histoire de la Commune just prior to World War I, and thus became viewed through the lens of 1917. It received treatments from preeminent scholars including C.L.R. James and Henri Lefebvre, and was the subject of most of Jacques Rougerie's career. Communist historiography fell out of favor by the end of the 20th century. Where there had previously been debate over whether the Commune was a revolutionary socialist movement or a movement of artisans, Rougerie's La Commune: 1871 (1988) attributed the Commune to an amalgam of both. Roger Gould's 1995 Insurgent Identities challenged Marxist (David Harvey) and humanist urban theory (Lefebvre and Manuel Castells) narratives of the Commune.

== Bibliography ==
- Gould, Roger V. (1995). "Collective Identities and Social Conflict in Nineteenth-Century France". Insurgent Identities: Class, Community, and Protest in Paris from 1848 to the Commune. University of Chicago Press. ISBN 0-226-30560-0.
- Johnson, Martin Phillip (1996). "Introduction". The Paradise of Association: Political Culture and Popular Organizations in the Paris Commune of 1871. Ann Arbor: The University of Michigan Press. ISBN 978-0-472-10724-7.
- Martin, Dorothea A. L. (2019). "The Experience of the Paris Commune". The Making of a Sino-Marxist World View: Perceptions and Interpretations of World History in the People's Republic of China. Routledge. pp. 68–. ISBN 978-1-315-49039-7.
- Tombs, Robert (1997). "Les Communeux dans la ville: des analyses récentes à l'étranger". Le Mouvement Social (179): 93–105. doi:10.2307/3778927. ISSN 0027-2671. JSTOR 3778927.
