= Narodnoye delo =

Newspaper founded in Geneva in 1868

- Founded: 1867
- Ceased publication: 1870
- Language: Russian
- City: Geneva
- Country: Switzerland

Narodnoye delo (Russian: Народное дело; transl. The Cause of the People) was a Russian-language newspaper founded in Geneva, Switzerland, after the congress of the League of Peace and Freedom in 1867 by a group of exiled Russian revolutionaries.

The circle involved in the writing of the newspaper wished to promote the First International in Russia, having in common with its founders their support of the Polish insurgents against the tyranny of the Russian Empire. Nikolay Zhukovsky approached Mikhail Bakunin to collaborate on the newspaper. Other Russians living on the banks of Lake Geneva agreed to join the initiative: Zoya Obolenskaya, the Polish soldier and journalist Walery Mroczkowski, Victor and Ekaterina Barteneva, Nikolai and Natalia Utin, the publisher Mikhail Elpidin, and Olga Levashova (sister-in-law of Zhukovsky). Bakunin prevented Nikolai Utin from participating in the first edition of the newspaper, which was published 1 September 1868 by Elpidin's press in Geneva. Bakunin and Nikolay Zhukovsky wrote two of the four articles published in the first issue, before Nikolai Utin took control of the editorial.

In the first issue, Zhukovsky described the newspaper as materialist, atheist, and in favour of the socioeconomic liberation of the people. Bakunin declared that the goal of the Russian people was "land and freedom", a reference to the ideas of Nikolay Chernyshevsky and of Land and Liberty.

The goal of Narodnoye delo was to demonstrate that though the peasant struggle in Russia took different forms from those described by Marx, it nevertheless promoted the same collectivization of the means of production. Thus, the declaration of intention of the first issue affirmed:

As the foundation of economic justice, we propose two fundamental theses. First, the land belongs to those who work it with their own hands, that is, to agricultural communes. Second, capital and all work tools belong to the workers, that is, to associations of workers.

It was disestablished in 1870.
