= Włodzimierz Spasowicz =

Polish lawyer

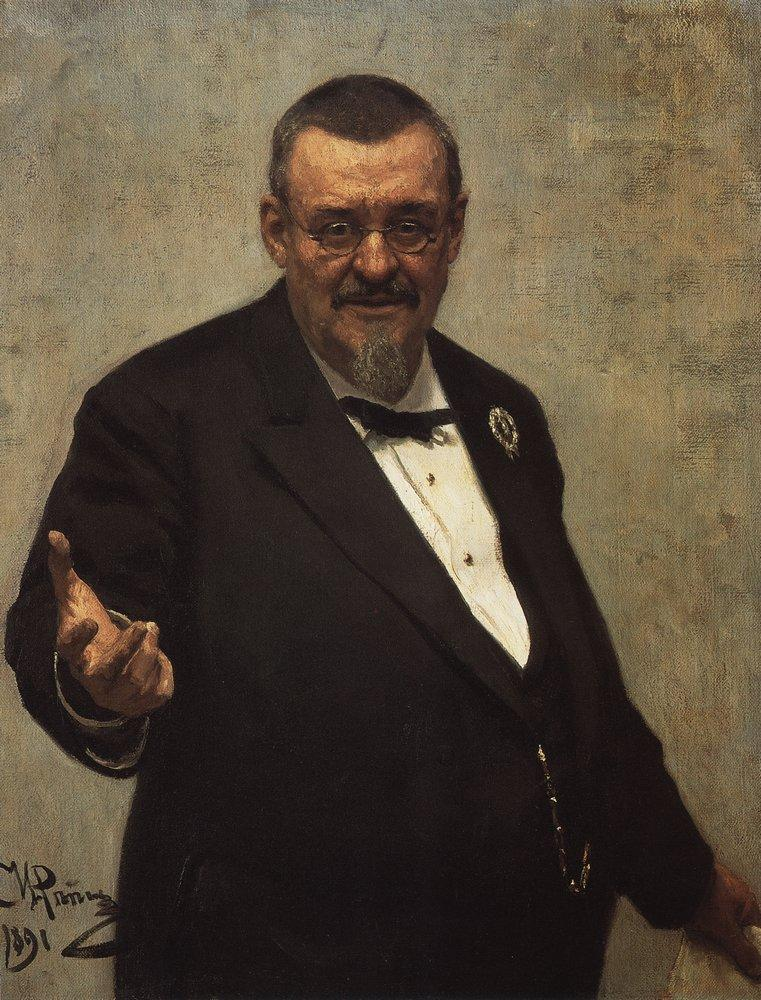
An 1891 portrait by Ilya Repin

Włodzimierz Spasowicz or Vladimir Spasovich (1829–1906) was a Polish-Russian lawyer often acclaimed as the most brilliant defense attorney of Imperial Russia.

Spasovich attended school in Minsk and studied law in St. Petersburg University, where he later became a professor. When the government was persecuting some of his students in 1861, Spasovich resigned his professorship in protest. Two years later, his textbook on criminal law was banned.

After the judicial reform of Alexander II, he emerged as a leading trial lawyer. He took part in many of the sensational political trials of the 1860s and 1870s, including the Nechayev process. Fetyukovich, a defense attorney in Dostoevsky's The Brothers Karamazov, was apparently based on Spasovich. His involvement as defence attorney in the Kroneberg case of 1876 was also discussed in the February section of Dostoevsky's A Writer's Diary; the Russian novelist thought this case proved a prime example of the dilemma that had then arisen in the Empire's new courts, where the skill and effectiveness of a lawyer could lead to the obstruction of truth and justice, contrary to their vowed custody, as finding the resources to conceal or defend morally reprehensible acts seemed as much a perquisite of the legal profession as unconvering the truth that had been hitherto obfuscated.

Spasovich was one of those who tried to bring Russia and Poland together. He founded in St. Petersburg the Polish-language newspaper Kraj and "advocated the concept of Polish cultural autonomy within Russia" in the Warsaw periodical Atheneum.

As a literary historian, Spasovich authored several articles about the literary ties between Russia and Poland as well as a concise account of Polish literary history.
