= Johann Philipp Becker =

German military officer and revolutionary (1809–1886)

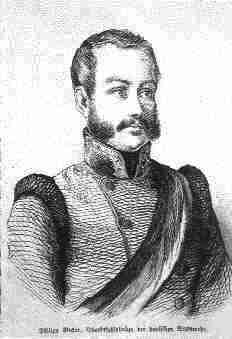
Johann Philipp Becker (1849)

Johann Phillipp Becker (20 March 1809 – 9 December 1886) was a German revolutionary and military officer who participated in the democratic movement in Germany and Switzerland in the 1830s and 1840s. In Baden during the 1848-1849 Baden-Palatinate revolution, Becker commanded the Baden Peoples Militia. In the 1860s he became a prominent figure in the First Workers International, attending all its congresses.

He was the editor of the socialist magazine Der Vorbote. Becker was one of the founders of Social Democratic Workers' Party of Germany (1869). Becker became a close friend and an associate of Karl Marx and Frederick Engels.

He died in 1886.
