= Douay =

Douay is a surname. Notable people with the surname include:

- Abel Douay (1809–1870), French general
- Félix Douay (1816–1879), French general and brother of Abel Douay

== See also ==
- Douay–Rheims Bible, an English translation of the Bible, c.1600
- Douai, a commune in northern France; the Douay spelling often refers to the English College, Douai
- Douay Catechism, a 1649 exposition of Catholic doctrine
