= Semaine sanglante =

End of the Paris Commune

- Part of the Paris Commune
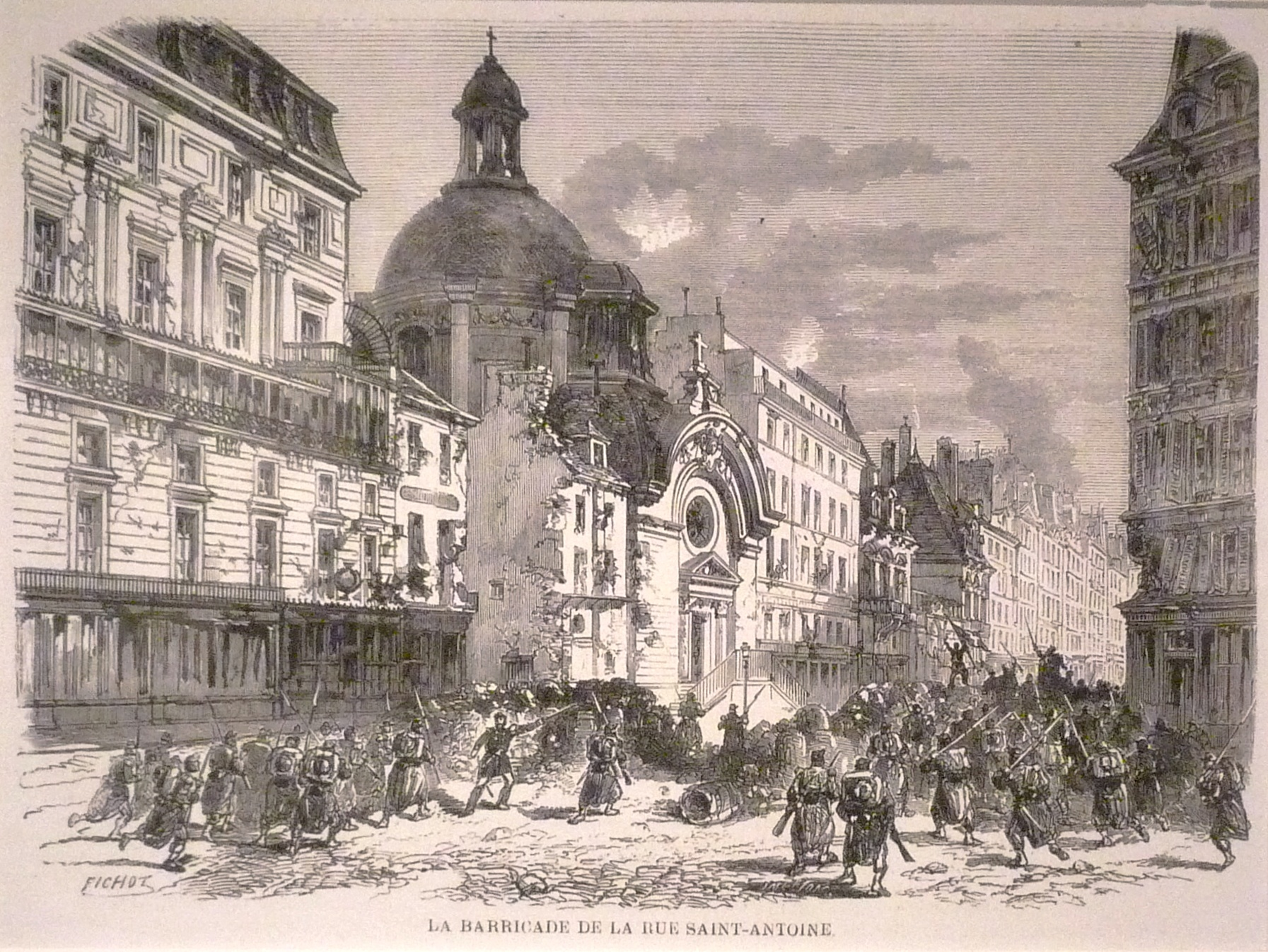
- Fight for the barricade on Rue Saint-Antoine (25 May)
Date	21–28 May 1871 (1 week)
Location	Paris, France 48°51′24″N 2°21′08″E
Result	French Army victory
Territorial changes	Recapture of Paris

Belligerents
French Third Republic: French Armed Forces	Paris Commune: National Guard; Communards

Commanders and leaders
Patrice de MacMahon Ernest Courtot de Cissey	Louis Charles Delescluze †; Jarosław Dąbrowski †

Casualties and losses
877 killed 6,454 wounded 183 missing	10,000–15,000 killed 43,000 captured

The semaine sanglante ("Bloody Week") was a weeklong battle in Paris from 21 to 28 May 1871, during which the French Army recaptured the city from the Communards. This was the final battle of the Paris Commune.

Following the Treaty of Frankfurt and France's loss in the Franco-Prussian War, on 18 March the new French government under Prime Minister Adolphe Thiers attempted to remove a large number of cannons from a park in Montmartre, to keep them out of the hands of the more radical soldiers of the Paris National Guard. In the confrontation that followed, two French generals, Claude Lecomte and Jacques Léon Clément-Thomas, were seized and executed by the National Guard. Thiers, the army commander Patrice de MacMahon and the French government hurriedly left the city, and established their headquarters in Versailles, and prepared plans to recapture the city. The Paris Commune made an unsuccessful attack on Versailles under the leadership of Louis Charles Delescluze. Between 8 and 20 May, French forces had retaken the territory surrounding Paris and began bombarding the city. On 21 May, French forces entered the city and began the Semaine sanglante.

During the week of combat, an estimated ten to fifteen thousand Commune soldiers were killed in combat or executed afterwards. The Communards took and executed about one hundred hostages, including Georges Darboy, the Archbishop of Paris, and committed arson against many Paris landmarks, including the Tuileries Palace, the Hôtel de Ville, the Palais de Justice building, the Cour de Comptes, and the Palais de la Légion d'Honneur. Fighting continued until 28 May, when the last Communard soldiers surrendered.

43,522 Communards were taken prisoner, including 1,054 women. More than half were quickly released. Fifteen thousand were tried, 13,500 of whom were found guilty. Ninety-five were sentenced to death, 251 to forced labor, and 1,169 to deportation (mostly to New Caledonia). Many Commune supporters, including several of the leaders, fled abroad, mostly to England, Belgium and Switzerland. All the prisoners and exiles received pardons in 1880 and could return home, where some resumed political careers.

== Combatants ==
On paper the Paris Commune's military force, the National Guard, was formidable; all able-bodied men in the Commune, numbering 150,000, were required to serve, and half were enrolled in armed units. At the beginning of the Semaine sanglante, the Commune was said to have had fifty thousand men in combat companies. with ten thousand soldiers on the south line, two thousand to the west, and six thousand in the southwest. South of the city, about 7,500 Communards were entrenched. Several thousand National Guard soldiers were kept as a reserve in barracks within the city, including three thousand at the Champ de Mars. However, at the beginning of May, twenty percent, or ten thousand, were reported absent without leave.

Commune historian Prosper-Olivier Lissagaray in 1876 gave slightly smaller numbers; according to his figures, 20,000 Commune soldiers defended the Right Bank and 17,000 defended the Left Bank, or 37,000 in all.

Once the fighting began, a large number of Commune soldiers, as many as half, simply stayed home and went into hiding in the cellars under their buildings. 45,522 Commune soldiers, most of whom had not fought, were taken prisoner after the fighting ended. Jacques Rougerie put the numbers of National Guard fighters who fought at just twenty thousand.

The French Army, the official forces of the Third Republic, grew from 55,000 men at the beginning of April to 120,000 men by the end of May. In the beginning, the army had few experienced officers or trained soldiers. This problem eased with the release of thousands of soldiers and officers captured during the Franco-Prussian War from German prison-camps, who returned to service upon their release.

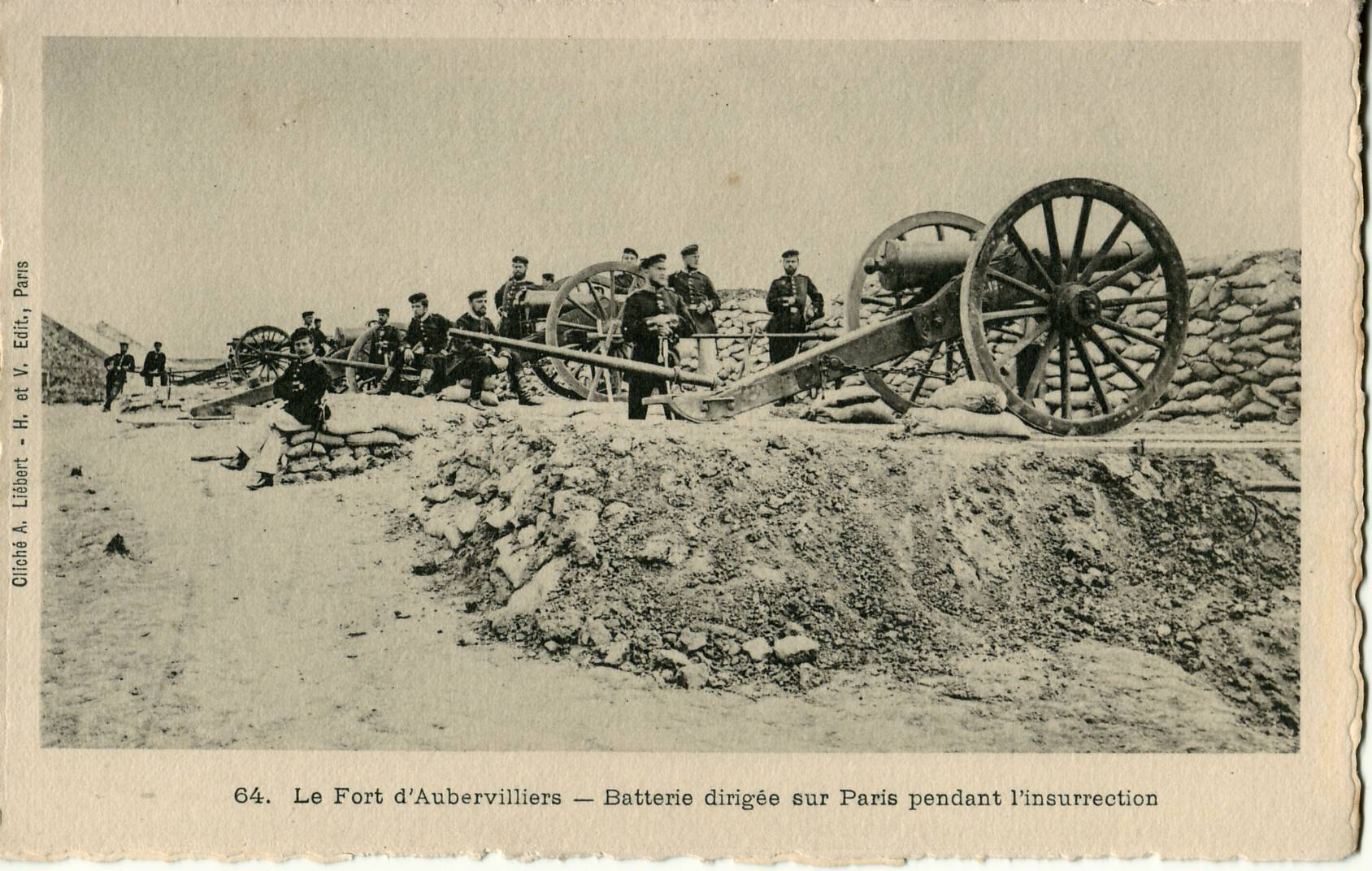
The Prussians favored the offensive against the Commune. Here, a Prussian battery at the fort of Aubervilliers, pointed at Paris. Photo by Alphonse Liébert.

The German Army, which occupied parts of France in the aftermath of the Franco-Prussian War, took no direct part in the Semaine sanglante. However, their troops stood in reserve to intervene if necessary. More importantly, the Germans allowed the French army to take up positions outside the city walls on the west.

French Army casualties during the battle were 877 killed, 6,454 wounded, and 183 missing. 43,000 Communards were taken prisoner, and 6,500 to 7,500 fled abroad.

The number of Communard soldiers killed during the week has long been disputed: Prosper-Olivier Lissagaray put the number at twenty thousand, but estimates by later historians put the probable number between ten and fifteen thousand. Most of the dead were collected by city authorities and buried in city cemeteries after the Semaine Sanglante, with a smaller number buried in suburban cemeteries. The remains of six hundred Commune soldiers, still in uniform, were found in 1897 in a mass grave in a cemetery in the 20th arrondissement. A handful of rudimentary graves were discovered during the construction of the Paris Metro and at other building sites.

== Prelude ==
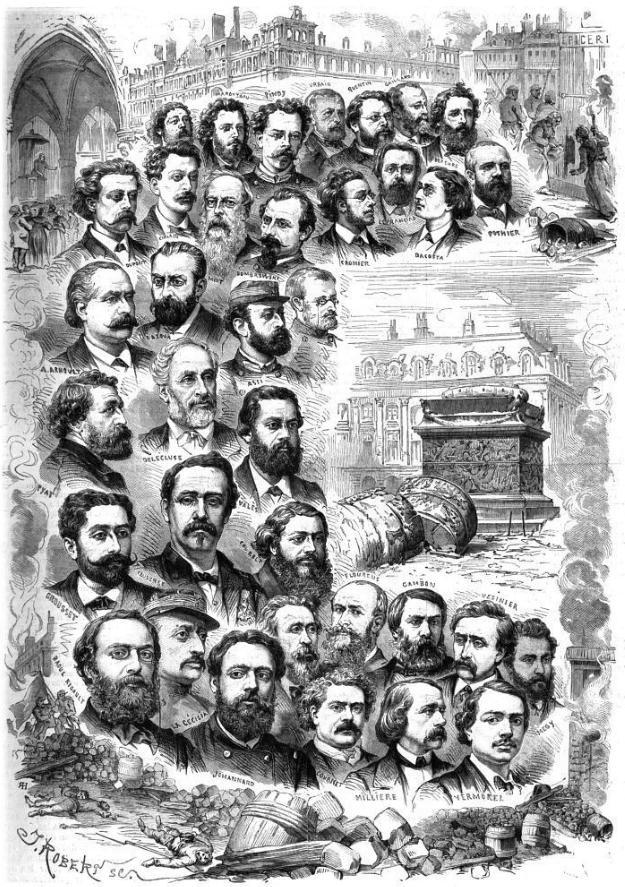
The Commune leaders with the destroyed Column of the Place Vendôme

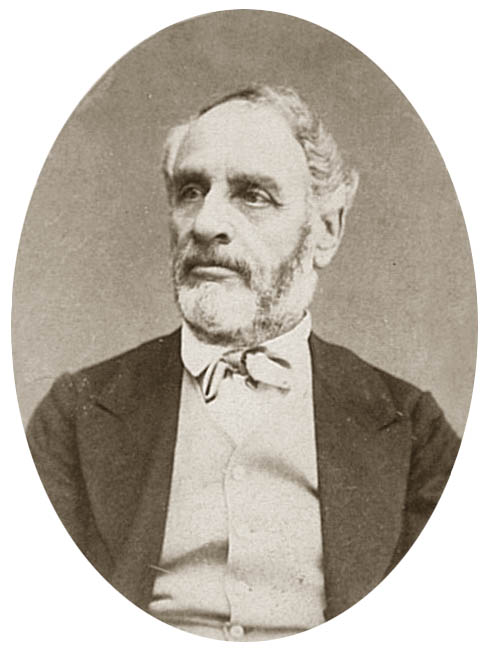
Louis Charles Delescluze, military commander of the Commune

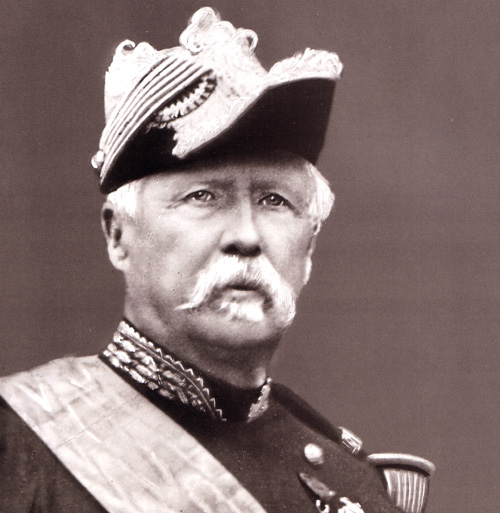
Patrice de Mac-Mahon, commander of French army forces

By March 1871, the French Army had been defeated by German forces in the Franco-Prussian War. The Treaty of Frankfurt, which ended the war, forced France to pay billions of francs in war indemnity and cede Alsace–Lorraine. In Paris, soldiers from the National Guard clashed with the French Army on 18 March when the army tried to remove 227 cannons from a depot in Montmartre. The guardsmen killed two army generals, and the National Guard seized control of the city. Adolphe Thiers, the President of France, withdrew the government of France from Paris, first to Bordeaux and then to Versailles.

The Commune government was divided into various political factions. Being led by several committees with different political agendas, it lacked a commander. In April, the Commune launched a military expedition against the Versailles government led by Gustave Paul Cluseret, who had fought with Giuseppe Garibaldi and had been a general in the Union Army. The National Guard came under fire from Fort Mont-Valérien, broke ranks, and fled back to Paris, pursued by the French Army. Afterwards, Cluseret resigned and was replaced by Colonel Louis Rossel; but Rossel resigned on 9 May. He was replaced by Louis Charles Delescluze, an attorney and journalist with extensive political experience, but had no military experience. Delescluze was the civilian delegate of the War Committee, which effectively made him the military leader of the Commune.

In the weeks before the Bloody Week, the French Army was reorganized and vetted for loyalty. Soldiers suspected of sympathies to the Communards were transferred to other regiments, and often sent to French outposts in North Africa or regions distant from Paris.

On 8 May, the French Army occupied Fort d'Issy, a key defense south of the city, and gradually began digging trenches and fortifications closer to the city, until they were only a hundreds meters from the city walls and prepared for long siege. On Saturday, 20 May, the army began a bombardment of the western gates and the city, particularly the Port de Saint-Cloud.

The National Guard considered themselves safe within the ring of ramparts and fortifications that surrounded the city. On 20 May, a concert was held in the Tuileries Garden to raise funds for widows and orphans, though the Versailles artillery could be heard from the army positions outside the city.

== Sunday, 21 May ==
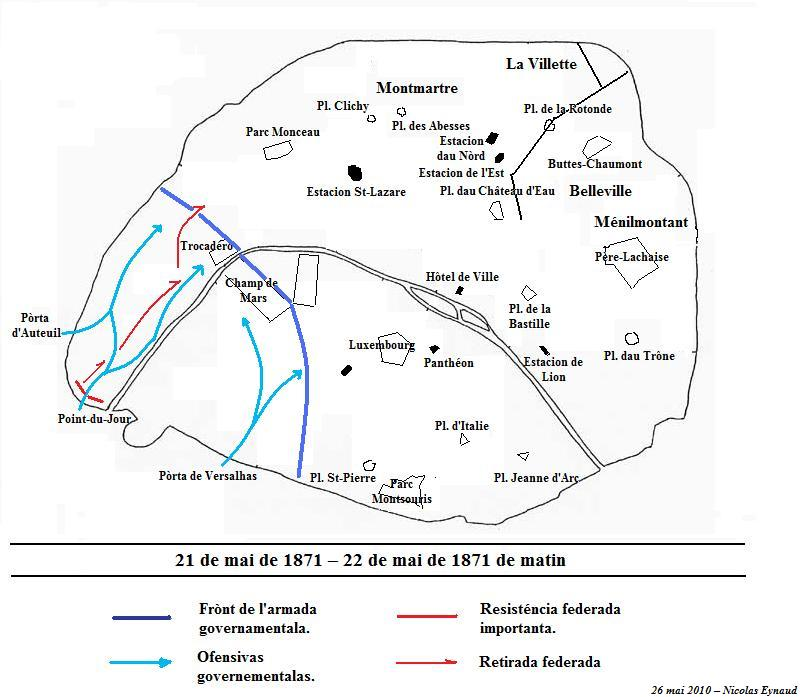
Troops of General Douay entered Paris through the Point-du-Jour rampart, which had been left undefended.

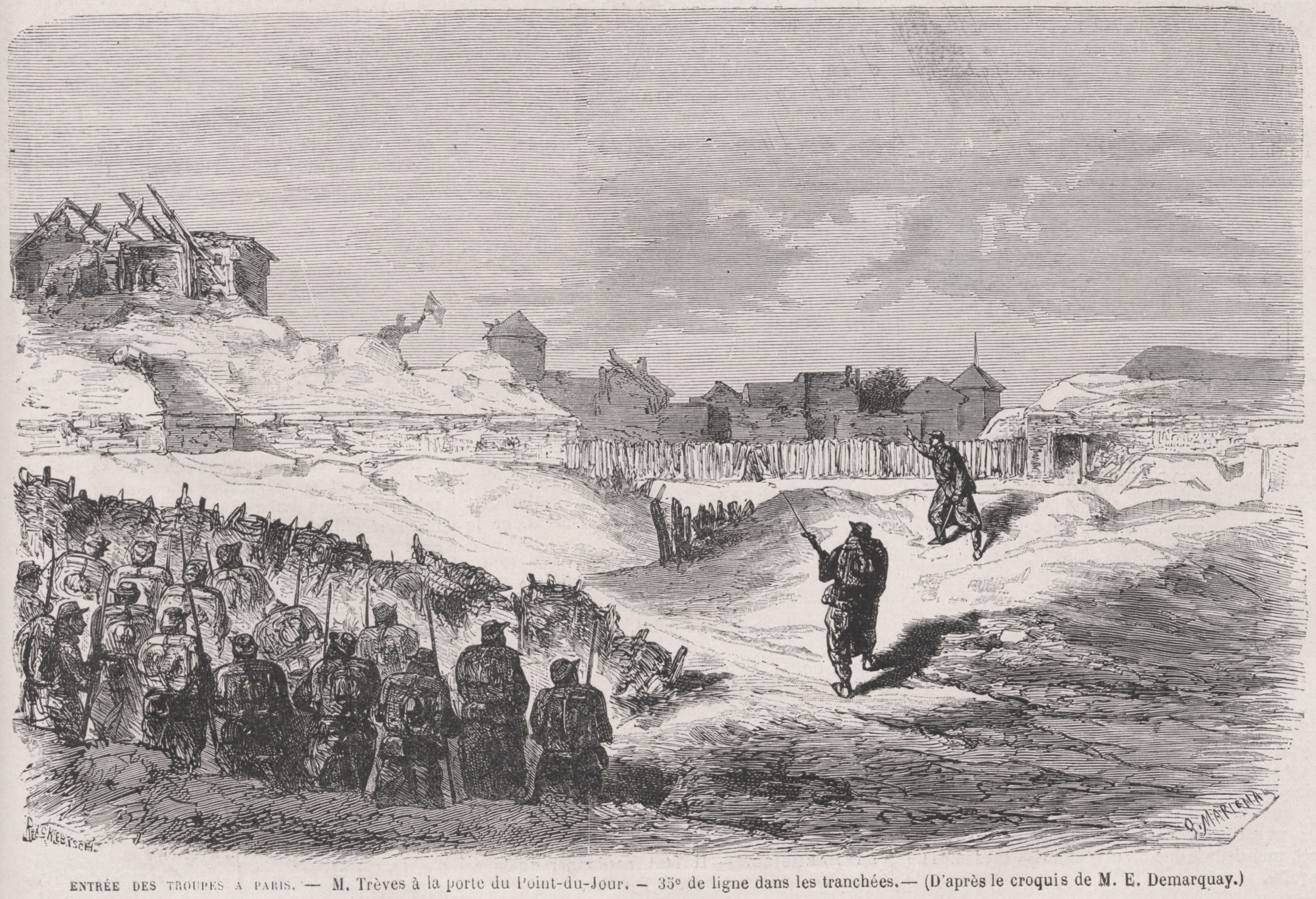
Army units enter Paris at the undefended rampart of Point-du-Jour.

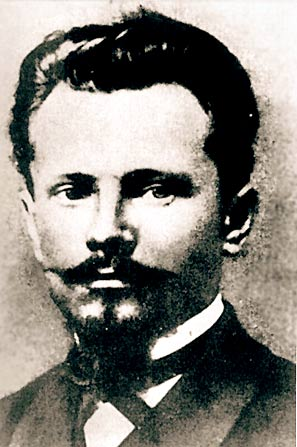
Jarosław Dąbrowski, Polish nobleman and Commune military commander

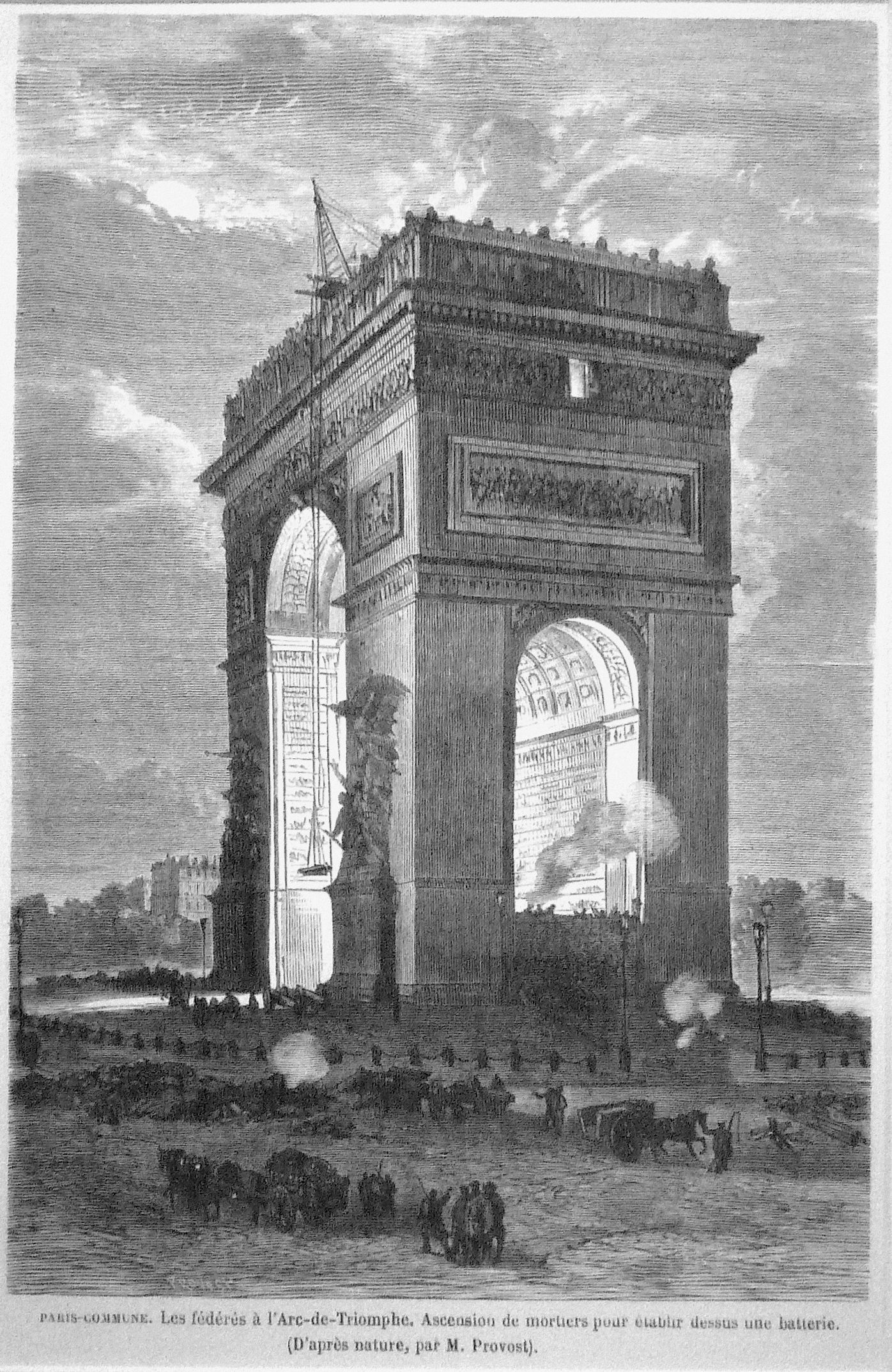
A National Guard artillery battery atop the Arc de Triomphe

On the afternoon of Sunday, 21 May, despite the sound of artillery bombardment from the Versailles batteries outside, a charity concert to raise funds for orphans and war victims went ahead in the Tuileries Garden, and attracted some eight thousand people. It was originally planned for the Place de la Concorde, but was moved to the Tuileries because of the bombardment. At the end of the concert, the master of ceremonies promised that the Versailles Army would never enter the city, and that another concert would be held at the same site the following Sunday. But by the following Sunday, the Commune no longer existed.

As the week began, there were two governments of the Commune; the Central Committee, which claimed control over the National Guard, and the Committee of Public Safety, also claiming responsibility for the defense of the Commune. The Commune forces on that day on paper amounted 200,000 men, but in reality there were no more than 60,000 ready combatants, under several different commands. There were a host of independent units, such as the "Zouaves de la Republique", and the "Lascars de Montmartre", which did not answer to the central command. The artillery also considered itself a separate branch, not under Commune army command

In the early afternoon of 21 May, an agent of the Versailles government forces, camped just outside the walls, explored the neighbourhood near the Point du Jour rampart, and saw that the rampart was not manned by Commune troops. General Félix Douay telegraphed Marshal MacMahon and the high command, and the army immediately began moving troops through the gap into the city.

General Jarosław Dąbrowski, the Polish nobleman and Commune commander of that sector, was at his headquarters at the Château de la Muette. When he learned of the intrusion, he quickly notified the Commune Minister of War and the Commune leader, Delescluze, asked for reinforcements, and announced he would make a counter-attack 1900. Delescluze, however, refused to recognise that the Versailles forces were already in the city, and refused to make any such public announcement. By the evening, the French army had consolidated its positions, and a large force was already inside the city. Dąbrowski's counter-attack failed, and then Dąbrowski disappeared for hours and was rumoured to have been killed. The Commune government did not announce the entry of the French Army until the following morning, by which time the army was solidly established within the city.

Once inside the city, the Army spread out and captured two major city gates, the Port d'Auteuil and the Port de Versailles from behind. By the late afternoon, sixty thousand Army soldiers were inside the city. Passy and the Trocadéro were quickly occupied. By the end of the day, the Army had reached the Champs de Mars.

As word spread that the Army was already within Paris, the National Guard began to react. The defense of the city was the responsibility of two separate organisations, the Committee of Public Safety (which took its name from the committee that had conducted the Reign of Terror during the French Revolution) and the Central Committee of the Commune. There was no centralized military leader, with each neighborhood having its own commander, and no comprehensive plan for the defense of the city.

The major defensive activity of the Commune, following the model of the 1848 Revolution, was the construction of barricades. The most imposing barricade was erected on the Rue de Rivoli at the entrance of the Place Saint-Jacques and the corner of Rue Saint-Denis to protect the Hotel de Ville, the headquarters of the Commune. It was six meters high and several meters deep, built of paving stones, with a protective ditch and sheltered firing positions. Similar barricades had been or built or were begun on Place Saint-Jacques, rues Auber, de Châteaudun, Faubourg Montmartre, Notre-Dame de Lorette, at the Trinité, La Chapelle, Bastille, Buttes Chaumont, boulevard Saint-Michel, and at the Panthéon. Others were begun along the length of boulevard Saint-Michel and rue Saint-Jacques. The defenders soon ran into a new problem. The Committee of Artillery of the Central Committee argued about which positions had the greatest need for cannons. As a result, many of the barricades were never finished or fully armed.

Once the Army entered Paris, several factors worked against the Commune. The wide boulevards were not conducive to defensive urban warfare, while the decentralized nature had no structure for joint action between the forces of the different neighborhoods. Each part of the city was entirely on its own. The French Army had superiority in numbers, command, and equipment. By the end of the first day, the Army had occupied a large part of the west of the city, as far as the Champs de Mars and the Trocadéro.

== Monday, 22 May ==
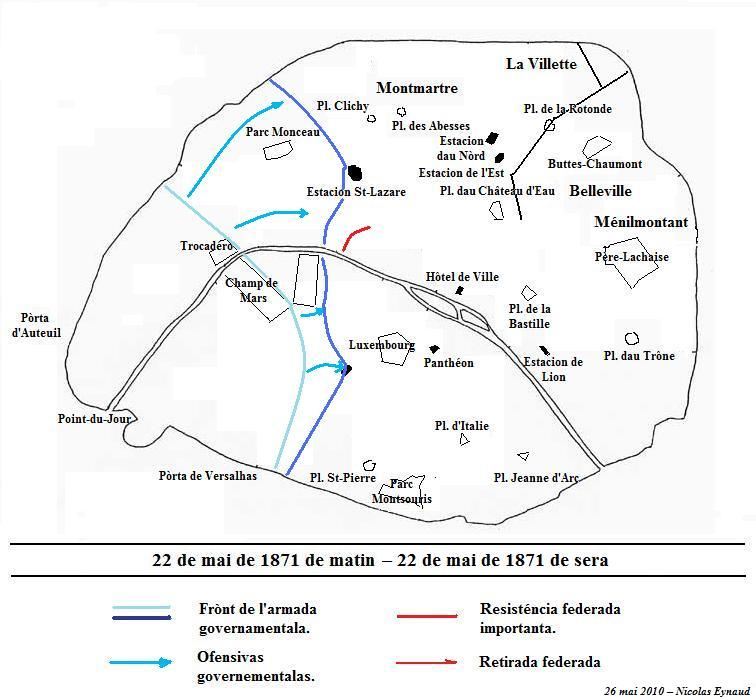
On May 22, the Versailles Army advanced east toward the center of Paris.

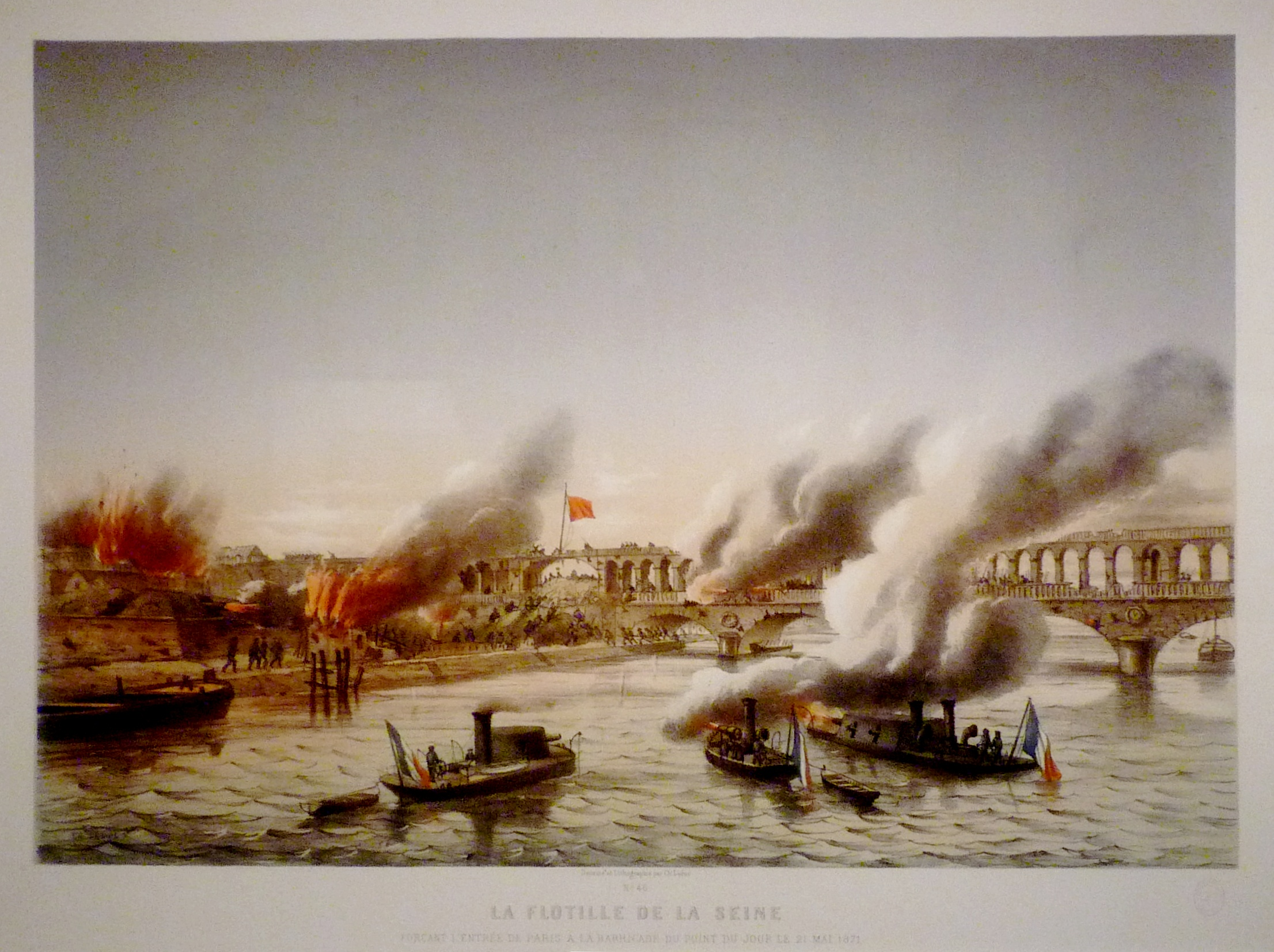
The Versailles Army enters the city via the Porte de Saint Cloud, pushing east.

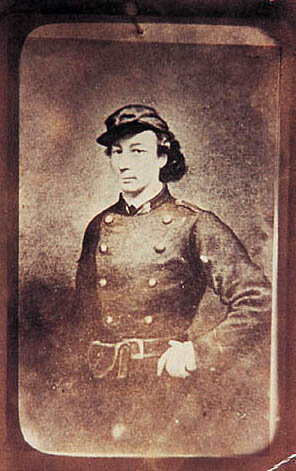
Louise Michel, one of the female soldiers of the Commune, in her uniform

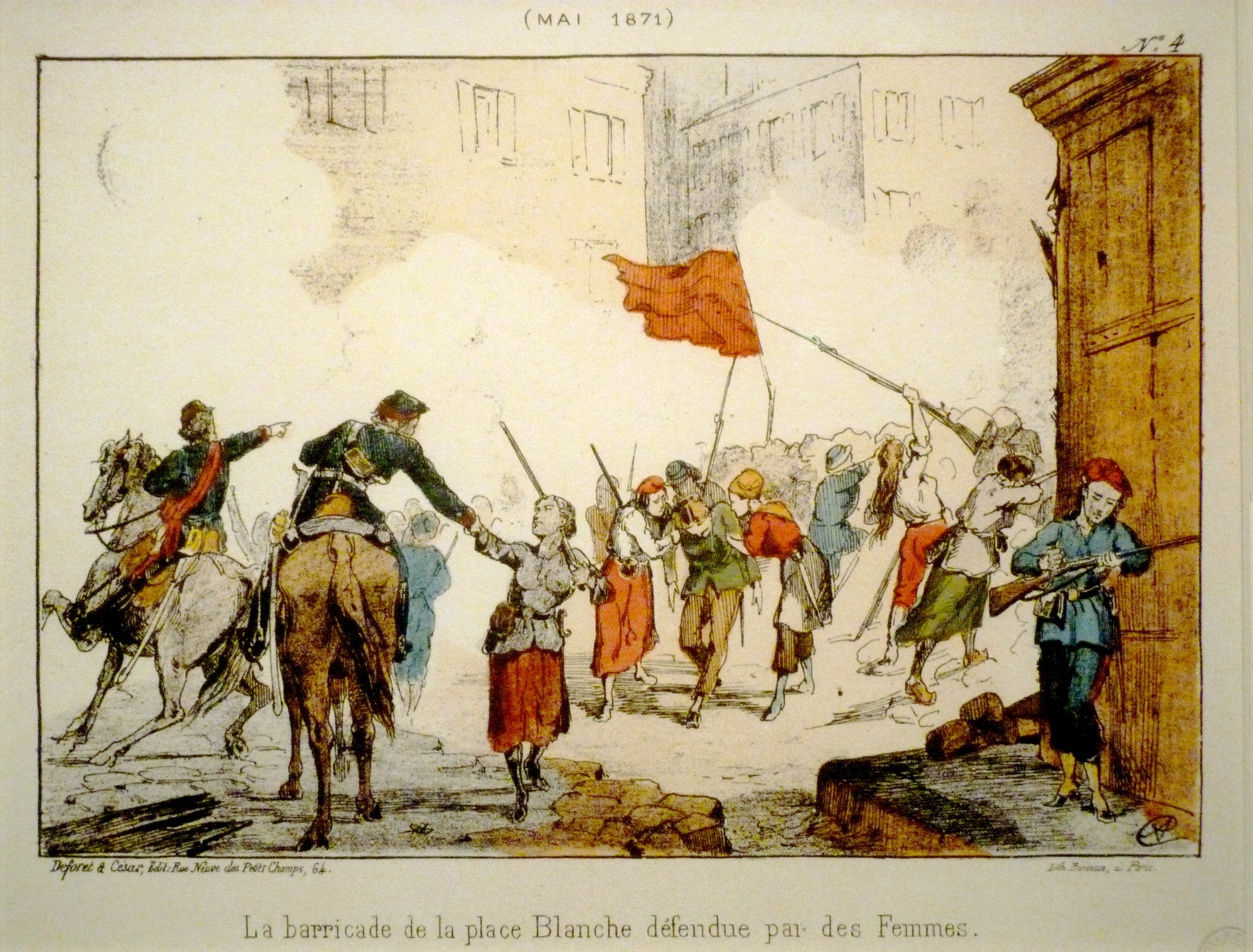
Commune barricade with female soldiers at Place Blanche

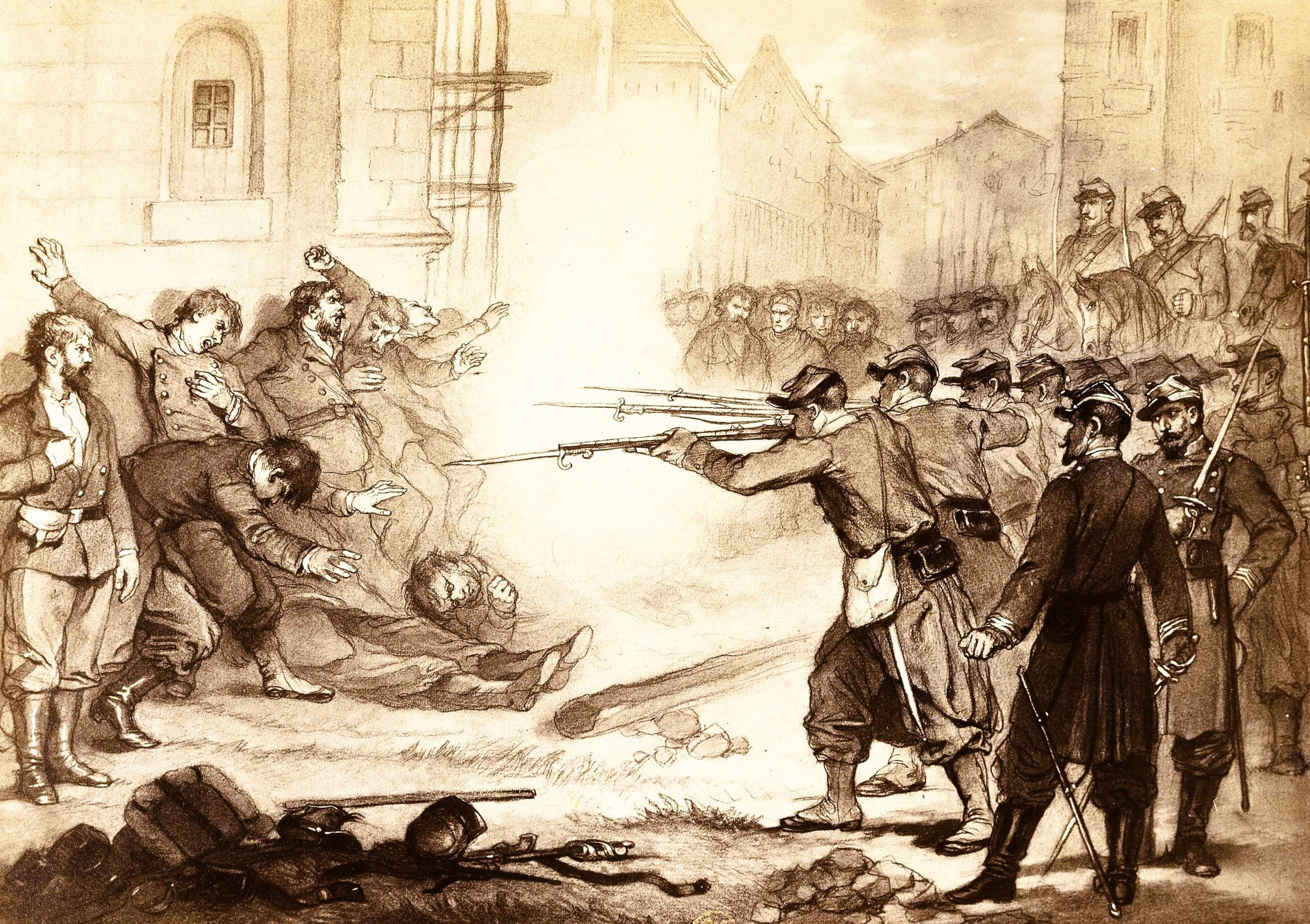
Execution of Communards by Versailles troops

By 9:30 a.m. on Monday the 22nd, fifty thousand French Army soldiers were already in Paris. General Ernest Courtot de Cissey, commander of one wing of the French Army, established his headquarters at the École militaire.

At the Commune headquarters, the alarm was not formally sounded and bells rung until early Monday morning. Louis Charles Delescluze issued a proclamation calling on Parisians to rally to the defense of the city. The proclamation had the opposite of the intended effect. Instead of joining together into a single force, the battalions dispersed, each to defend its own neighborhood. Many men who were formally members of the Guard stayed home. A women's battalion had been created, which included the activist and future anarchist Louise Michel, and was assigned to defend the Square des Batignolles, Place Blanche, or Place Clignancourt. Other than the soldiers of the National Guard, few Parisians were armed and prepared to fight.

Following the entry of the Army into Paris, the Commune soldiers abandoned the Ministry of War, which was near the new front line. They failed to take away or burn the records and documents of the Commune armed forces, which gave the Versailles government the names and history of all the Commune soldiers.

Only a few barricades were already in place, notably on the Rue Saint-Florentin, the Avenue de l'Opéra, and the rue de Rivoli. The National Guard began to build new ones; some nine hundred barricades were built hurriedly out of paving stones and sacks of earth. Residents of the neighbourhoods prepared shelters in the cellars. The first serious fighting took place on the afternoon of the 22nd with an artillery battle between French Army batteries on the Quai d'Orsay and National Guard batteries on the terrace of the Tuileries Palace.

On 22 May, the first documented executions of National Guard soldiers by the French Army inside Paris took place at Parc Monceau. Fifteen men and one woman captured in combat were shot after the battle. The practice of shooting prisoners was not consistent or universal. Some units never shot prisoners, other shot prisoners immediately, and in later battles some units handed over prisoners to military courts.

Once the Versailles army entered Paris, it was soon overwhelmed by the large numbers of Commune prisoners it captured. Different commanders had different practices. In some units, Commune prisoners who were captured holding weapons, or with their hands darkened by gunpowder, were shot immediately. Commune soldiers who were foreigners, or who had deserted from the army, were also likely to be shot immediately. Most prisoners were transferred to military tribunals for trial.

Military tribunals were created at the headquarters of each army corps and division. Tribunals met at the Ecole Militaire, Parc Monceau, the Luxembourg Palace, Place Vendôme, the Gare du Nord, the city halls of the First and Fifth Arrondissement, the Panthéon, the École des Arts et Métiers, and other locations,

Following their trials, those who were sentenced to death were taken immediately to nearby execution sites; these included the construction site for the Gare du Nord, the esplanade in the Tuileries Garden the Luxembourg Gardens, Place du Châtelet, the Mazas Prison and later, as the army moved east, the Père Lachaise Cemetery.

By the evening of the 22nd, the Army had reached the Gare Saint Lazare and the Place de la Concorde, and had occupied the Gare Montparnasse. General MacMahon established his headquarters near Trocadéro. The head of the Versailles government, Adolphe Thiers, entered the city and visited MacMahon at his command post that afternoon.

The Polish nobleman Jarosław Dąbrowski was a senior military commander of the Commune, but rumours had spread that he had received a large bribe in exchange for surrendering the city to the Army. His advice and commands were largely ignored. At ten o'clock in the evening, a group of Commune officers escorted Dąbrowski to the Hôtel de Ville to turn him over to the Committee of Public Safety. Dąbrowski had dinner with a group of officers, who did not believe the rumors, and reentered combat.

== Tuesday, 23 May ==
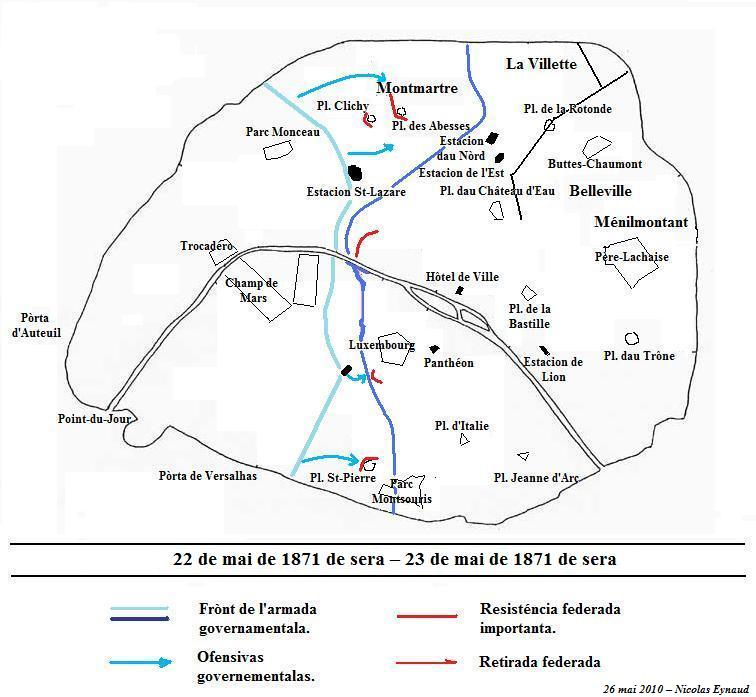

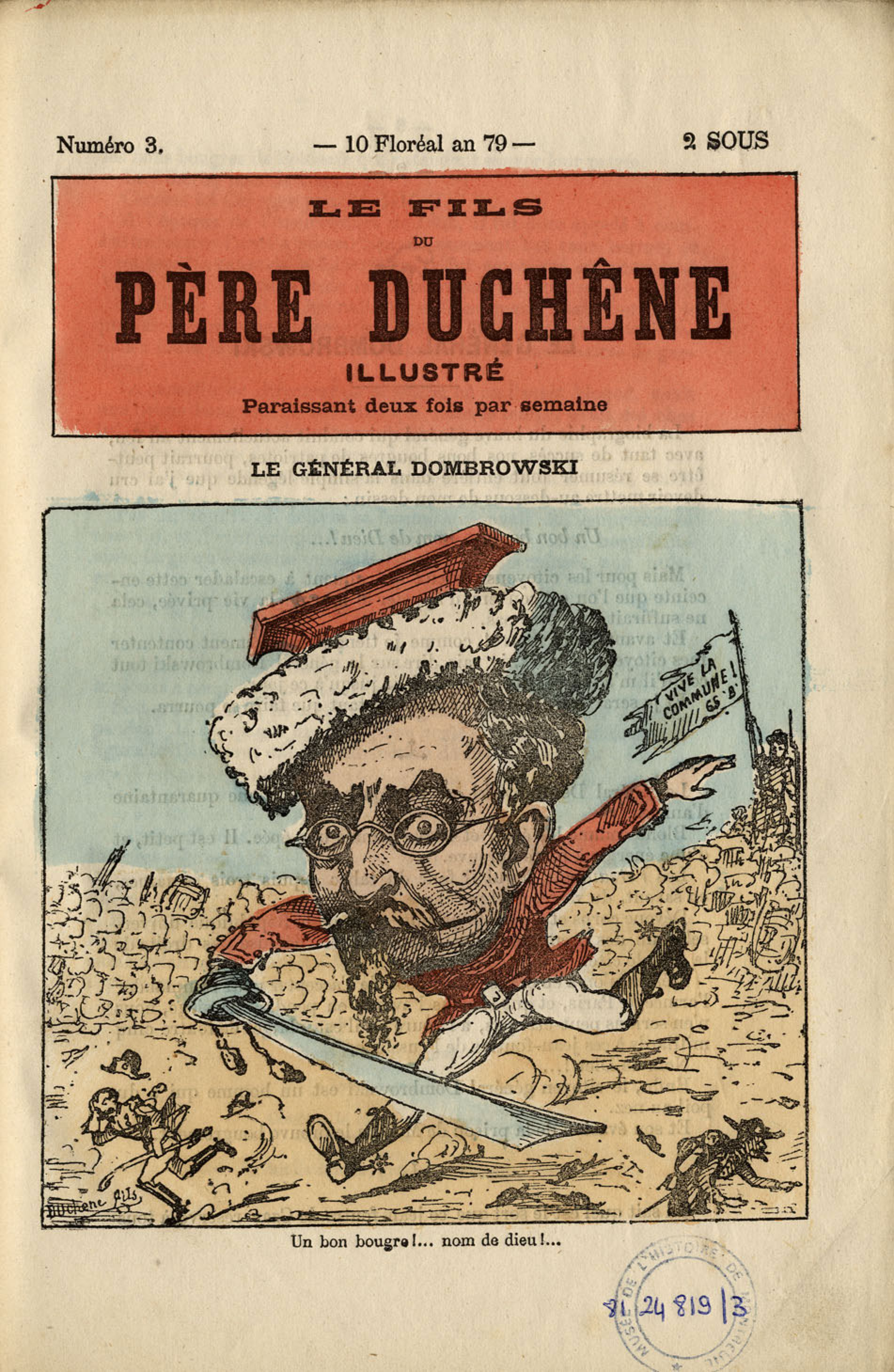
Commune cartoon from May 1871 depicting Jaroslav Dombrowski chasing away the Versailles Army

On the 23rd, the Commune built or strengthened barricades by pulling up the paving stones of the Paris streets. Early in the morning, the French Army resumed its offensive toward the east. The army had learned important lessons in street fighting during the 1848 French Revolution, particularly the way to overcome barricades. Instead of attacking them head-on, the army moved slowly and systematically, tunneling through walls of buildings around the barricades and positioning soldiers on the upper floors of buildings to fire at the barricades from above. In most cases, the barricades that were outflanked were quickly abandoned. The National Guard also tried the same strategy but lacked the tools and manpower to tunnel through interior walls.

The strongest resistance against the French Army on the 23rd was in Montmartre, where the Commune had originally been launched. Extensive barricades had been built at Place Blanche and at Place Saint Jacques. A large number of cannons had been captured by the National Guard from the army at Montmartre at the beginning of the Commune, and they were still there, but without ammunition. Commune soldiers at Place Clichy and Place des Abbesses were able to repulse several attacks by the army, but the Imperial German Army, which controlled the zone outside the city walls, allowed the French Army to move troops along the city walls to outflank the Commune forces. Pleas for reinforcement and munitions for Montmartre were sent to the Commune headquarters at the Hôtel de Ville, but Montmartre received no reinforcements or ammunition; each neighbourhood was left to defend itself. By the end of the day, the army effectively controlled half the city, along a line from Montmartre in the north to Parc Montsouris in the south.

Jarosław Dąbrowski went to the most violent fighting, where he was fatally wounded. He died in the ambulance taking him back to the command center. His last reported words were, "Do they still say I was a traitor?"

In the evening the National Guard adopted a new tactic; they began setting fire to the government buildings they still controlled, beginning with the Tuileries Palace. A group of arsonists spread through the building, soaking the interior with oil, and setting it on fire. The buildings set on fire by the Commune, besides the Hôtel de Ville and Tuileries Palace, included the Palais de Justice (which was also damaged on the outside by artillery fire from the French Army) the Ministry of Finance, the Cour des Comptes, the Palais de la Légion d'Honneur, the Gobelins Manufactory, the Palais d'Orsay. and the commercial piers along the Seine.

== Wednesday, 24 May ==
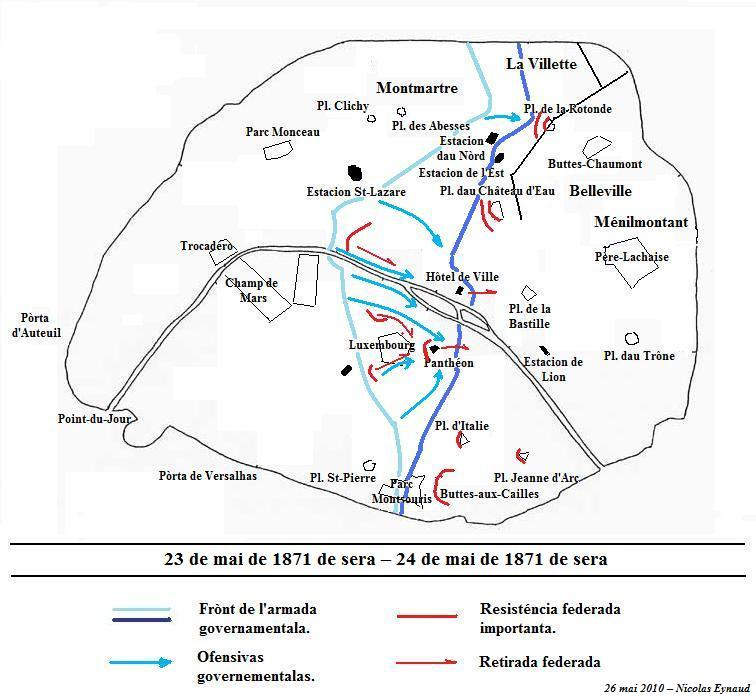
By the end of the 24th, the French Army had captured Montmartre.

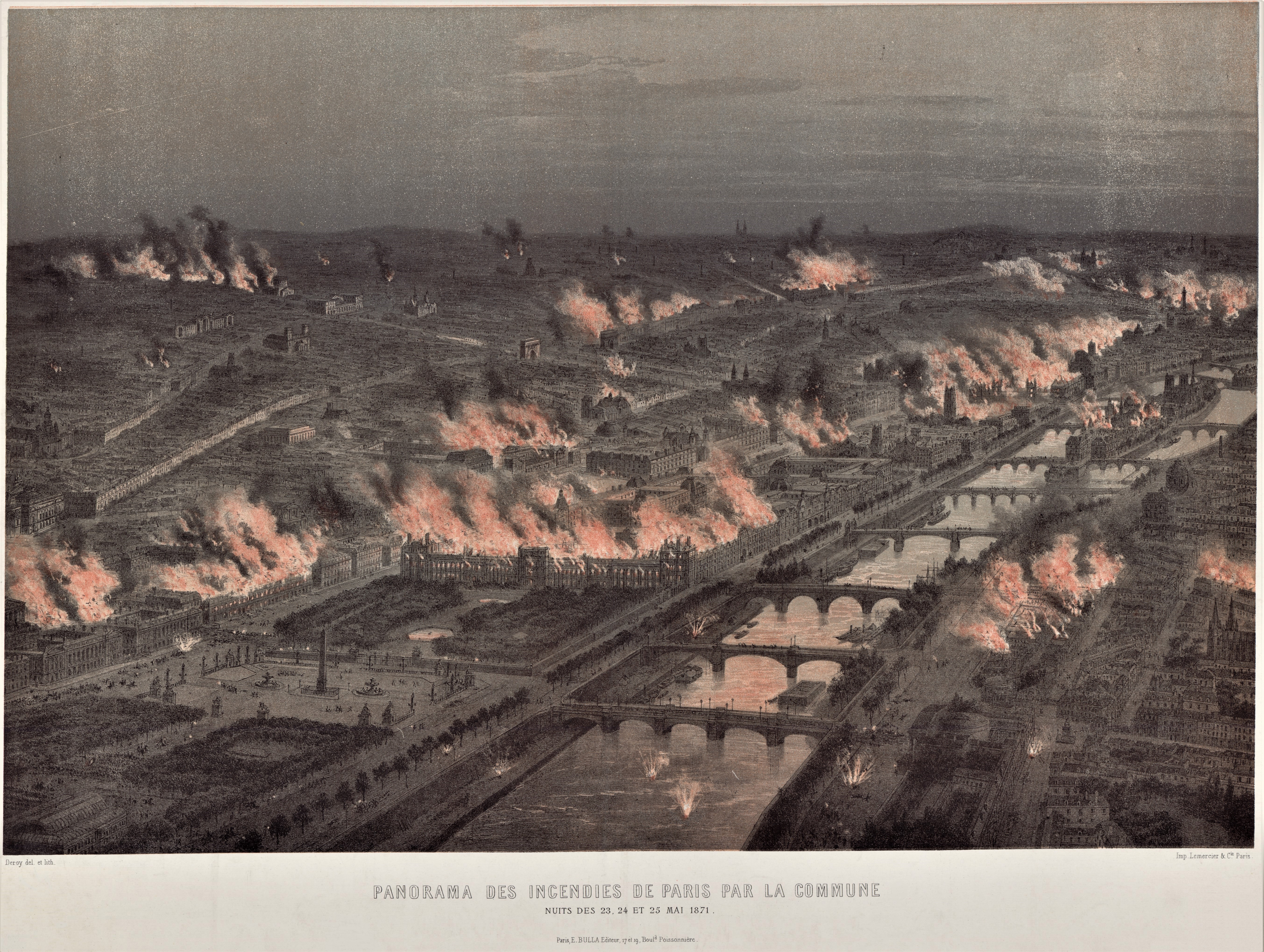
Fires were set by the Commune at Tuileries Palace and surrounding buildings on the night of May 23–24.

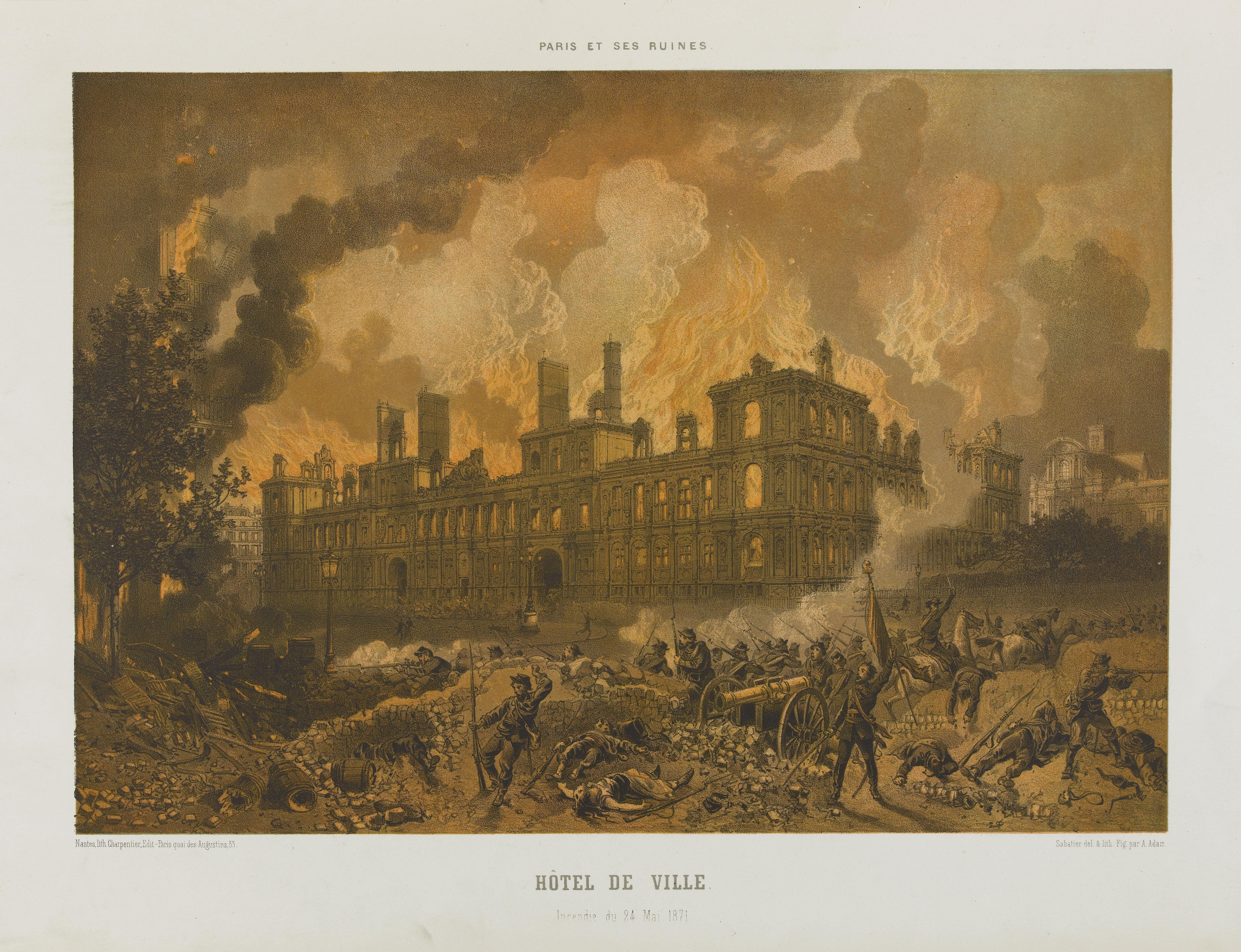
Fire at City Hall, attacked by Versailles troops

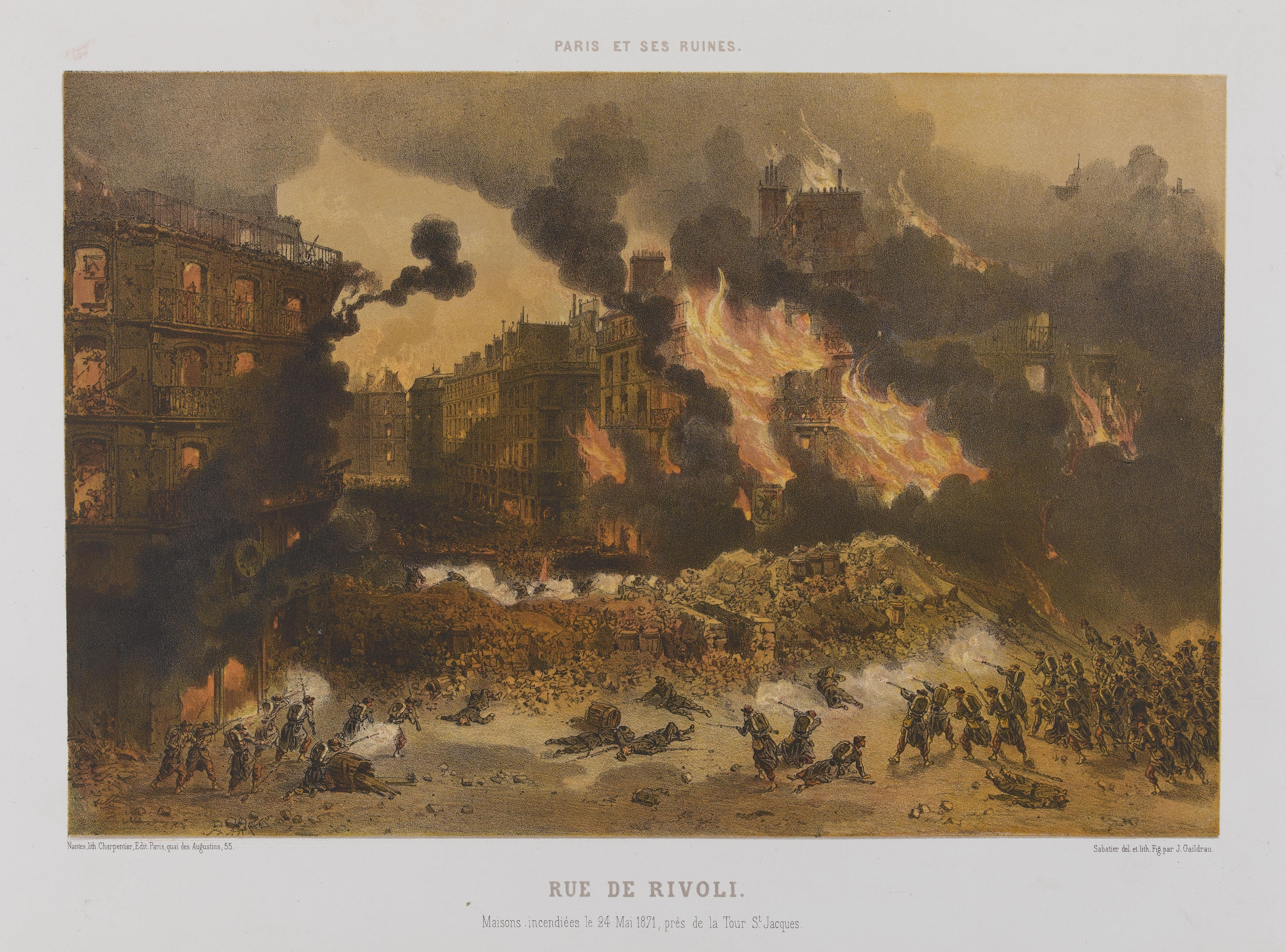
Barricade fighting on Rue de Rivoli. In reality, the French army very rarely made frontal attacks on barricades. Most were outflanked from the rear or sides.

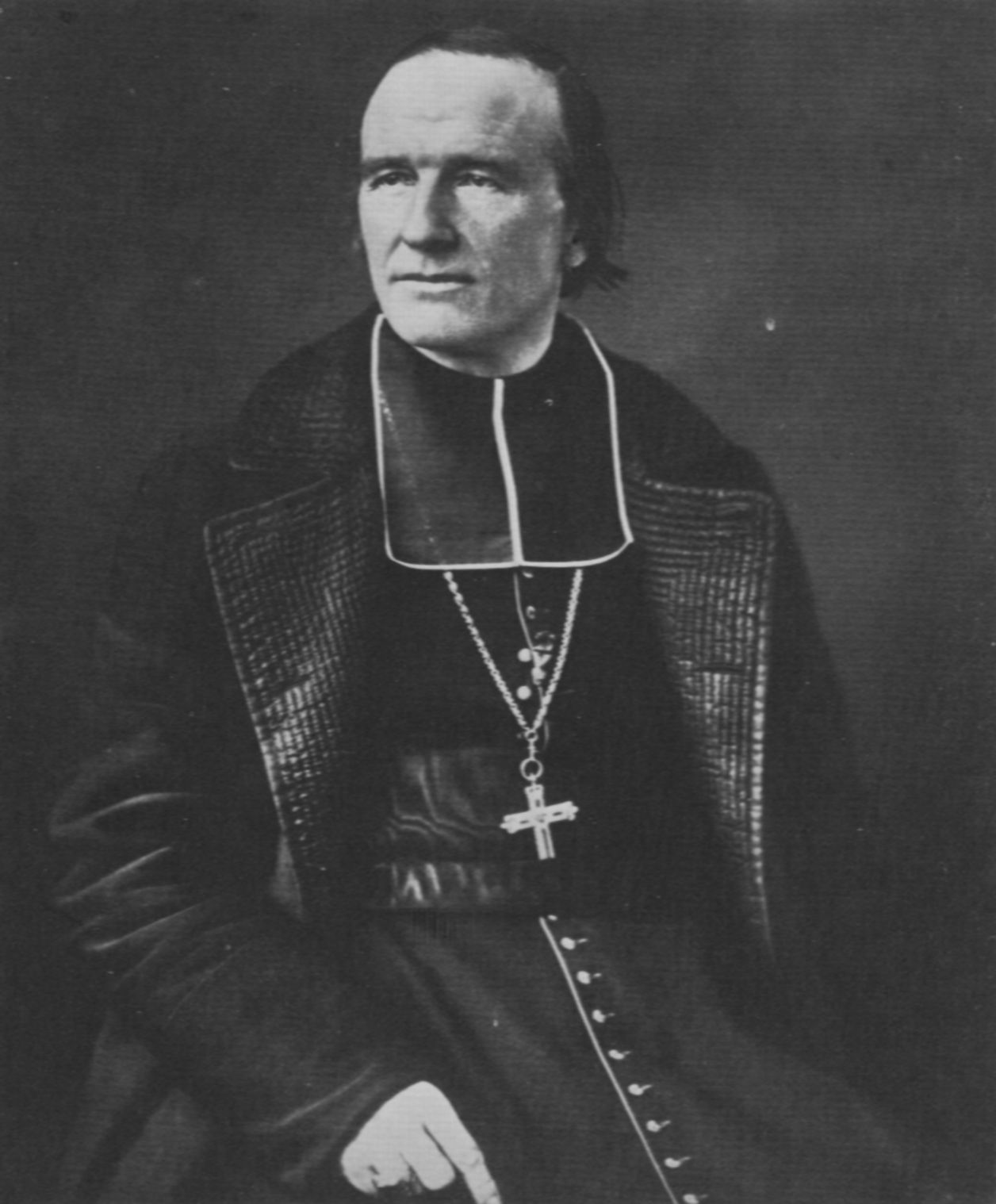
Georges Darboy, Archbishop of Paris, executed with five other hostages by a Commune firing squad on 24 May

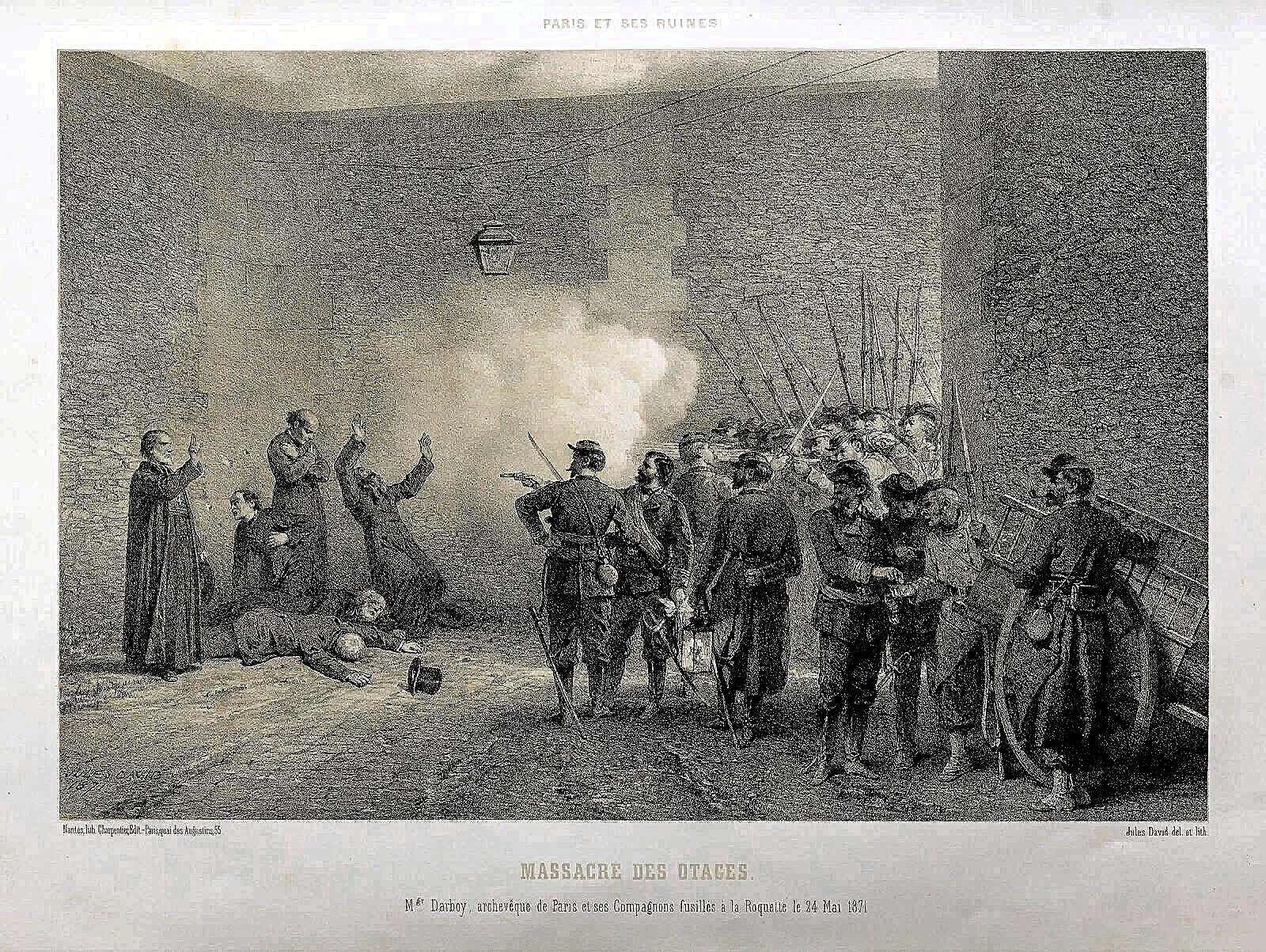
Execution of Archbishop Darboy and other hostages

Early in the morning on the 24th, the Commune leaders abandoned their headquarters at the Hôtel de Ville and moved to the city hall of the 11th arrondissement. They set fire to the hôtel, gutting the structure and destroying city archives and property records stored inside. This left the Commune without a central command post.

National Guard soldiers began preparing a bonfire inside Notre-Dame de Paris to burn the cathedral, following the example of the Tuileries Palace and other government buildings. At three in the morning, an official arrived from the Commune headquarters. He pointed out that a fire in Notre-Dame would set fire to the neighbouring Hôtel-Dieu Hospital, which held eight hundred patients. The fire was put out and the cathedral was evacuated, and spared from bombardment through the rest of the Commune.

The Commune Central Committee issued a peace offer for delivery to the Versailles military headquarters. They proposed the dissolution of both the Commune and the National Assembly, the withdrawal of the army from Paris, the election of new governments in the large cities, and a general amnesty. This was posted on the walls of Paris still controlled by the Commune. The army headquarters ignored the peace offer and continued to move through Paris.

A delegation led by Gustave Genton, a member of the Committee of Public Safety, went to the new headquarters of the Commune at the city hall of the 11th arrondissement and demanded the immediate execution of the hostages at the prison of La Roquette. The prosecutor of the Commune, Théophile Ferré, drafted an order to execute six hostages. Genton went to the prison and was given a list of hostages from which he selected six names, including Georges Darboy, the Archbishop of Paris, and three priests. The governor of the prison refused to give up the Archbishop without a specific order from the Commune. Genton sent his deputy back to Ferré, who gave the order for the execution. Archbishop Darboy and five other hostages were taken out into the courtyard of the prison, lined up against the wall, and shot. After the end of the Commune, Ferré was singled out for prosecution because of his order, and was one of two dozen Commune leaders who were executed.

Archbishop Darboy’s remains were found with in a common grave with the other executed hostages. His remains were transferred to Notre-Dame Cathedral, where his tomb can be seen today.

== Thursday, 25 May ==
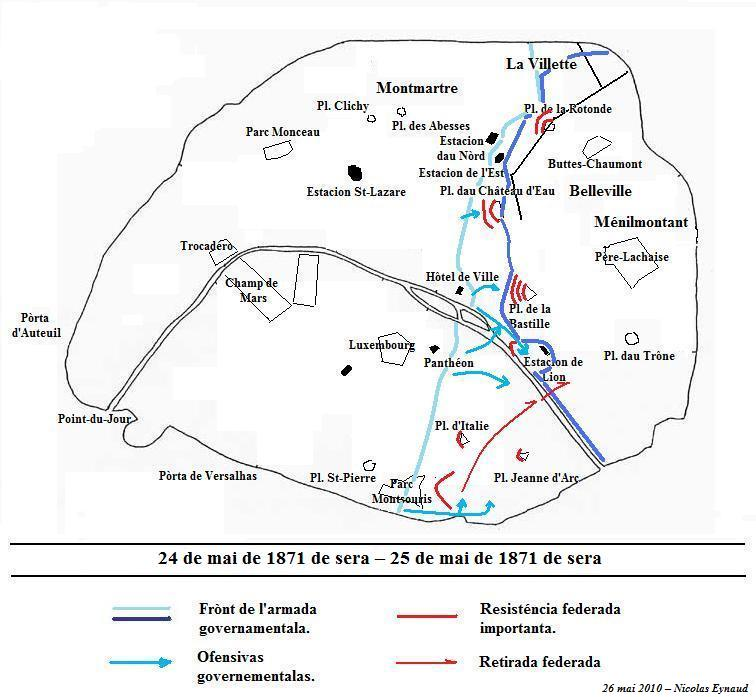
By the 25th, fighting had moved into the east end of the city.

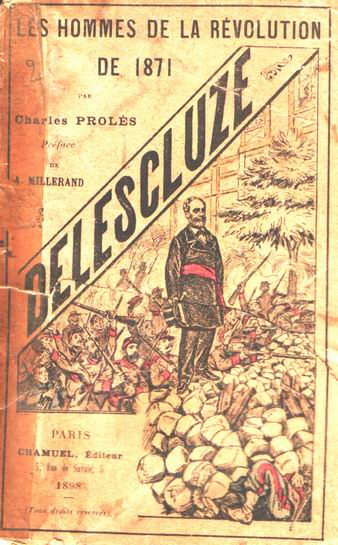
Representation of the death of Louis Charles Delescluze

By the morning of Thursday, 25 May, the entire western portion of the city was controlled by the French Army. During the night before, the National Guard, who were overstretched, had withdrawn from their barricades in the 10th arrondissement. By morning these positions were occupied by the Versailles troops. On the Left Bank, the French Army occupied the Jardin du Luxembourg. A force of National Guard counterattacked in Asnières and Neuilly, pushed back the French Army and captured three cannons.

On the Right Bank, the French Army continued to move forward. In a short time the army captured the ruins of the Hôtel de Ville, and moved on toward the Place de la Bastille, the central strong point of the Commune lines. Instead of attacking the barricades directly, the French Army spread out and worked their way through the narrow streets around it, tunnelling through walls and outflanking the Commune positions. The French Army pushed along the avenues toward the Place d'Italie via Avenue d'Italie and Avenue de Choisy, which were blocked by massive barricades. The National Guard created a distraction by setting fire to the Gobelins tapestry factory, but the Versailles soldiers bypassed the barricades by moving through neighborhood gardens. By this means they were able to outflank the Communard position at the Butte-aux-Cailles. The Commune soldiers captured a group of a dozen Dominican monks who were fleeing the city, and later shot them.

At the southern edge of the city, the National Guard still held two forts, Montrouge and Bicêtre, which prevented the Army from encircling the National Guard in the south. The garrisons of the two forts decided to abandon them to return home and defend their own neighbourhoods. Without waiting for approval, they spiked the cannons and departed. The forts were quickly occupied by the Army, who brought their own cannons and began to bombard the Communard positions at Fort d'Ivry and Butte-aux-Cailles.

By the end of the day, the Army controlled the entire Left Bank. The main Communard force was able to escape to the Right Bank via the Pont d'Austerlitz. The new front lines were at the Place de la Bastille and the Place Château d'Eau, where fighting took place on the barricades.

Delescluze and the remaining Communard leaders had moved their headquarters to the city hall of the 13th arrondissement on Boulevard Voltaire, but it came under attack from the army. The Army encircled and captured the Arts and Métiers School, along with other key positions. The front line moved to the barricade at the Château d'Eau.

At about 7:30 in the evening, Delescluze put on his ceremonial sash as the chief executive of the Commune and walked to the barricade at the Place Château d'Eau. He climbed up to the top of the barricade, in clear view of the Army, and was shot dead.

== Friday, 26 May ==
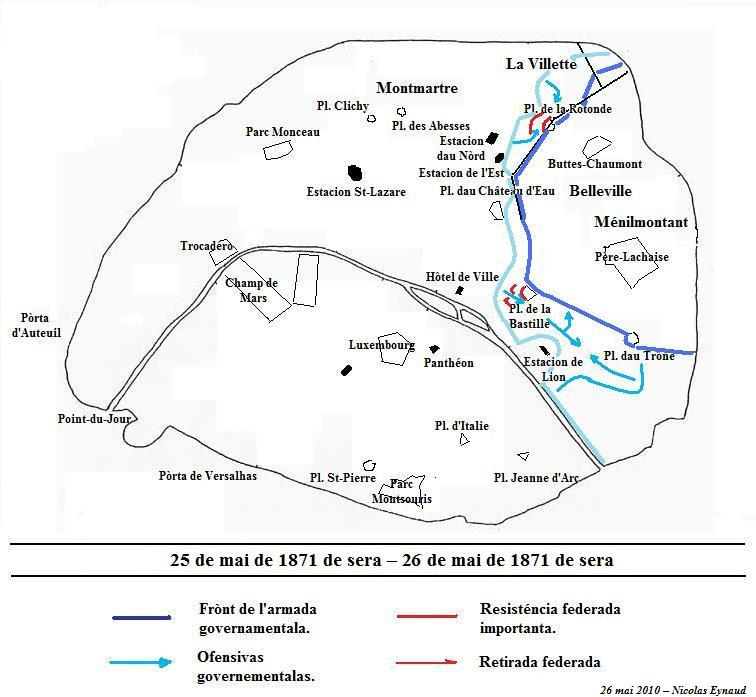

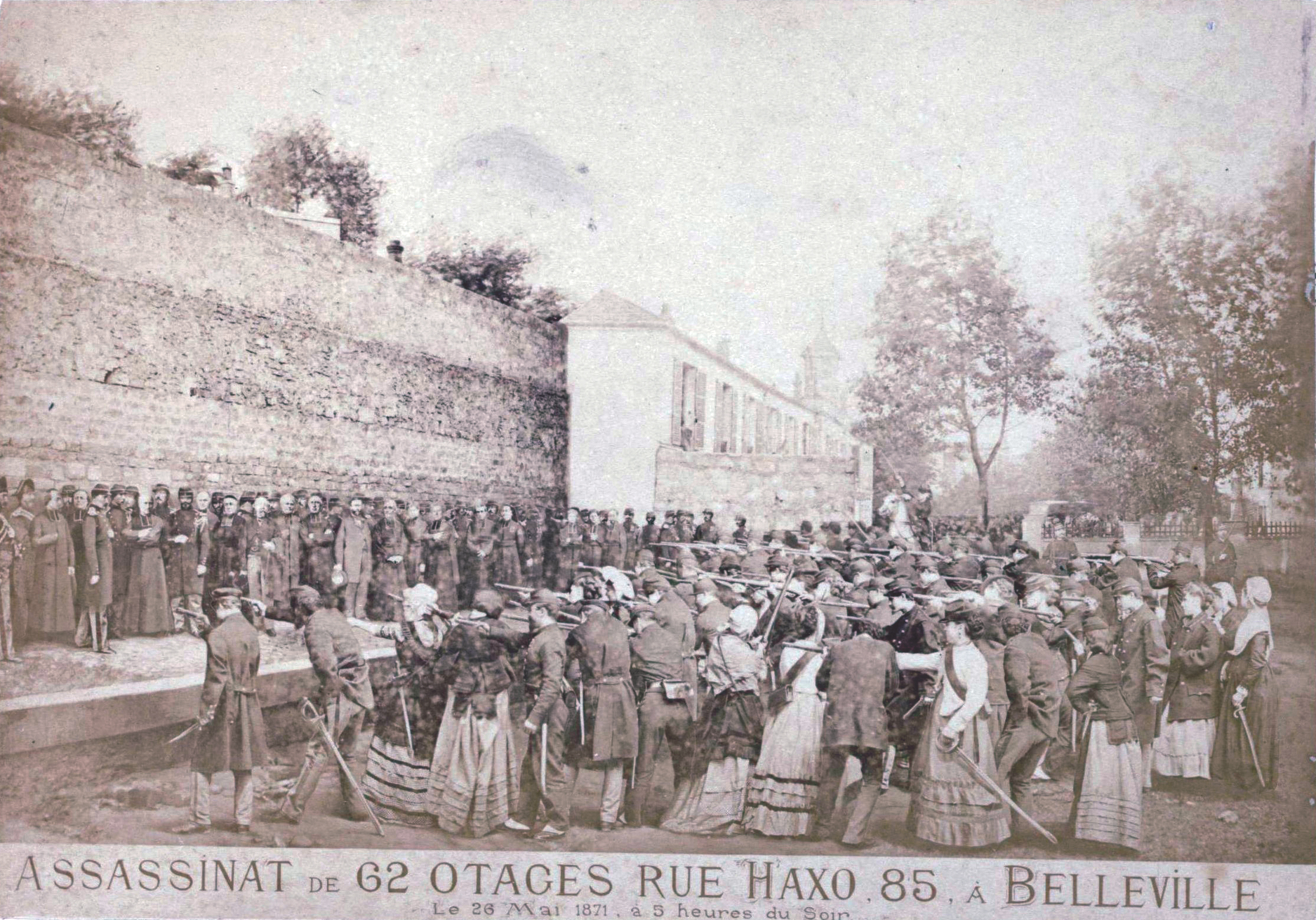
Montage of the execution of sixty-four hostages by the Commune at Rue Haxo

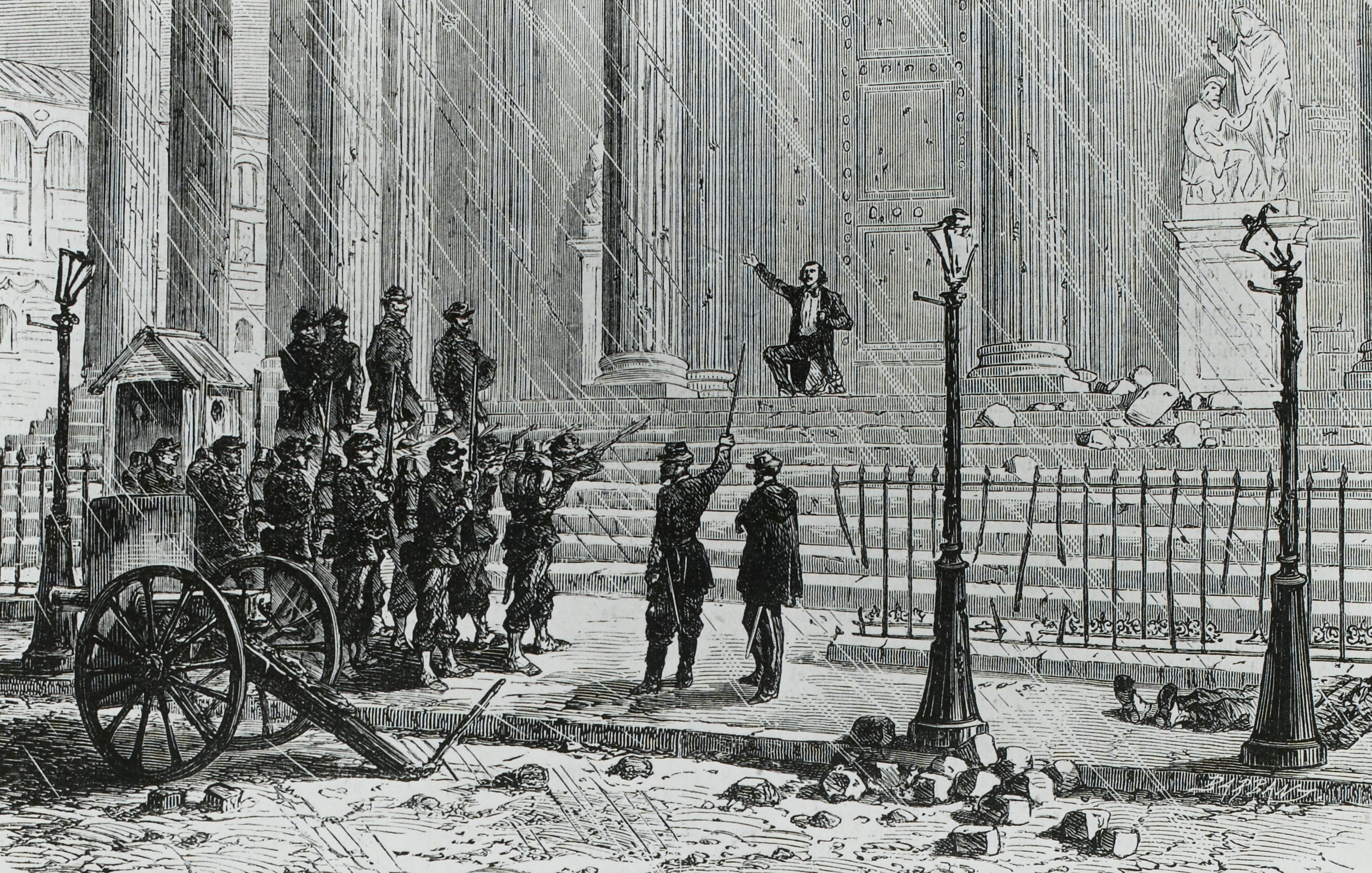
Execution of the journalist Jean-Baptiste Millière by the Versailles troops, on the steps of the Pantheon

During the night of 25–26 May, the Versailles army occupied several strategic points abandoned by the Commune, including the barricade on Rue Saint-Antoine, the Gare de Lyon railway station, the Mazas Prison, the Square du Temple, and boulevard Voltaire. The fighting resumed at seven o'clock on Friday morning under heavy rain. The Commune strong points were the barricades at the Place de la Bastille and the Place de la Rotonde in the northeast. As on previous days, the army did not directly attack on the barricades, but methodically worked its way around them. The National Guard resisted fiercely, particularly on the Faubourg Saint-Antoine, but the French Army bombarded them heavily. The barricades were gradually outflanked, and the Place de la Bastille was taken by the French Army at about two in the afternoon. Place de la Rotonde was later outflanked by the Army on both sides. The French Army artillery was positioned on the heights of Montmartre and coordinated their fire with the troops below. The National Guard tried to resist the advancing army, but there was no communication or coordination between the units and the Commune artillery.

In the afternoon, a dozen members of the Commune Central Committee held a meeting at Rue Haxo in the 20th arrondissement. The Committee drafted a proclamation calling upon the citizens of the arrondissement to aid the National Guard in the neighbouring 19th arrondissement in expelling the Army. It was the last proclamation issued by the Commune.

At six in the evening, sixty-two or sixty-four hostages including clergymen and thirty-four gendarmes were collected by the Commune and brought to Rue Haxo near Belleville. An angry crowd gathered. The hostages were lined up against the wall and shot.

The remaining Commune soldiers were reinforced by retreating soldiers from other neighbourhoods, who occupied a group of barricades.

By the end of the 26th, the French Army had ended resistance on the Left Bank. The Commune-held area was limited to a semicircle in the northeast, including the Buttes de Chaumont and the Père Lachaise Cemetery. La Rotonde and Belleville were the remaining Commune strongholds.

== Saturday, 27 May ==
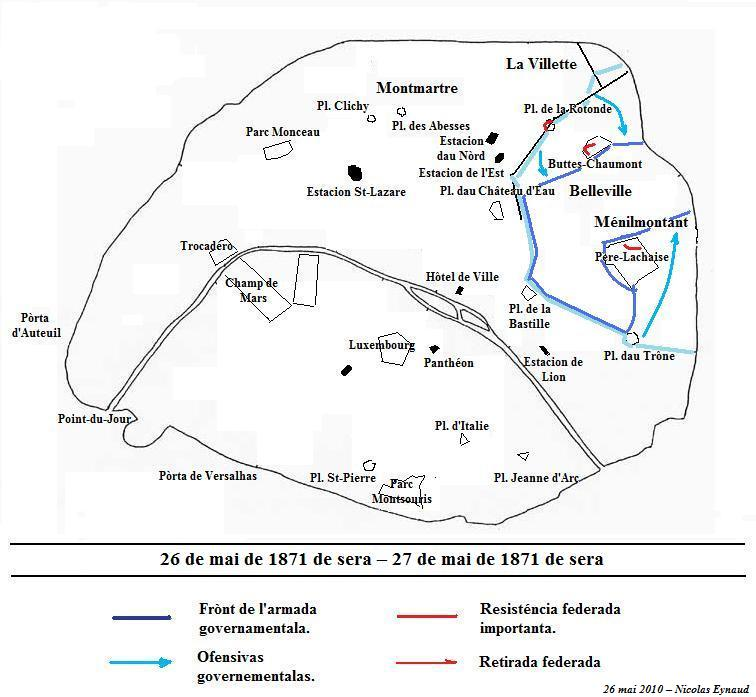

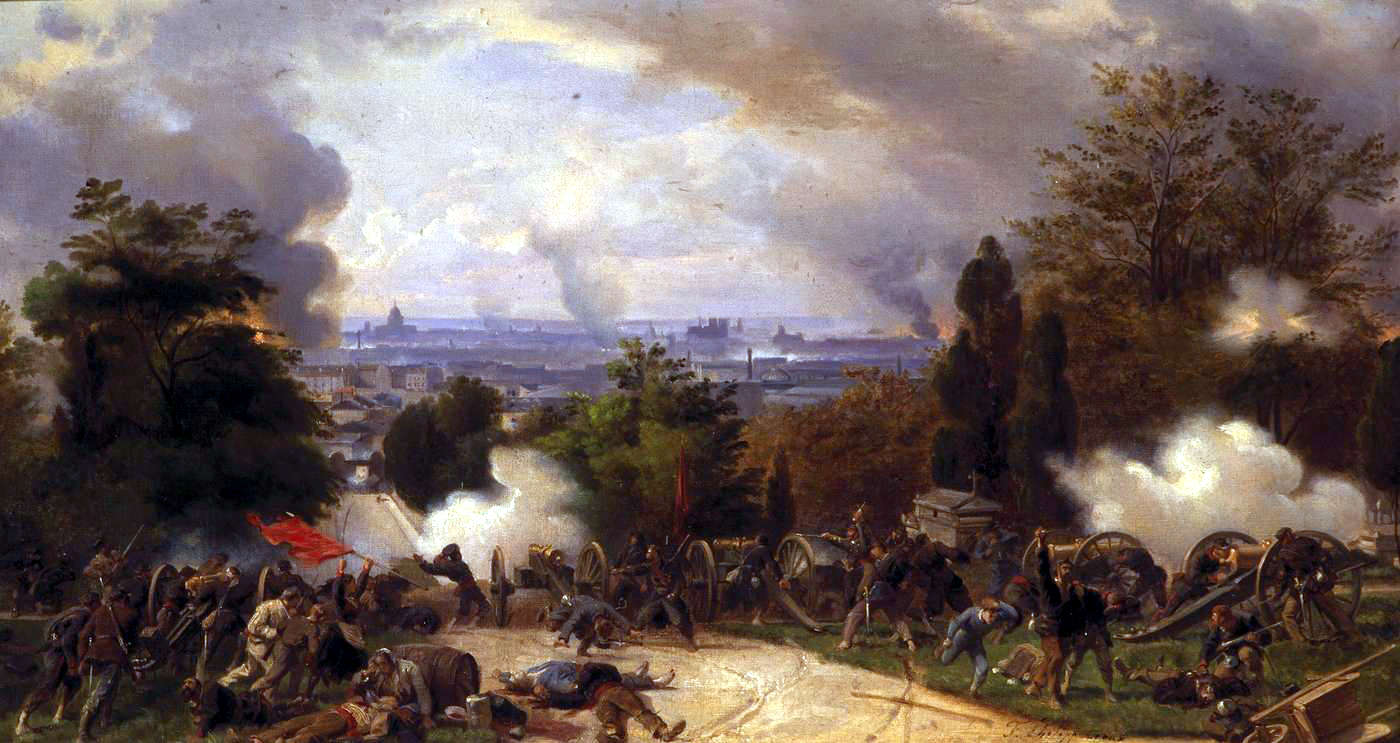
Fighting in Père Lachaise Cemetery

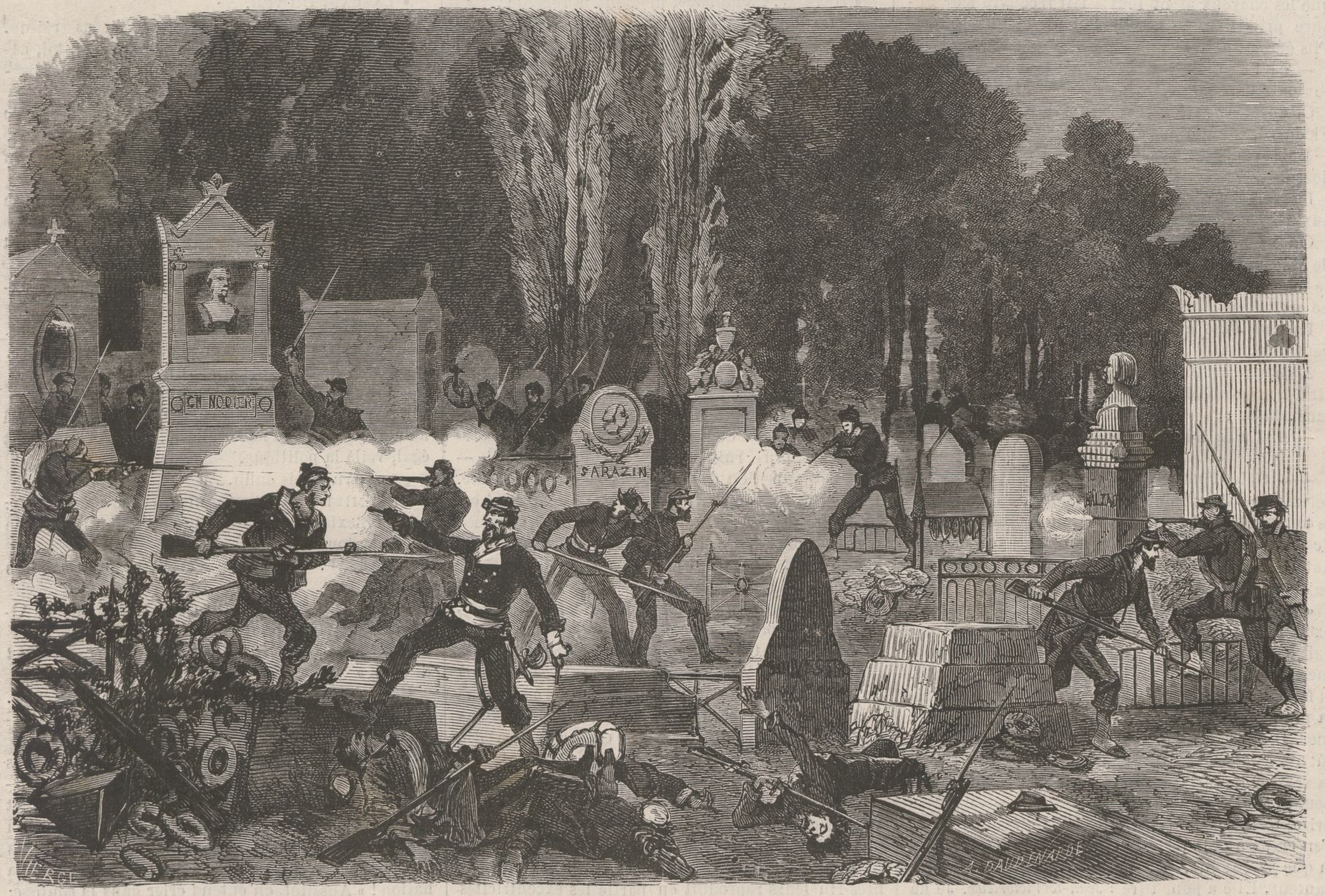
Fighting in Père Lachaise (Le Monde illustré)

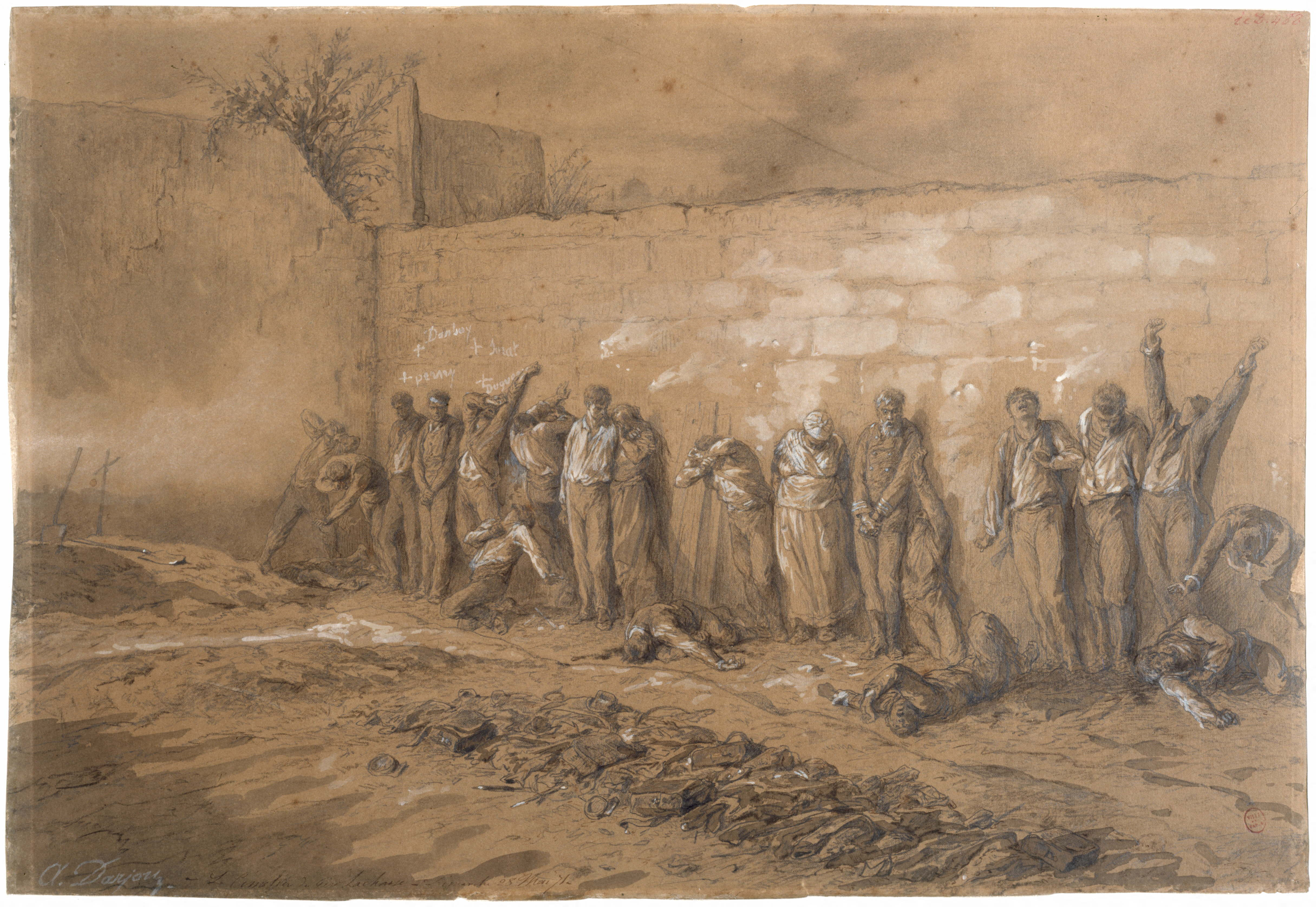
Execution of Communards

By Friday night, the area controlled by the Commune had been reduced to an area of the 20th arrondissement around the working class neighbourhoods of Belleville and Menilmontant The major defensive points were the Buttes-Chaumont, with hilly terrain and a network of former mines, and the Père Lachaise Cemetery. The north and eastern border of Paris was under Prussian occupation, who had reinforced their units, brought in artillery, and sealed off the border of the city. The National Guard could no longer enter the district from outside Paris or escape from the city.

The remaining members of the Central Committee of the Commune had moved to Belleville and began to give orders and directives to defend the neighbourhood. The National Guard still had a rectangle of barricades defending La Villette, Belleville, Menilmontant and Charonne, and controlling the grand boulevards. The wide boulevards built by Napoleon III gave the National Guard an advantage by creating clear lanes of fire. They also had batteries of artillery emplaced in hills at Buttes-Chaumont and Père Lachaise. There was nowhere the National Guard could retreat, so the fighting in this area was some of the most intense.

The strong defense of the 20th arrondissement caused MacMahon to modify his plan; he held back his forces in the south on the Canal Saint-Martin and shifted his major attack to encircle the remaining strong points in the northeast. Part of the French Army moved along the walls outside of the city to attack the National Guard from the rear. The Commune barricades on the Place de la Rotonde were encircled and forced to surrender. The army losses were twelve dead and forty-eight wounded.

The fighting resumed that night as Commune soldiers attacked north of Belleville and at Père Lachaise. The last units of the Commune were gathered on the streets around the boulevards of Belleville and Menilmontant and tried to push the French Army out of their positions without success. The Army closed in on them from three sides. The fighting continued through most of the night, but by morning the cemetery was still controlled by the Army.

The other Commune strong points also surrendered, with the French Army taking 1,500 prisoners on Rue Haxo, and two thousand prisoners near Père Lachaise. The prisoners were held for later trial.

One hundred forty-seven prisoners were taken by the army in the fighting at Père Lachaise. They were lined up against the wall of the cemetery and shot, then buried in common graves. A smaller group of about twenty officers of the National Guard was collected at Mazas Prison and La Roquette prison. They were given brief trials before a military tribunal, sentenced to death, and then delivered to Père Lachaise. There they were shot and buried in the same grave as the others.

== Sunday, 28 May ==
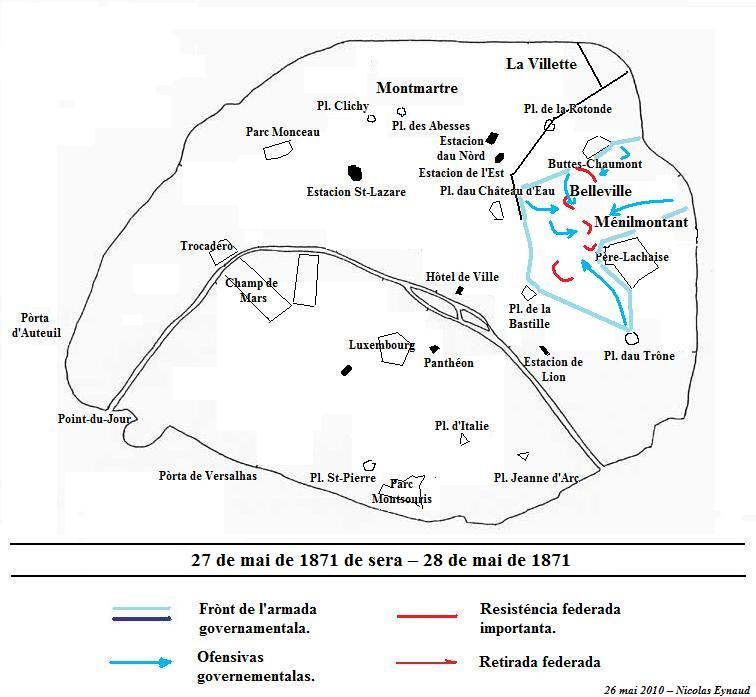
The last major fighting took place near the Père Lachaise Cemetery, the Buttes-Chaumont and Belleville.

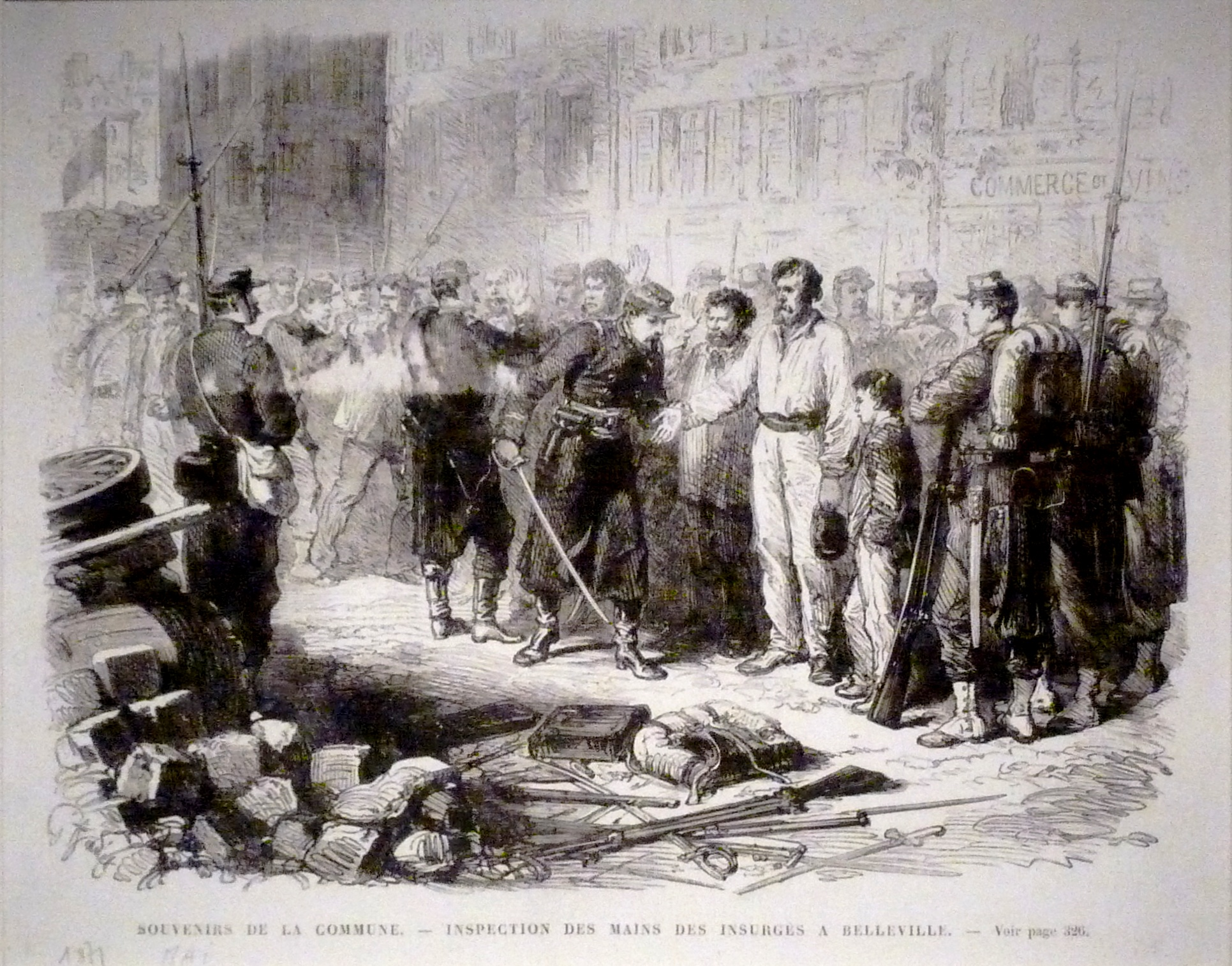
Soldiers check the hands of prisoners in Belleville to see if they had fired weapons.

Fighting continued around Belleville and Menilmontant and near Père Lachaise into the night of 27–28 May, but by the morning, the French Army had encircled National Guard forces by moving around the city walls, trapping the remaining soldiers. Commune units continued fighting on Rue Angoulême (now Rue Jean-Pierre Timbaud). The remaining Commune leaders were all trapped within this pocket: Jules Vallès at the bottom of Rue de Belleville, and Eugene Varlin and Theophile Ferré at the Faubourg-du-Temple. Outnumbered and surrounded, the remaining Communard soldiers continued to fire from the windows of the ruined buildings. The Army artillery on the heights above joined the battle, bombarding the remaining Communard positions. The barricade at the rue de Belleville was captured, and the National Guard there still holding weapons were executed. The National Guard fell back to another barricade on the Faubourg du Temple, then to rue Saint Maur, where they finally surrendered. The one-hundred fifty survivors were taken prisoner. Scattered fighting continued until the evening. A final barricade was captured at rue de Tortille at eight at night.

Fifteen hundred Commune prisoners surrendered on Rue Haxo. Two thousand more surrendered near Père Lachaise. At Place Puebla, another eight hundred negotiated their own surrender. These prisoners were spared, and were later marched to Versailles for trial. The Château de Vincennes was the last major outpost of the Commune to surrender. The Commune soldiers there were imprisoned, while the nine officers were tried and summarily executed in the moat of the château. Within Paris, the body of the Commune military leader, Delescluze, was recovered. General Douay gave instructions to place Delescluze's body in a common grave.

== Aftermath and legacy ==
Overall army casualties were light, since the army rarely directly attacked barricades, preferring to bypass them or and attack them from the sides or rear. The Second Division of the Fifth Corps of the French Army lost three soldiers on 22 May; six on 23 May; four on 24 May; then sixteen on 25 May, when they attacked the strong defenses of the Arts et Metiers quarter; three on 26 May, one on 27 May, and one on 28 May, the last day of combat.

Following the end of the fighting and throughout June, since the Commune had not destroyed the list of its soldiers, arrests were made on a massive scale. Most were quickly released, but many were held at the Camp de Satory at Versailles for trial, a process which took months. The army camps were moved out of the city, and contacts were restricted between Parisians and the army. The police took over responsibility from the army, and the army was withdrawn from the city.

On 3 June, General de Cissey was named the new Minister of War.

The wall of Père Lachaise where Communard soldiers were executed is now marked with a plaque to the victims of the Semaine sanglante, and is the site of annual commemorations of the event.

== Trials, executions, and eventual pardons ==
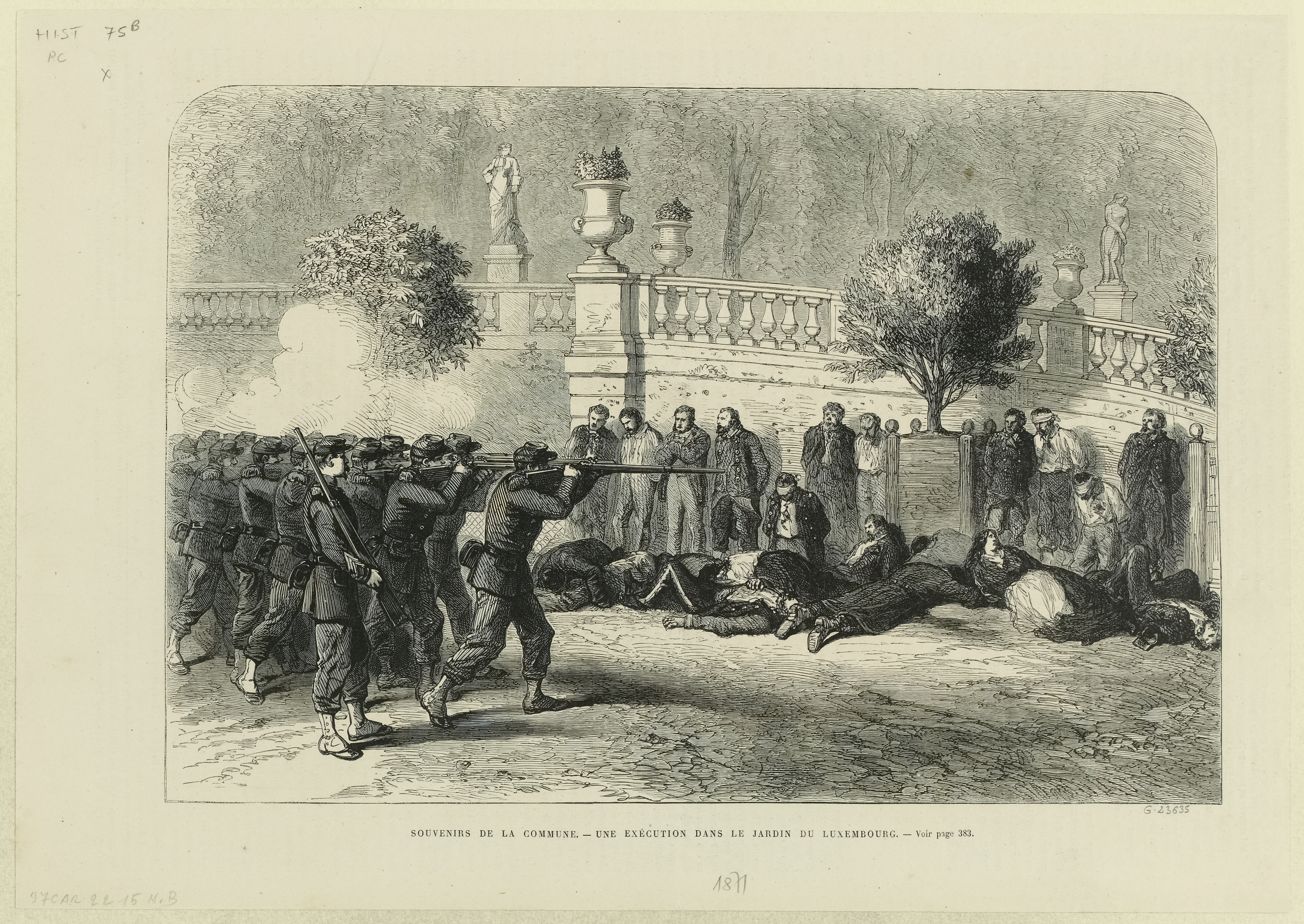
Execution of Commune prisoners at the Jardin du Luxembourg, 4 June 1871

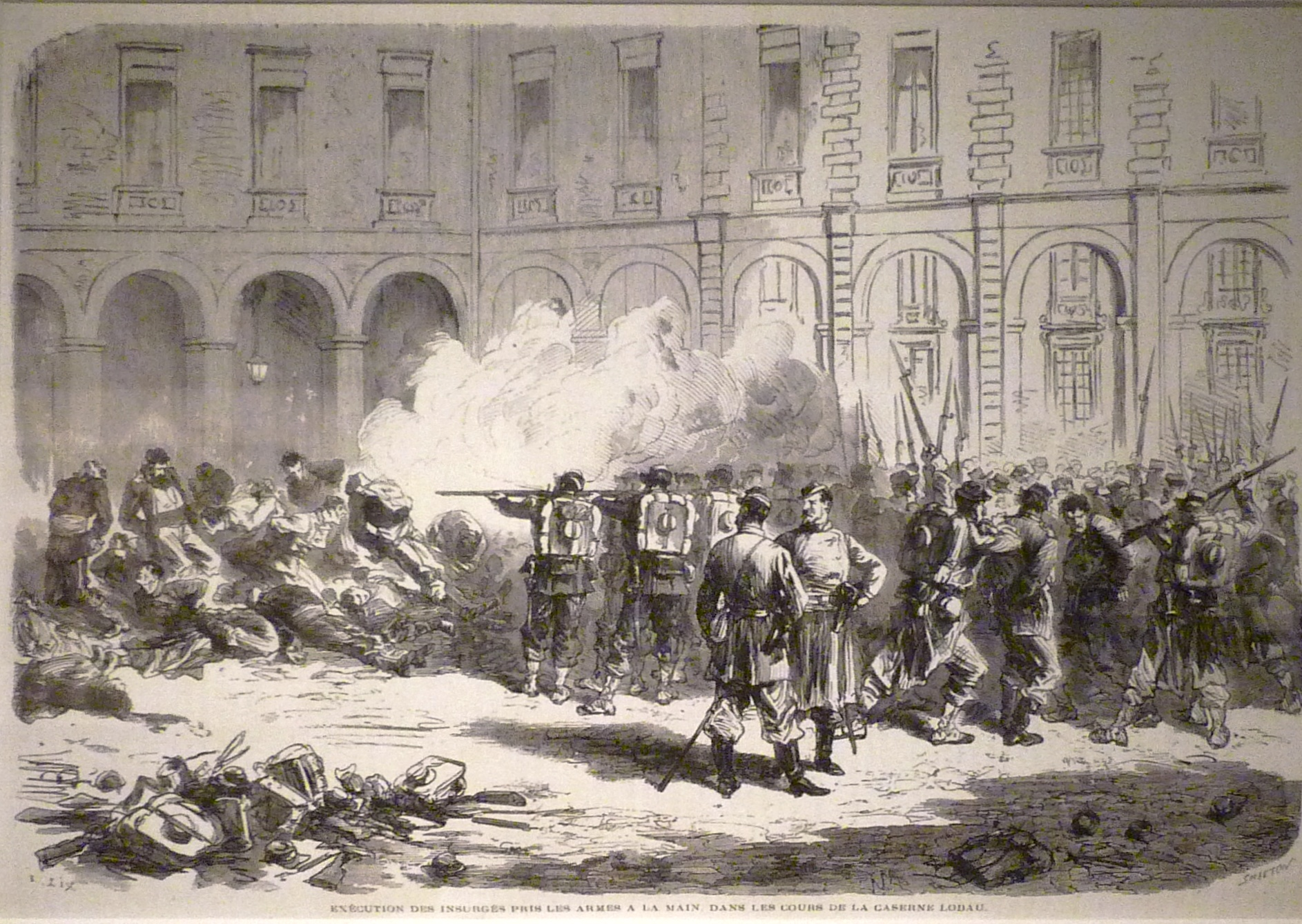
Execution of Commune prisoners at Lobau Barracks

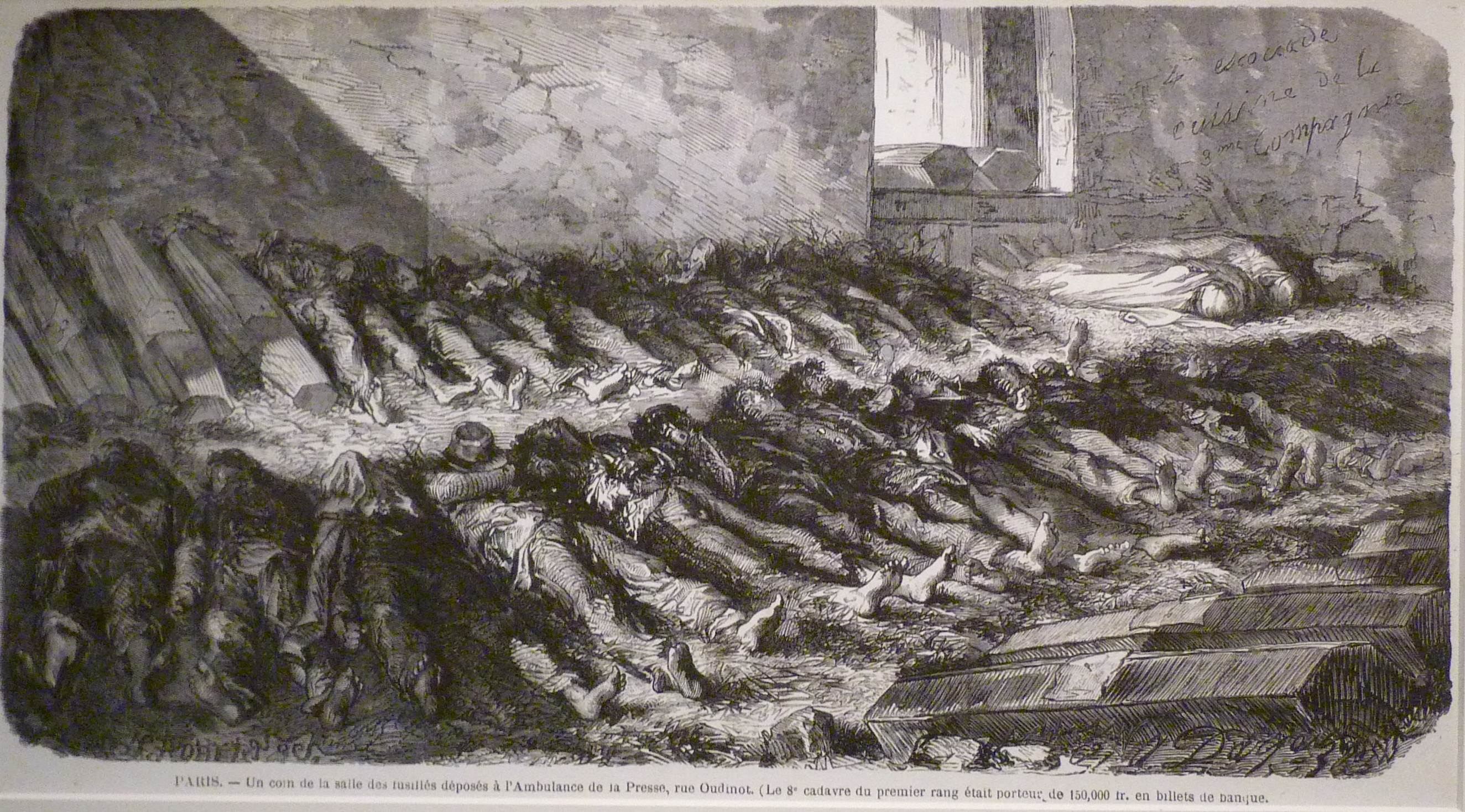
Bodies of shot Communards, on June 3, 1871

After the Semaine sanglante, the bodies of 8,509 Communard soldiers killed in the fighting were collected by city authorities for burial in city cemeteries. The largest numbers of registered graves of Communards in Paris are in Montparnasse Cemetery (1,644 graves), Montmartre Cemetery (1,245 graves), the Carrières d'Amerique (1,338 graves) and Père Lachaise (878 graves). The bodies of about eight hundred Commune soldiers, still in uniform, were found in 1897 in a common grave in Charrone cemetery in the 20th Arrondissement. A small number of additional unrecorded graves were found in later years during building excavations and the construction of the Paris Métro. Historian Robert Tombs concluded that a majority of the Communards that were killed were shot by firing squads after brief trials by military courts around the city.

Certain prisoners, especially deserters from the Army, foreigners, those captured with weapons, or those whose hands showed they had fired weapons were almost always executed. Adolphe Thiers and Marshal MacMahon both called for the sparing of soldiers who had not fired arms, but neither condemned the execution of soldiers who were armed.

The total number of Commune soldiers killed during the Bloody Week has long been a subject of controversy. It was estimated in 1879 by the radical socialist journalist Camille Pelletan at thirty thousand, and by the writer and former Communard Prosper-Olivier Lissagaray as over twenty thousand. It is estimated by more recent historians, based on cemetery records, to be between ten and fifteen thousand, with the possibility, if more graves or evidence is found, of being higher. The number killed may have equaled or exceeded sixteen thousand, the number sentenced to death during the Reign of Terror of the French Revolution.

For its part, The Commune executed about one hundred hostages, including the Archbishop of Paris, Georges Darboy, a large group of gendarmes, and a smaller group of priests.

Thirty-eight thousand captured Communard soldiers were imprisoned, including five thousand former soldiers who had not taken part in the fighting. They were marched to Versailles where they were kept until processed and sentenced or released. Twenty-three, including Commune leaders Théophile Ferré and Louis Rossel, were sentenced to death and executed. Two-hundred fifty one prisoners were sentenced to forced labor, and 1169 were deported to New Caledonia, including a number of women. Of those aged under sixteen years, fifty-eight were found guilty and sentenced to prison.

Several thousand Communards, including several leaders of the Commune, fled abroad after the Bloody Week, mostly to England, Belgium and Switzerland. All of the prisoners and exiles were pardoned in 1880, and some returned to France, resumed political careers, and won public office.

== Bibliography ==
=== In French ===
- Audin, Michele, La Semaine sanglante, Mai 1871, Legendes et Conmptes, Libertalia Publishers (2021) (in French)
- Rougerie, Jacques (2014). La Commune de 1871. Paris: Presses universitaires de France. ISBN 978-2-13-062078-5.
- Fierro, Alfred (1996). Histoire et Dictionnaire de Paris. Paris: Robert Laffont. ISBN 2-221-07862-4.
- Rougerie, Jacques (2004). Paris libre 1871. Paris: Editions du Seuil. ISBN 2-02-055465-8.
- Lissagaray, Prosper-Olivier (1876). Histoire de la Commune de 1871. Paris: La Decouverte/Poche. OCLC 1434605208.
- Milza, Pierre (2009). L'année terrible: La Commune (mars–juin 1871). Paris: Perrin. ISBN 978-2-262-03073-5.
- Tombs, Robert (2021). La guerre contre Paris -1871: l'ármée met fin à la Commune. Paris: Flammarion. ISBN 978-2-0802-4351-5.

=== In English ===
- Tombs, Robert. The Paris Commune 1871 (Routledge, 2014).
