= Abel Douay =

French Army officer (1809–1870)

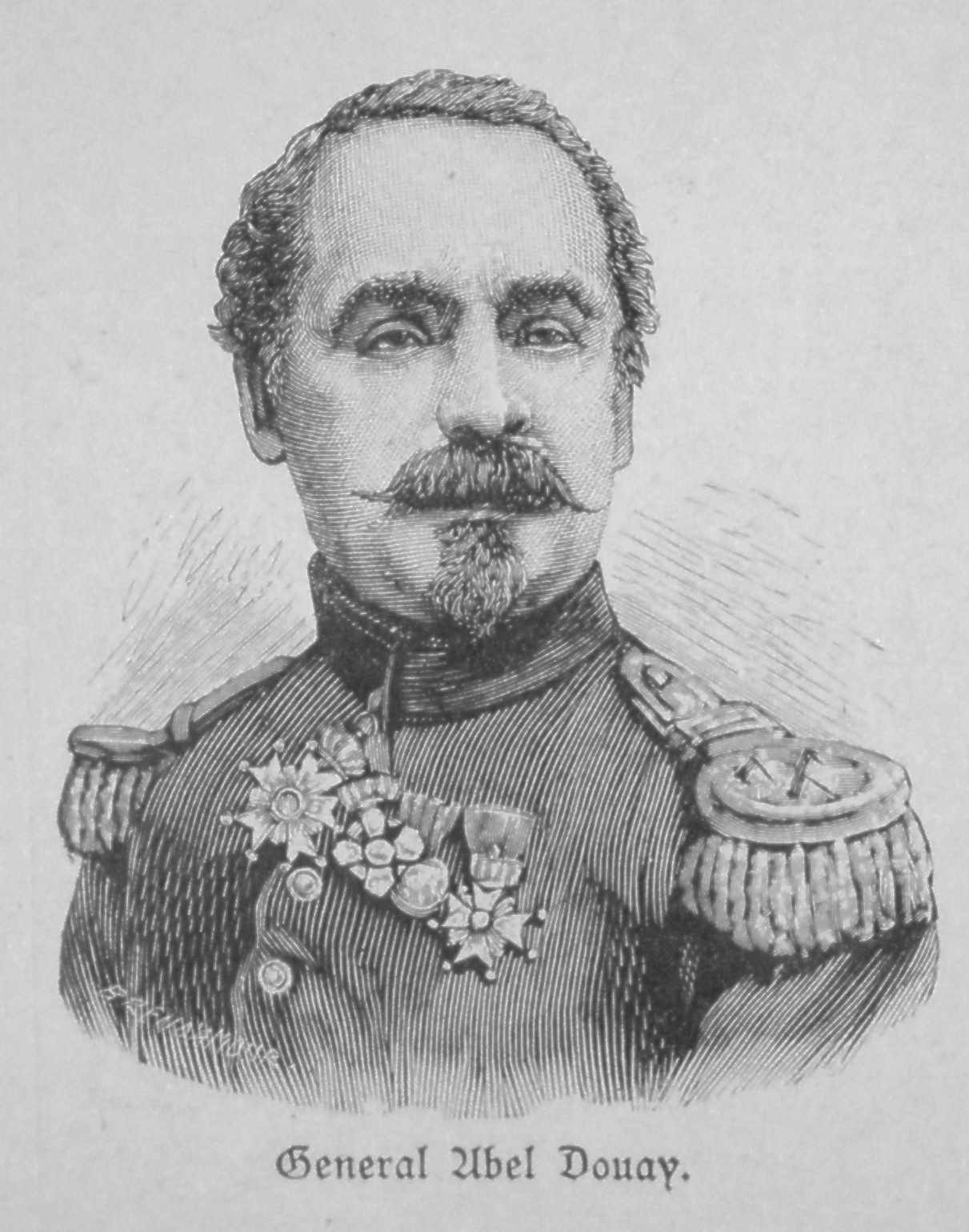
- Portrait of Douay
- Born: 2 March 1809; Draguignan, France
- Died: 4 August 1870 (aged 61); Wissembourg, France
- Burial place: Near Wissembourg
- Military career
- Allegiance: Kingdom of France; French Second Republic; Second French Empire
- Branch: French Royal Army; French Army
- Service years: 1827–1870
- Rank: Divisional general
- Conflicts: French conquest of Algeria; Crimean War; Second French intervention in Mexico; Second Italian War of Independence; Franco-Prussian War; Battle of Wissembourg (1870) †
- Awards: Legion of Honour

Divisional-General Charles Abel Douay (2 March 1809 – 4 August 1870) was a French Army officer who served in numerous military campaigns during the 19th century. During the Franco-Prussian War, he was recalled to active duty and killed in action at the age of sixty-one while fighting against Prussian forces near Wissembourg.

== Early life and military career ==
Charles Abel Douay was born in the city of Draguignan on 2 March 1809. He became a well-known and well-respected military officer, described roundly as an "able" and "intrepid" soldier. He served in the French conquest of Algeria, Crimean War, second French intervention in Mexico and Second Italian War of Independence.

He was the elder brother of General Félix Douay, who was also a distinguished career officer. (Because of their similar names and overlapping careers, the elder Douay is most frequently referred to as "Abel Douay".) At the beginning of the Franco-Prussian War, Abel Douay had already settled into his position as president of the military academy at Saint-Cyr.

== Franco-Prussian War and death ==
Recalled to active duty at the outbreak of war in 1870, the academy president was given command of a division under Marshal Patrice de Mac-Mahon at the frontline, and on the first day of the first battle of the war, Douay was killed in combat, hit by an artillery explosion. The subsequent Battle of Wissembourg (4 August 1870) proved a disaster for the French. Demoralized by the loss of their commander, Douay's outnumbered division fell back. By the end of the month, a crushing loss at the Battle of Sedan eliminated Mac-Mahon's entire army and, with it, the Second French Empire.

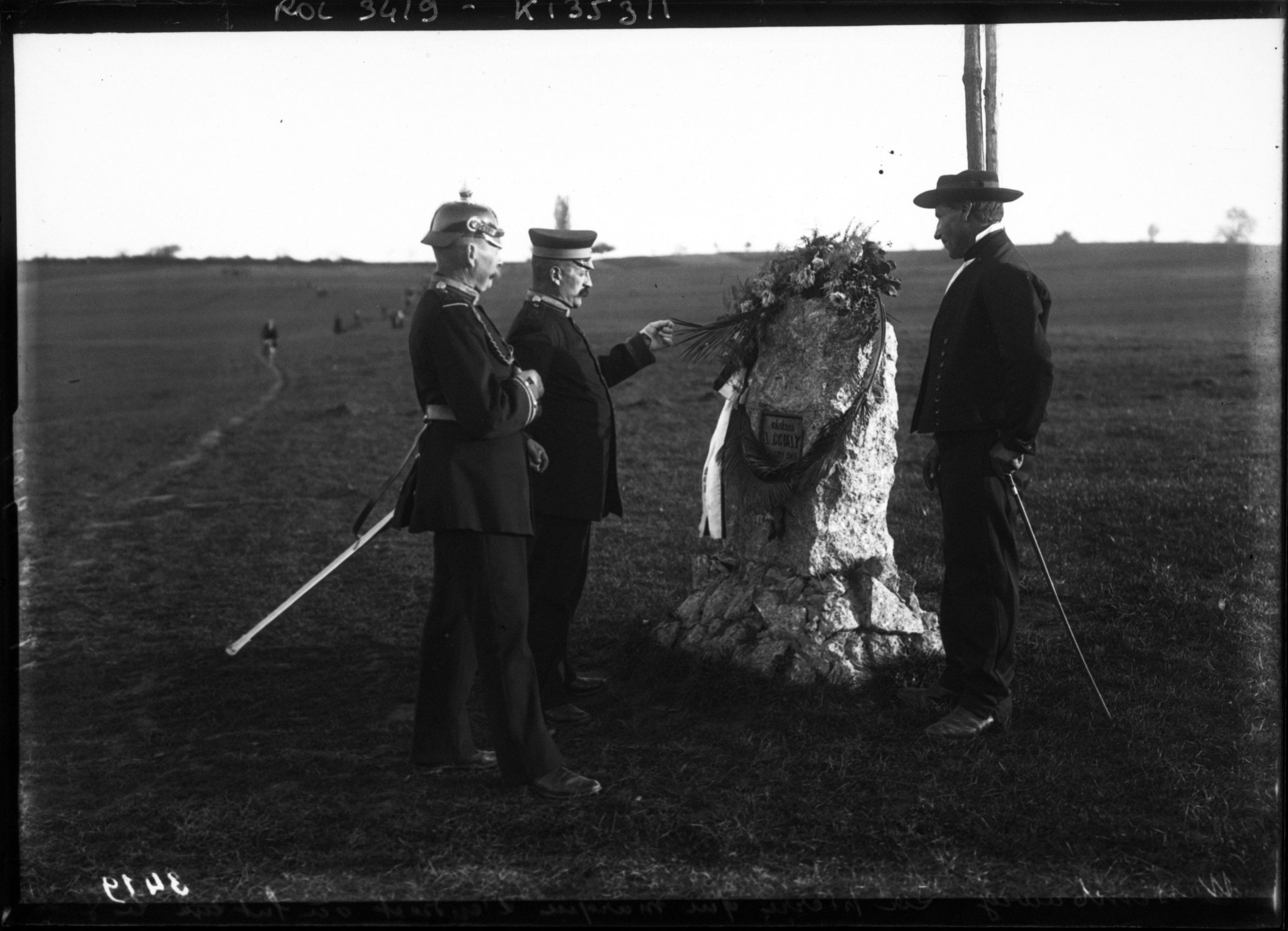
1909 photo showing a memorial stone marking the spot of Douay's death at Wissembourg

On 3 August 1870, the 61-year-old Douay led the forward division of Mac-Mahon's army group, a force of approximately 8,600, into the frontier town of Wissembourg in Alsace, the border region between the two combatant nations. Faulty intelligence had characterized the Prussians' border positions as weak and unready, and Douay's superiors felt confident that he could repulse any enemy probes while making use of the town's badly needed food and resources. Though the logistical benefit of the seizure of Wissembourg's stores was keenly appreciated at first, the tactical and strategic drawbacks quickly became known: the town, a flat lowland place with antiquated seventeenth-century fortifications, faced thickly wooded countryside which would help cover the advance of the attackers.

At 8:30am the next day, batteries of undetected Prussian artillery began pummelling the French position, and though Douay attempted a rapid defensive posture, the advantage of surprise had been devastatingly complete. The massive scale of the attack quickly became apparent – total Prussian forces are estimated between 50,000 and 80,000. By mid-morning Douay was already organizing for a withdrawal when he was killed by a burst of artillery. Some writers have mistakenly reported that he was hit by gunfire, but most historians concur that he died from a shell which exploded in the nearby ammunition magazine of one of the French grapeshot cannon. The withdrawal turned into a rout, with over 1,000 French soldiers killed and a thousand more taken prisoner.

== Legacy ==
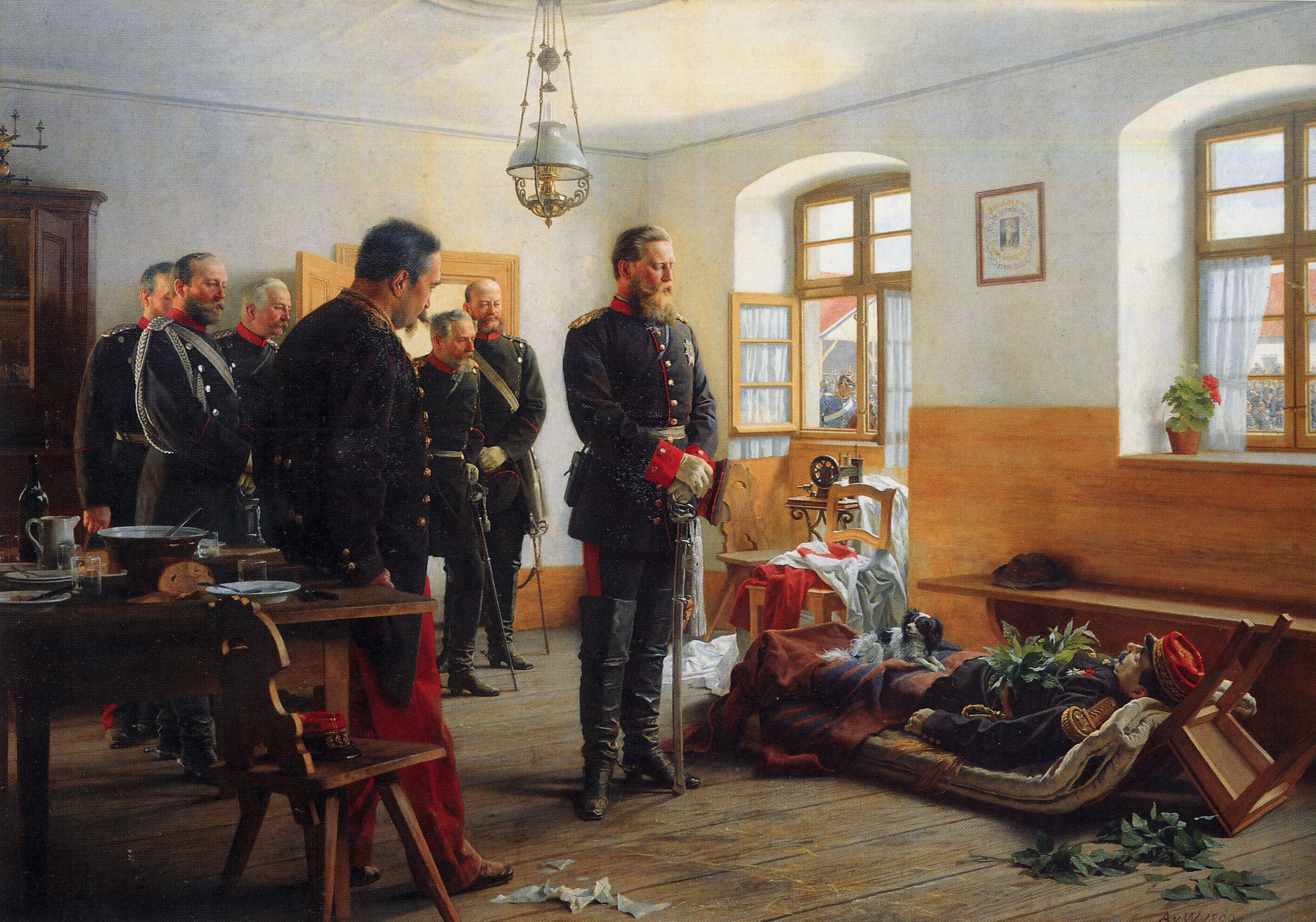
Crown Prince Frederick Wilhelm on the body of General Abel Douay, Weissenburg on 4 August 1870 (Anton von Werner, 1888)

Douay's death was a deeply demoralizing blow to the French army and gave a profound shock to the nation at large. Few, however, were as shocked as Napoleon III, who immediately issued a flurry of new orders reconstituting the army's command structure and strategic guidelines. Félix Douay was stationed along the same front as his older brother and fought at Sedan until the final surrender. He too served as a field commander, leader of the French 7th Corps. Douay was buried in a stately tomb just outside Wissembourg together with many of his fallen soldiers. A large monument to the battle was erected near his tomb at the end of the First World War.

20 years after the battle, an apocryphal story was published in Germany proffering a different story of Douay's death: a German "eyewitness" claimed that the general had been shot by one of his own men, allegedly for ordering a retreat. This story perhaps derived from the reported words of Frederick III who, advancing through the battlefield, had come upon Douay's corpse and made the bald observation that the general had died beyond the range of German rifle fire. A solemn portrayal of this scene was later created by the Prussian history painter Anton von Werner.
