= Félix Douay =

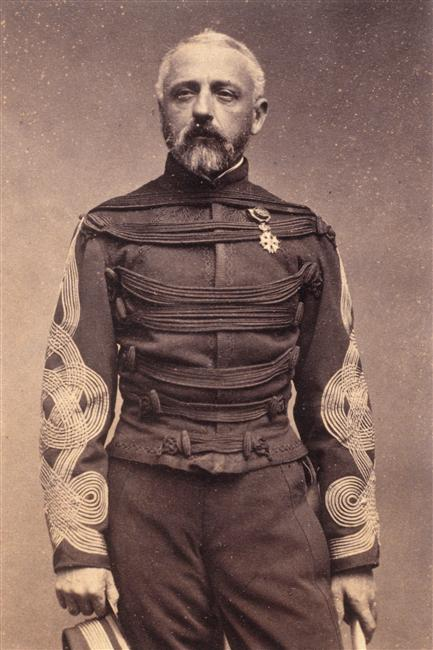
Félix Charles Douay

Félix Charles Douay (14 August 1816 – 5 May 1879) was a general in the French army whose career spanned the reign of King Louis-Philippe, the Second French Republic, the Second French Empire of Napoleon III, and the early years of the Third Republic. He was the brother of another career soldier, General Abel Douay.

He served in the Crimean War, in Italy, and in Mexico. For bravery at the battles of Magenta and Solferino, he was elevated to brigadier general.

During the Franco-Prussian War he was Commander-in-Chief of the French Seventh Army Corps. After the first defeats on the Alsace border, 7th Corps retreated and became part of Marshal Patrice de Mac-Mahon's frontline Army of Châlons. He was taken prisoner at the Battle of Sedan.

After his return to France, Douay led his Fourth Army Corps against the Paris Commune. He was first to enter Paris, 22 May 1871, and saved the Louvre from destruction.
