= Women in the Paris Commune =

The Paris Commune was an insurrectionary period in the history of Paris that lasted just over two months, from 18 March 1871 to the Semaine sanglante that ended on 28 May 1871. This insurrection refused to recognize the government of the National Assembly of 1871, which had just been elected by universal male suffrage. Many women took active roles in the events, and are known as "communardes". They are important in the history of women's rights in France, particularly with regards to women's emancipation. Equal pay and the first forms of structured organization of women in France appear during this period, in particular the Union des femmes pour la défense de Paris et les soins aux blessés or the Comité de vigilance de Montmartre.

== Context ==
=== A precarious daily life ===
Under the Second French Empire, salary inequalities were high: men earned twice as much as women, who were seen as competitors to men and employed at lower cost. In general, women worked from home in order to take care of their families, where alcohol problems were common. Industry and convents, which benefited from free labor, were strong competitors against freelancing women, lowering the value of their work. Sometimes working-class women became prostitutes to support their families.

=== Emergence of the women's movement ===
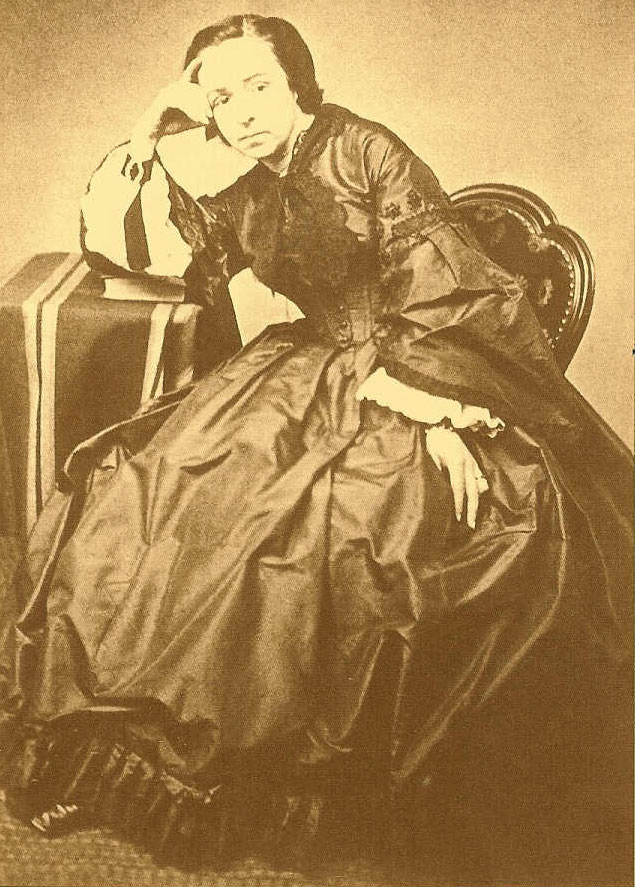
André Léo

The French Revolution of 1848 gave birth to some famous female figures such as Jeanne Deroin, and Pauline Roland who were however quickly forgotten, for the role they took for the Condition of women in France in 1848). The fight for women's rights continued in an intellectual way, leaving aside the working class.

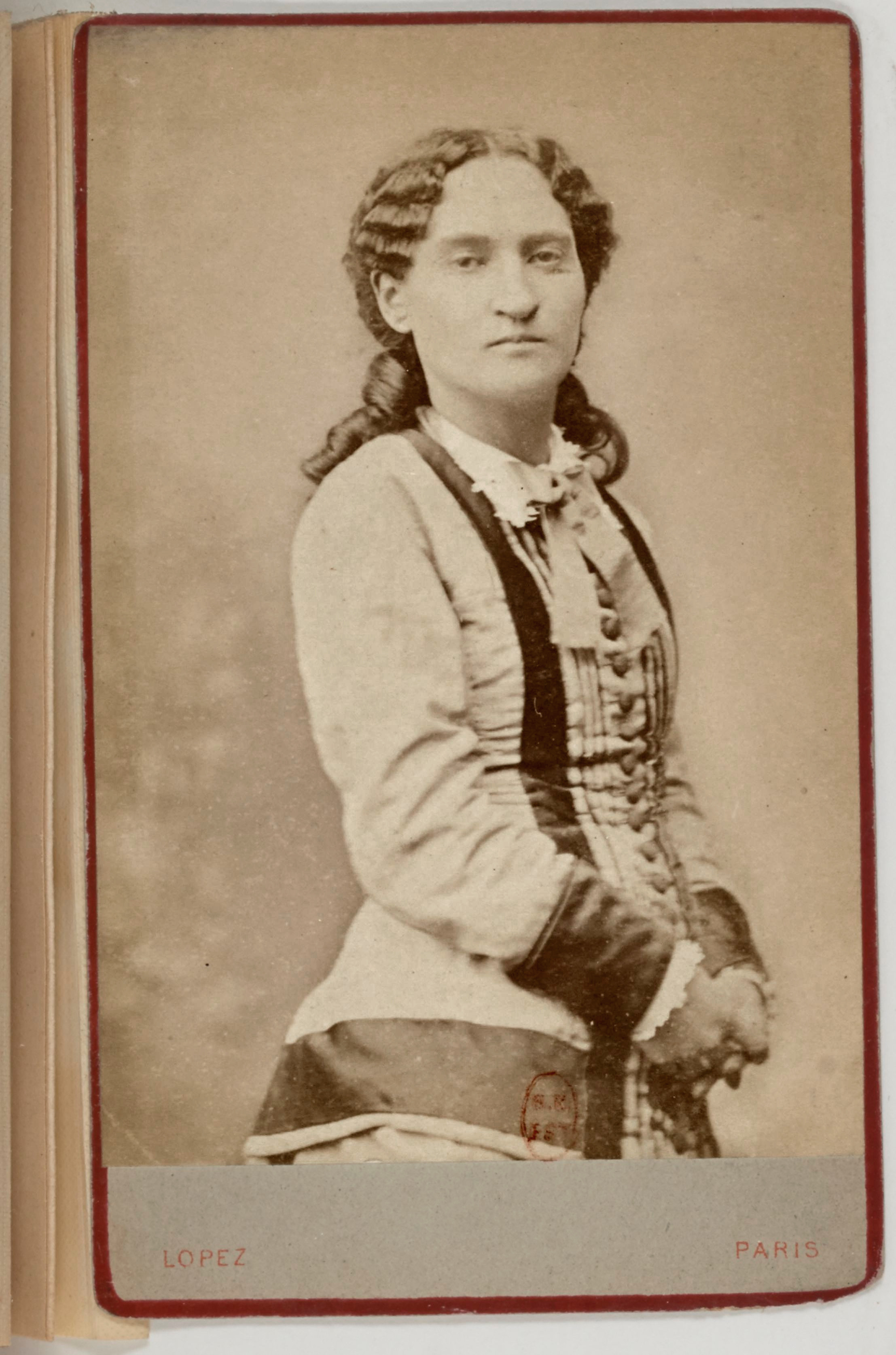
Paule Mink

The first French feminists appeared in France after the 1860s. André Léo took advantage of the relative freedom promoted by the Second French Empire at the beginning to publish works dedicated to the equality of the sexes. In 1866, she created the "Association for the Improvement of Women's Education" and in 1868, she published a text defending the equality of the sexes which was the origin of the first French feminist group. Other women also defended the idea of women's liberation such as Julie-Victoire Daubié, the first woman to obtain the baccalaureate in 1861, Paule Mink, Amélie Bosquet, Adèle Esquiros etc. All this reflection resulted in the creation of newspapers such as Le Droit des femmes by Léon Richer in 1869 and associations such as the "Société pour la revendication des droits civils de la femme" by André Léo, also in 1869. The different movements for the improvement of the female condition did not always agree on what was essential. Some put forward the education of girls while others demanded legal and civil equality.

=== 1870 war ===
On 8 September 1870 a demonstration, led by André Léo and Louise Michel, took place in front of the Paris City Hall and demanded arms to defend themselves against the Prussian Army. The following month, on 7 October 1870, about 150 women demanded the right to be able to care for the wounded of the 1870 war at the front and to replace the men in the ambulances. (Note: This right will be obtained during the Commune) After the siege of Paris (1870–1871) and a serious famine during the winter of 1870–1871, the French capitulation and the cease-fire on 26 January 1871, the situation seemed unbearable to the Parisians, who had resisted the enemy for nearly four months. Popular clubs and societies emerged during this siege and gave many women the opportunity to speak out on issues important to them.

The women who were active during this siege were also active during the Commune, such as Sophie Poirier and her uniform workshop or Louise Michel who set up an ambulance.

=== The outbreak of the Commune ===
When the government decided to disarm the Parisians, they felt directly threatened. Women began to participate in the various demonstrations of the Parisians, showing their anger and regrouping without a precise agenda. On 18 March the army came to fetch the cannons but the Parisian people opposed them. It was the women who were the first to wake up and prevent the soldiers from seizing the cannons. Louise Michel actively participates in this opposition on the Montmartre hilltop.

== Social measures ==
Few of the male leaders of the Commune, with the exception of Eugène Varlin, Léo Frankel and Benoît Malon, were concerned with issues directly related to the fate of women. Women did not have access to positions of power during this period.

Many of the Commune's measures, however, concerned the rights of families and workers, such as the recognition of free union (the movement paid a pension to the widows of federates, married or not, as well as to their legitimate or natural children), the prohibition of prostitution, the establishment of the beginnings of equal pay, access to education and the facilitation of divorce. Women are the indirect beneficiaries of these measures.

The historian Jacques Rougerie noted that

one does not see women claiming then, as some had done in 1848, a right of suffrage that their revolutionary companions would have refused them for sure.

On 10 May 1871 the Commission of Work and Exchange recognized the necessity of creating women's unions for the organization of women's work.

Two types of demands could be distinguished, according to the social origin of women without one excluding the other. For women from an educated background, political and civic equality (right to vote) were the objective in a context of class struggle. For those from a working-class background, the concerns were more concrete and focused, for example, on equal pay and access to education for girls.

== Political clubs ==
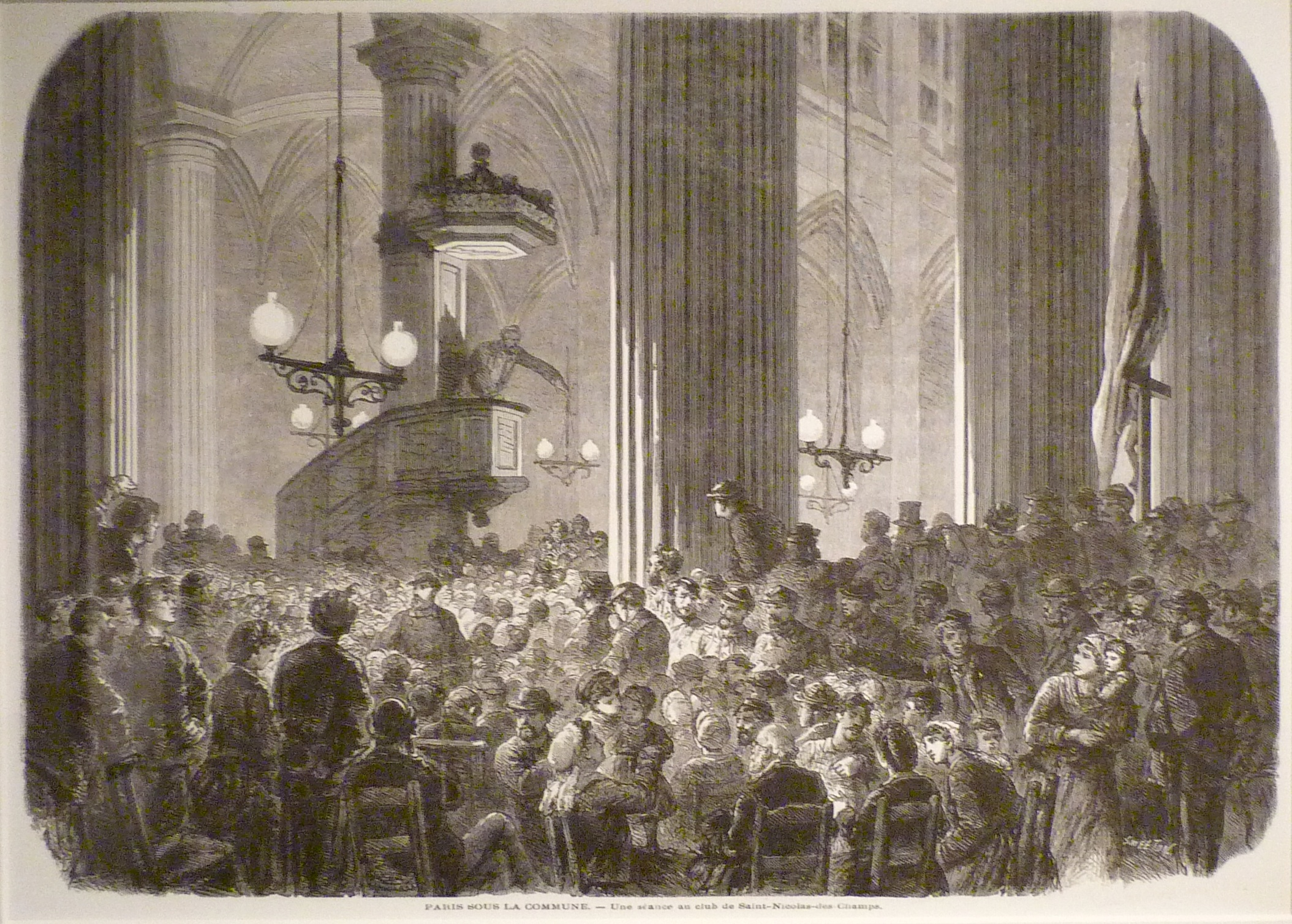
Club de Saint-Nicolas-des-Champs where women, after an initial refusal of their right to speak, contributed strongly. L'Illustration, 20 April 1871

The creation of the Clubs of the Paris Commune. by the Union des femmes ensured, in addition to the defense of Paris, the propagation of revolutionary ideas and the recruitment of women. Nathalie Lemel coordinated and sometimes intervened in its meetings held in the working class districts of Paris. The meetings were held in churches, and women were particularly active. The following have left traces in history:

- Comité de vigilance de Montmartre presided by Sophie Poirier.
- Club de la Délivrance at the Trinité church, presided over by Lodoïska Caweska.
- Club of Free-thinkers at the church Saint-Germain-l'Auxerrois,
- Club of Patriotic Women in Saint-Lambert de Vaugirard Church
- Club Saint Nicolas at the Club Saint Nicolas at the Saint-Nicolas-des-Champs Church.
- Club of Notre-Dame-de-la-Croix in Belleville
- Club Éloi, at the church Saint-Éloi in the 12th arrondissement.
- Club Ambroise in the 11th arrondissement with up to 3,000 women.
- Club des femmes de la Boule noire, on Rue des Acacias (Paris), chaired by Sophie Poirier with Béatrix Excoffon as vice-president.

=== The Union des femmes ===
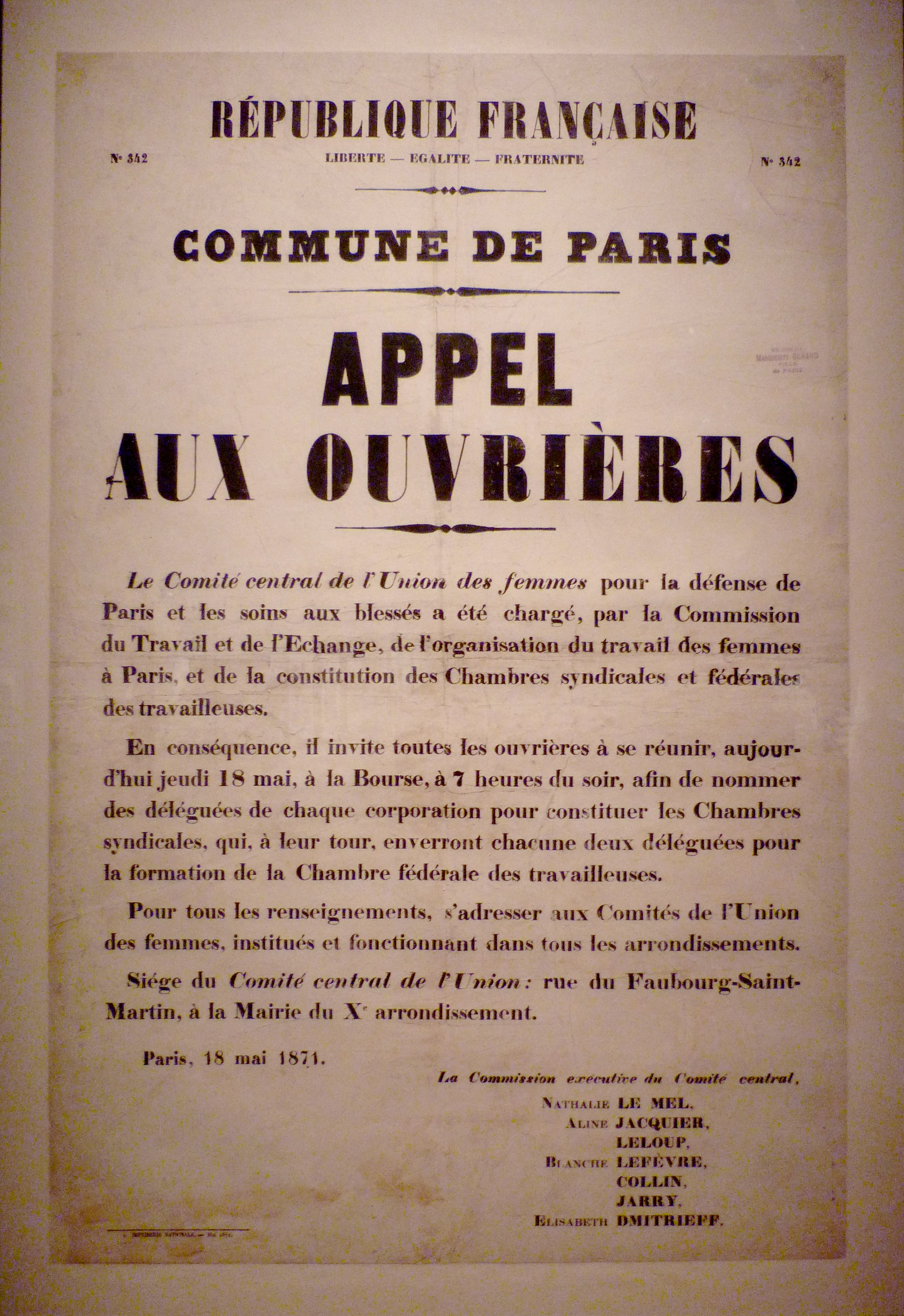
Appeal to women workers from the Union des femmes on 18 May 1871, signed among others by Élisabeth Dmitrieff, Nathalie Lemel and Aline Jacquier

One of the first movements openly claiming to be a mass feminist movement, the Union des femmes pour la défense de Paris et les soins aux blessés (Union of Women for the Defense of Paris and the Care of the Wounded) was created on 11 April 1871, in a café on rue du Temple by Nathalie Lemel and Élisabeth Dmitrieff. In its first appeal, this association positioned the Commune within the framework of the struggle for the emancipation of the working class, its two founders being members of the International Workers' Association (IWA), but the demands were broadened. In their minds, the work of the Union des femmes added to that of the International since the domination of men over women was one of the elements of the class struggle.

This union aimed to involve women more in the Commune through clubs and neighborhood meetings. The Union, well structured, was then able to organize support committees in each district allowing all ambulances to be provided by women. The Union took on a charitable role, taking over the place of the Church following the decree of separation of Church and State in schools and hospitals.

The Union demanded the right to work for women and obtained equal salaries (it started to be applied for teachers), it participated in the census of the workshops abandoned by their owners who took refuge in Versailles and organized self-managed workshops.

Certain district committees demanded the closing of brothels with varying degrees of success. The Club des libres penseurs voted for the complete emancipation of women.

The executive commission of the Commune supported the views of this committee without following up. According to Jacques Rougerie, historian of the Commune, it was only "a few groups of revolutionary women "26.

The influence of the Union des femmes grew throughout the Commune, from organizing meetings and training in nursing to arming women and forcing the enlistment of men for the defense of Paris.

=== Other associations ===
In addition to the Union des femmes, other women's organizations were also active during the Commune. The Comité des femmes de la rue d'Arras (Women's Committee of the Rue d'Arras) distinguished itself by organizing collective workshops "in order to prepare the organization of women's work by themselves", as well as the recruitment of women soldiers and the promotion of revolutionary ideas.

The society Éducation Nouvelle, made up of women teachers, asked the government of the Commune to establish a secular, compulsory, free school for all. Similarly, Louise Michel asked for the creation of secular orphanages and professional schools.

== Roles ==
=== Journalists ===
Generally speaking, there was little support for a women's newspaper, especially during the Commune, due to the revolutionary activities of women and the Commune itself. However, the newspapers La Commune, Le Rappel and La Sociale served as platforms for the ideas of André Léo, sometimes in the company of Benoît Malon. Paule Minck also wrote in La Commune.

=== Soldiers ===
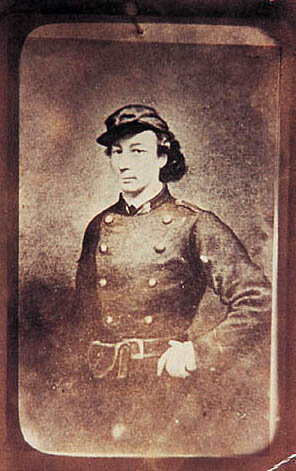
Louise Michel in military uniform

The appeal to the executive committee of the Commune showed that women want to be part of the defense of the Commune without distinction of sex:

That the Commune, representative of the great principle proclaiming the annihilation of all privilege, of all inequality, - by the same is committed, to take into account the just claims of the whole population, without distinction of sex, - distinction created and maintained by the need of the antagonism on which rest the privileges of the governmental classes

Despite the numerous appeals of women, the government of the Commune was slow to incorporate women into the defense of Paris. In fact, the Committee of Public Safety outlawed women on the battlefield on 1 May. André Léo attributed this to the "bourgeois and authoritarian mindset" of the army elite. Only the 12th legion managed to organize a company of "volunteer women citizens", called the Federated Legion of Women. However, they were intended only to pursue deserters and were not supposed to leave the city. This group was linked to Club Eloi and was led by Colonel Adélaïde Valentin and Captain Louise Neckbecker.

Most often, women were confined to non-fighting roles and their involvement in military actions was instead the result of neighborhood clubs and committees and the Women's Union. Nathalie Lemel urged women to take up arms at the Club de la Délivrance. Two other clubs, the Daughters of Père Duchêne and the Club of Women Patriots, also armed women for the defence of Paris.

During the semaine sanglante, several thousand women took to the barricades to defend the Commune. Louise Michel is known to have dressed in the uniform of the National Guard and Léontine Suétens was wounded twice. Marguerite Lachaise and Elizabeth Dmitrieff also took part, leading 140 women of the Union des femmes to the rue Blanche barricade.

=== Ambulance nurses and cantinières ===
During the fights between the National Guard and Versailles troops, the women help by participating in the care of the wounded or their supply. The fighting was done in families with the presence of children.

Of the 1,050 women judged by the councils of war, most were ambulance nurses, cantinières or food sellers.

=== "Pétroleuses" ===
Pétroleuse was a term used to describe a woman accused of having used petroleum to start fires during the crushing of the Paris Commune by the Versaillais. No evidence is available to support this role. The term was applied, especially after the burning of the Paris City Hall (24 May 1871), to women who had taken part in the armed struggle, making them the scapegoats for the vandalism that occurred during the semaine sanglante. This ideology persists to this day.

=== Other roles ===
The singer Agar gave a support concert at the Tuileries.

== Events ==
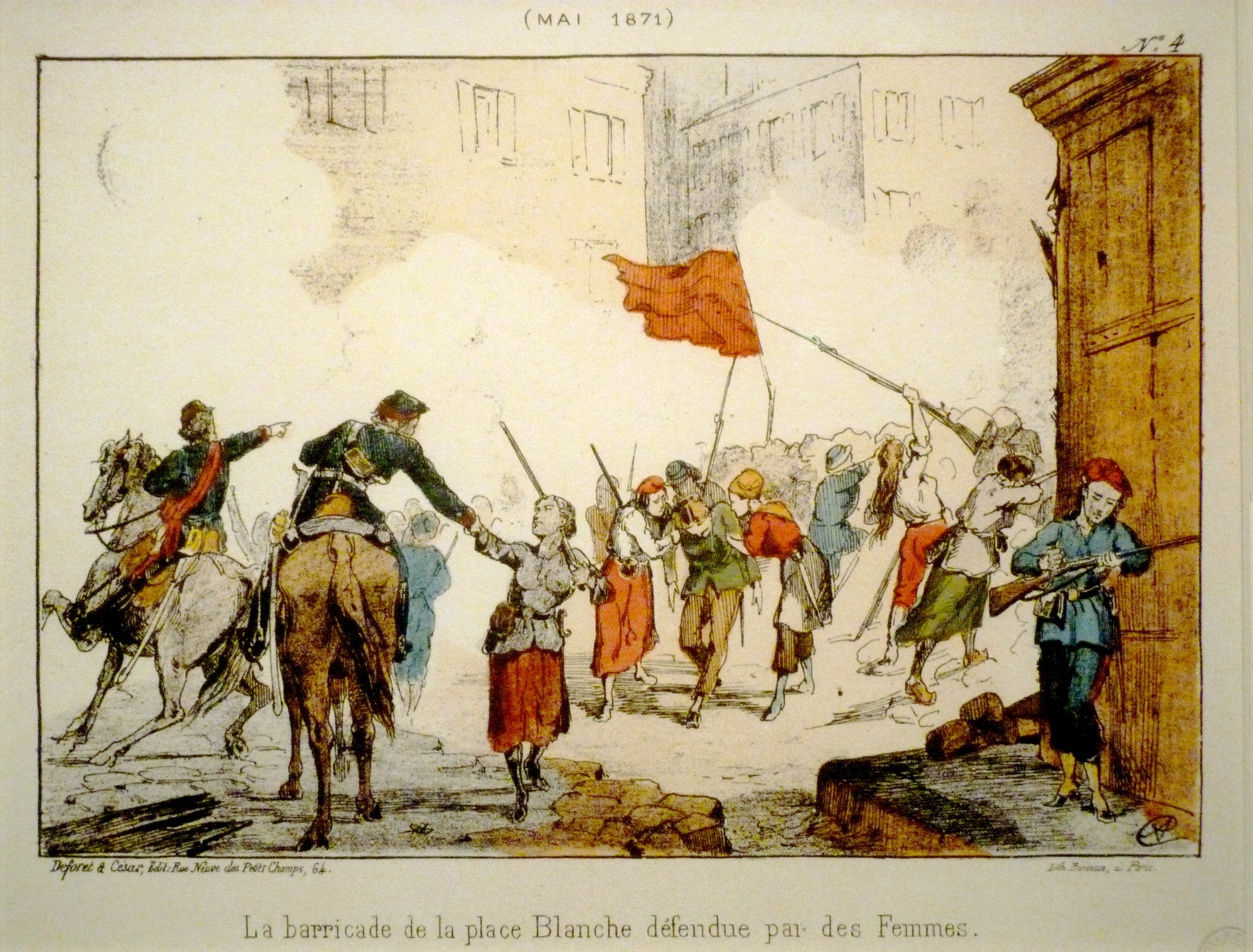
Barricade defended by women during the semaine sanglante. Lithograph by Moloch [fr]. Musée Carnavalet, Paris.

Some Parisian newspapers, such as Le Rappel, called on women to stay at home, but after an appeal on 3 April to women in Communard newspapers, several women's marches took place, including one on 5 April 1871 towards Versailles, where the National Assembly had taken refuge, following the example of the one that had marched in October 1789. The marchers were turned back before they reached Versailles, but the marches presaged the creation of the Union des femmes on 11 April 1871.

On 10 April 1871 a group of women seized a guillotine and symbolically burned it on the Place Voltaire, in order to signify the difference between the concept of revolution (a symbol of liberation) and scaffold (a symbol of oppression).

During the semaine sanglante when the Versailles troops entered Paris, women, among them Elisabeth Dmitrieff, Nathalie Lemel, Blanche Lefebvre, Béatrix Excoffon and Malvina Poulain, defended the Place Blanche on a barricade on 23 May 1871. 120 women delayed General Clinchant's troops before retreating, exhausted and short of ammunition, to the Place Pigalle. Many communardes were present for the defense of the Montparnasse station or on the barricades of the Pigalle place, in Batignolle.

When the Versaillais took over Paris, the fate of the women was no different from that of the men: execution on the spot or summary judgment. 4,000 women were killed, for a total of 20,000 victims. 1,051 women were imprisoned and judged by the 4th Council of War. No woman was sentenced to death, but many were imprisoned, deported or sentenced to forced labor. Very often, the military authorities always tried to prove either their sexual immorality (concubine, prostitute, lesbian according to the terms and the gradation in place) or the fact that they were thieves, hysterical or criminals. Generally speaking, it was their revolutionary and ideological activity more than their military activity that worried the Council of War. Maria Deraismes was one of the only ones to defend them.

Some managed to escape, with their families if necessary. A general amnesty was declared in 1880.

== Importance ==
There are differing views on the importance of the role of women during the Commune, particularly because of the lack of testimony. It is certain that their participation gave moral authority to this insurrection.

Jacques Rougerie expressed the view that they "bravely held their place without having to exaggerate it in these brief days of 1871". Eugène Schulkind considers that "it is remarkable that this group of women realized better from the beginning, the importance of a revolutionary theory as a weapon and of a strong organization as a means of realization, than most of the members, even of the Commune".

Paul Lidsky, a specialist in anti-Communard writings by artists and intellectuals from the French elite, indicated that the women of the Commune were the target of particular violence. The contempt for the working classes is associated with a profound misogyny. The bravery of the women fighters is recognized but assimilated to psychiatric and nervous problems proper to the "weak sex". Their sexual morality is questioned and they are accused of being prostitutes, of being women prone to moral and sexual perversion who want to enjoy free union or even sexual communism. Any social and political dimension is denied to their action. Alexandre Dumas fils wrote in particular "We will say nothing about their females, by respect for the women to whom they resemble - when they are dead".

== Posterity ==
=== Comics ===
- Wilfrid Lupano, Communardes !, Glénat, Vents d'Ouest, 2015–2016

== Photo gallery of women communards ==
Elisabeth Javelin

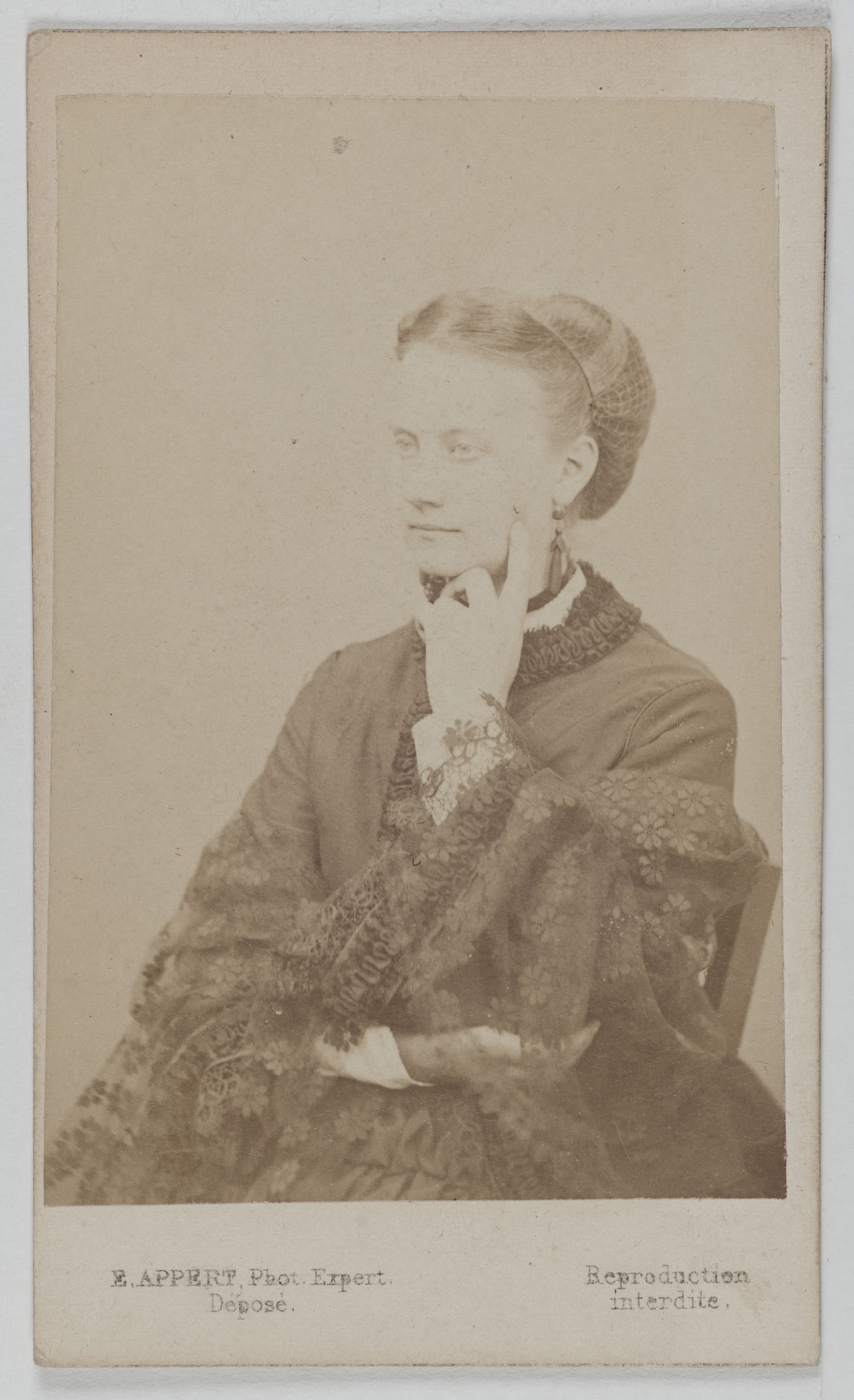
Portrait of Marie Leroy (took part in the Commune)

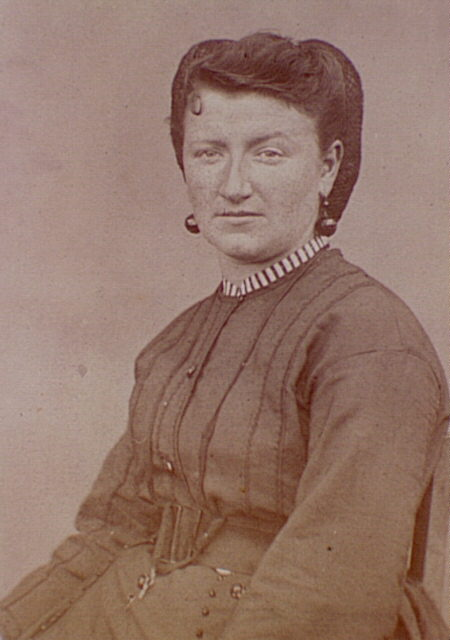
Portrait of Boulanger Eugénie, taken in the prison of Versailles.

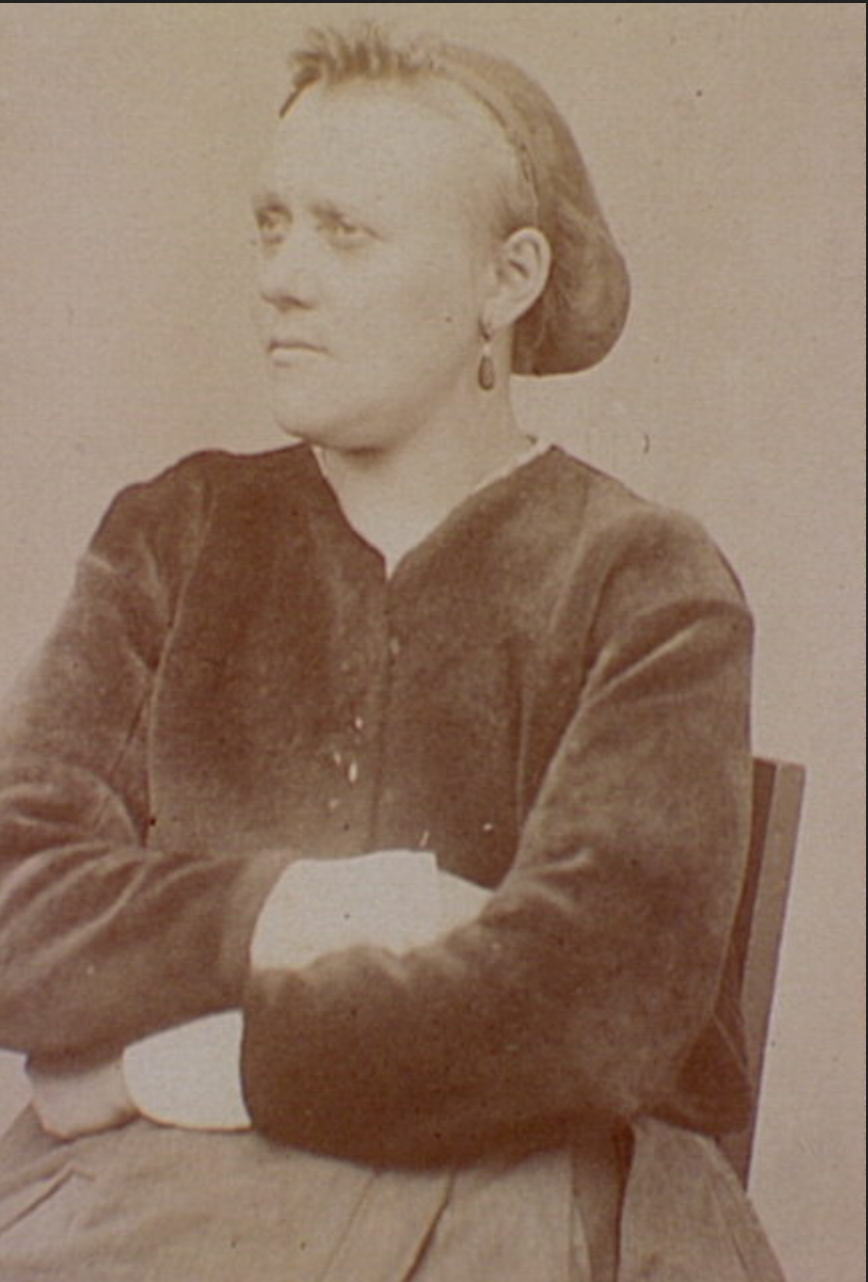
Portrait of Eulalie Papavoine (1846–1875)

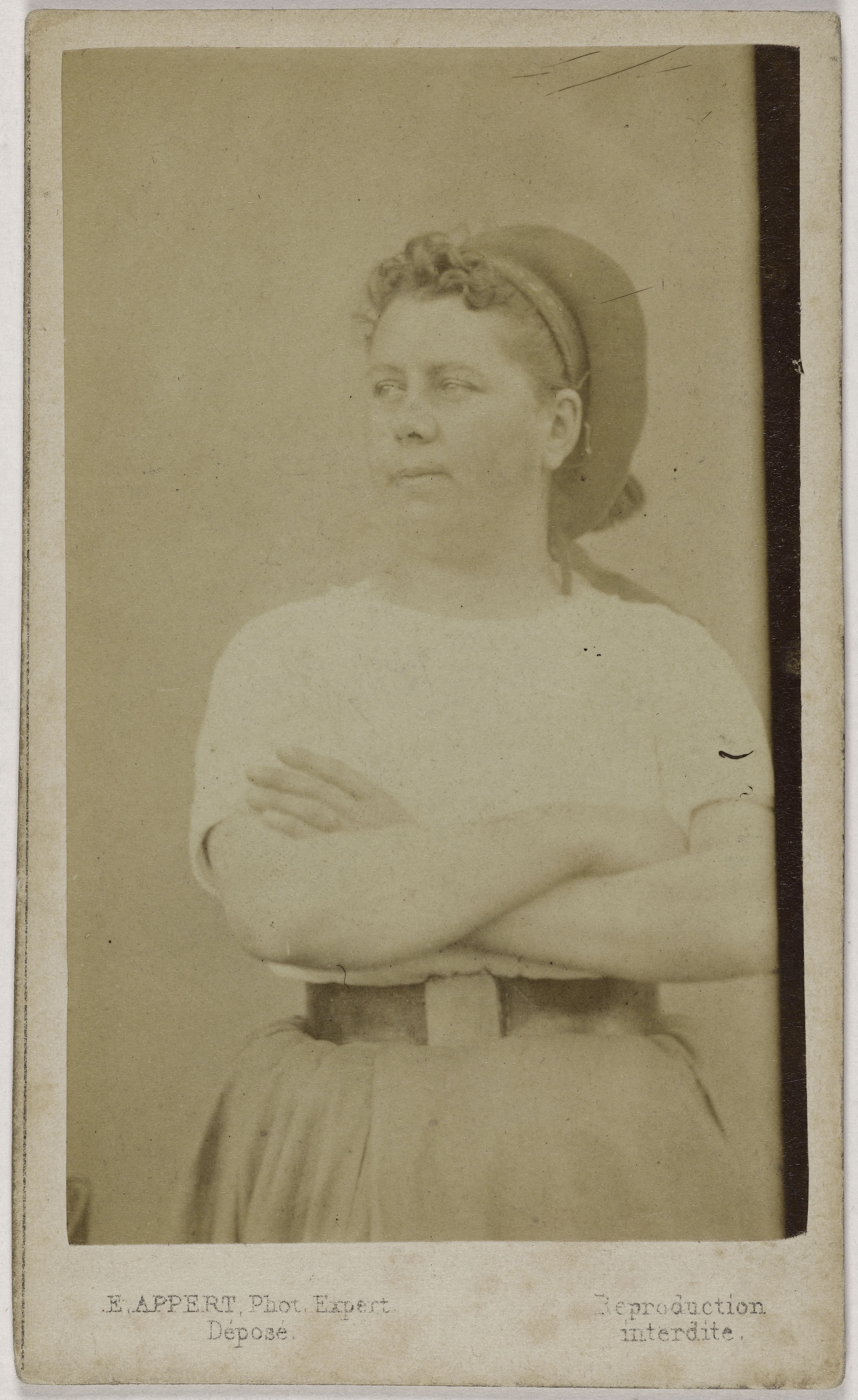
Hortense David, Machu's wife, at the prison des Chantiers in Versailles

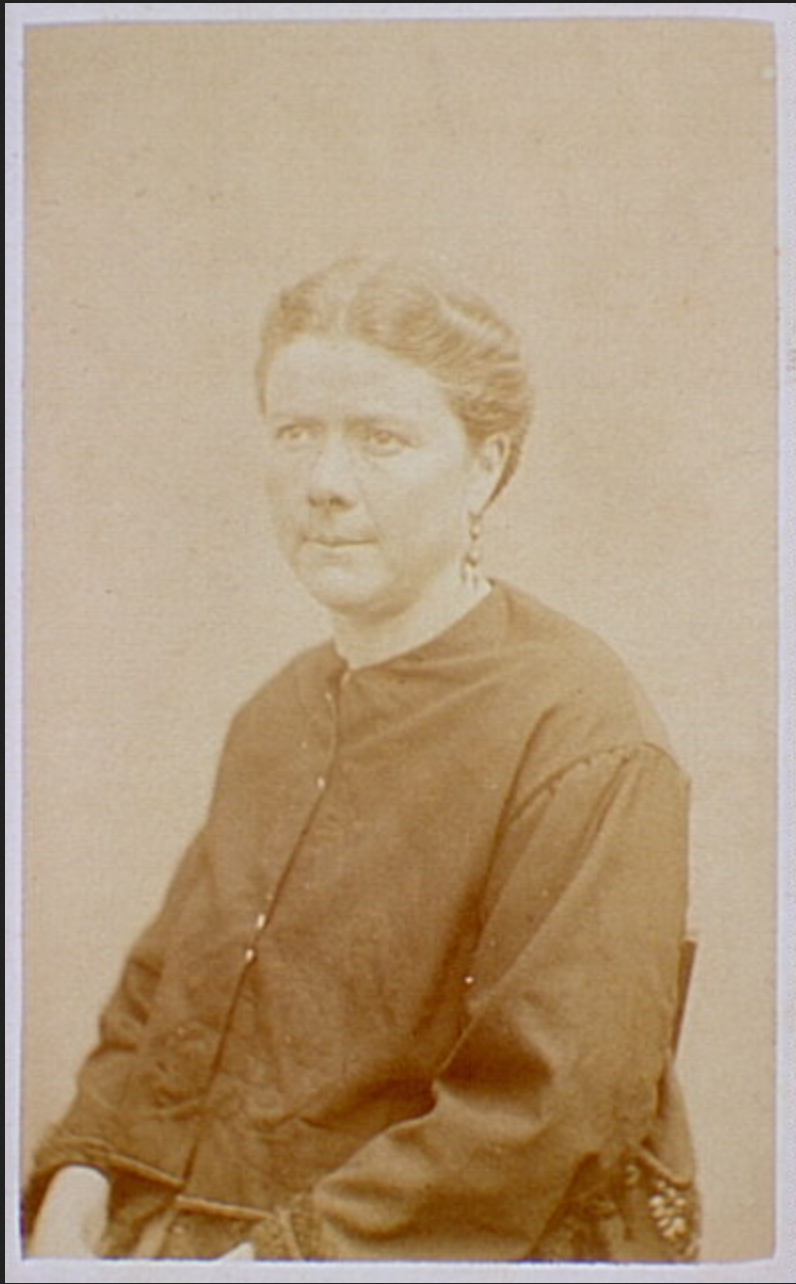
Élisabeth Rétiffe (1834–1882)

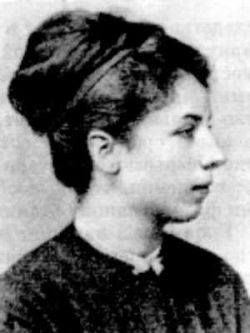
Elisabeth Dmitrieff

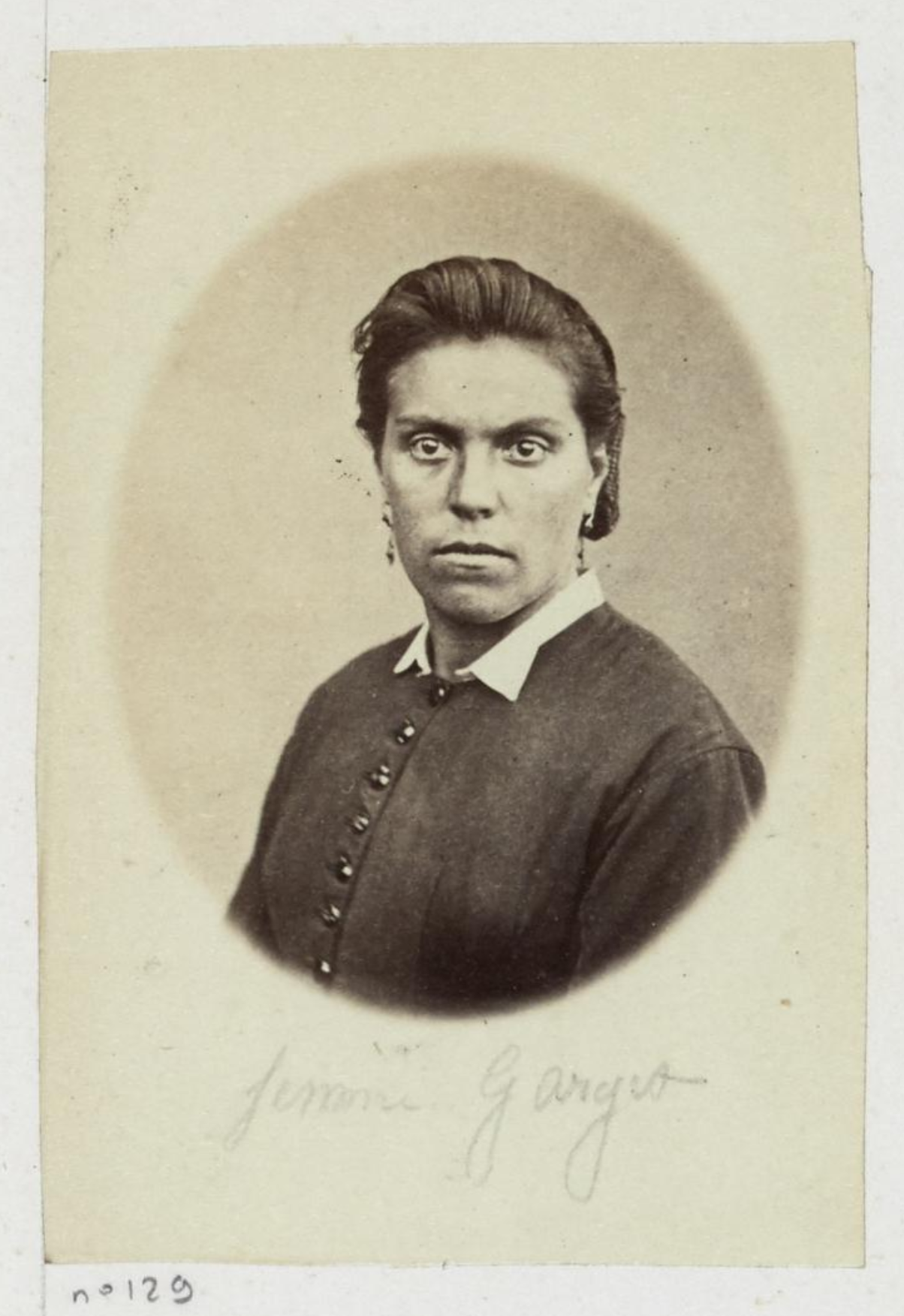
Victorine Gorget

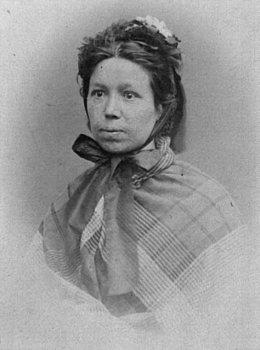
Anne-Marie Ménand

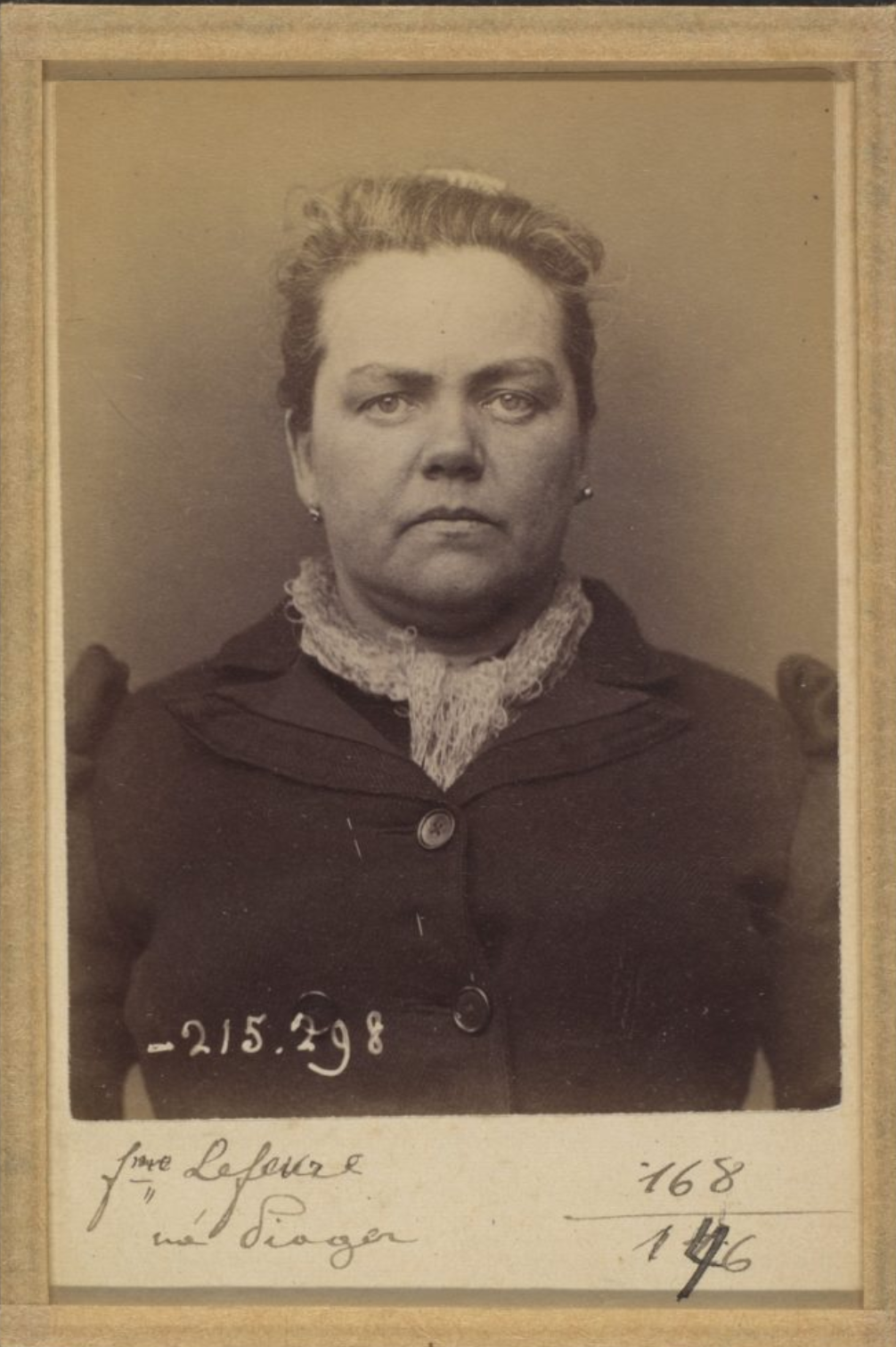
Louise Pioger, songmaker

== Bibliography ==
- Eichner, Carolyn Jeanne (2022). The Paris Commune : a brief history. New Brunswick, NJ: Rutgers University Press. ISBN 9781978827684.
- Eichner, Carolyn J. (2004). Surmounting the Barricades: Women in the Paris Commune. Bloomington, IN: Indiana University Press. ISBN 0-253-34442-5.
- Johnson, Martin Phillip (1996). The Paradise of Association: Political Culture and Popular Organizations in the Paris Commune of 1871. University of Michigan Press. ISBN 978-0-472-10724-7.
- Johnson, Martin P. (1997). "Memory and the Cult of Revolution in the 1871 Paris Commune". Journal of Women's History. 9 (1): 39–57. doi:10.1353/jowh.2010.0188. S2CID 144137693.
- Johnson, Martin Philip (1994). "Citizenship and gender: the légion des Fédérées in the Paris Commune of 1871". French History. 8 (3): 276–295. doi:10.1093/fh/8.3.276.
- Linton, Marisa (1997). "Les femmes et la Commune de Paris de 1871". Revue historique (in French) (2). Presses Universitaires de France (PUF): 23–48. doi:10.3917/rhis.g1997.603n2.0023. ISSN 0035-3264.
- Schulkind, Eugene (1985). "Socialist Women during the 1871 Paris Commune". Past & Present (106): 124–163. doi:10.1093/past/106.1.124. JSTOR 650641.
- Schulkind, Eugene W. (1950). "Le rôle des femmes dans la Commune de 1871". Revue d'Histoire du XIXe siècle - 1848. 42 (185): 15–29. doi:10.3406/r1848.1950.1467.
- Riot-Sarcey, Michèle (2008). Histoire du féminisme (Nouv. éd ed.). Paris: La Découverte. ISBN 978-2-7071-5472-9. OCLC 300280620.
- Thomas, Édith (1963). Les Pétroleuses. La suite des temps (in French). Éditions Gallimard.
- — (1966). The Women Incendiaries. Translated by Atkinson, James; Atkinson, Starr. New York: George Braziller, Inc.
