= Anne-Marie Ménand =

Communarde (b. 1837)

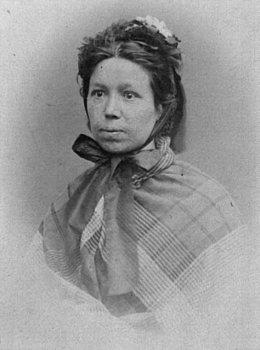
- Anne-Marie Ménand around 1871
- Born: 9 June 1837; Saint-Séglin
- Known for: Participation in the Paris Commune

Anne-Marie Ménand, née Marie Louise Ménan (born 9 June 1837) was a cook who was accused of being an arsonist during the Paris Commune. She was arrested, brought before the military tribunal, and sentenced to death. Her sentence was commuted and she was instead deported to French Guiana.

== Biography ==
Ménand was a Breton, born on 9 June 1837 in Saint-Séglin, Ille-et-Vilaine, to a labourer, Barthélémy Ménan, and his wife Périne Bertier. Her name is variously given as Anne-Marie, Marie Josèphe, or Jeanne-Marie, and her last name as Ménan, Ménand, or Menans.

The date of her arrival in Paris is unknown, but she was a cook there until 1867. She then became a newspaper-seller at Rue Royale and Place de la Madeleine. In the neighbourhood, she was known as "the woman with the yellow dog." She lived in Vincennes in October 1870, selling eau de vie to soldiers and engaging in prostitution; she was often seen drunk. During the Siege of Paris, in December 1870, she was sentenced to six days of prison for being involved in a theft.

She said that she returned to Paris during the Commune and worked with her sister-in-law, who ran a canteen.

During Bloody Week, at the end of the Paris Commune, she treated the wounded on Rue Royale on 22 and 23 May. She also sought out linen and food for the defenders, as well as "bourgeois" clothing that could be used to disguise National Guard troops so they could escape. Most importantly, once the National Guard began lighting fires to hold back the invading Versailles soldiers, she worked to evacuate people from the houses that were about to be burned. She was arrested on the 24th, accused of having taken part in the fires on Rue Royale, then released and again arrested.

She appeared before the 4th Council of War, in the second trial of the pétroleuses, along with Florence Van de Walle and Aurore Machu. The three women had been with the National Guard troops who fought at the barricades of Rue Royale and the Faubourg Saint-Honoré on 22–23 May, and who set fires at Rue Royale, the Place de la Concorde, and the Tuileries in the aftermath of the battle. Ménand, Van de Walle, and Machu were accused of having taken part in the arsons. No witness had seen Ménand set anything on fire, and she denied it, but she was nevertheless condemned to death on 16 April 1872. Her sentence was commuted on 24 July 1872 to forced labour for life, and she was deported to French Guiana. According to Édith Thomas, of the many women who were accused of being pétroleuses in the aftermath of the Commune, Anne-Marie Ménand and Florence Van de Walle were the only two who may actually have participated in any arson. The date of her death is unknown.

== In literature ==
Since she was sometimes known as Jeanne-Marie, Édith Thomas has suggested that she may have been the "Jeanne-Marie" of Arthur Rimbaud's poem, "Les Mains de Jeanne-Marie".

Maxime Du Camp wrote an extremely unflattering description of her: "I have never seen ugliness like hers. Swarthy, wide-eyed, with dull and dirty hair, a face covered in freckles, thin lips, and a stupid laugh, she had something wild about her that reminded me of the bewilderment of nocturnal birds suddenly placed in the sun."

== Bibliography ==
- Maurice Dommanget, Hommes et choses de la Commune, 2013, p. 71.
- Michel Cordillot (dir.), La Commune de Paris, 1871. L’événement, les acteurs, les lieux, Ivry-sur-Seine, Les Éditions de l’Atelier, January 2021.
- Thomas, Édith (1963). Les Pétroleuses. La suite des temps (in French). Éditions Gallimard.
- Thomas, Édith (1966). The Women Incendiaries. Translated by Atkinson, James; Atkinson, Starr. New York: George Braziller, Inc.

== See also ==
- Women in the Paris Commune
