= Léontine Suétens =

French communard (1846–1891)

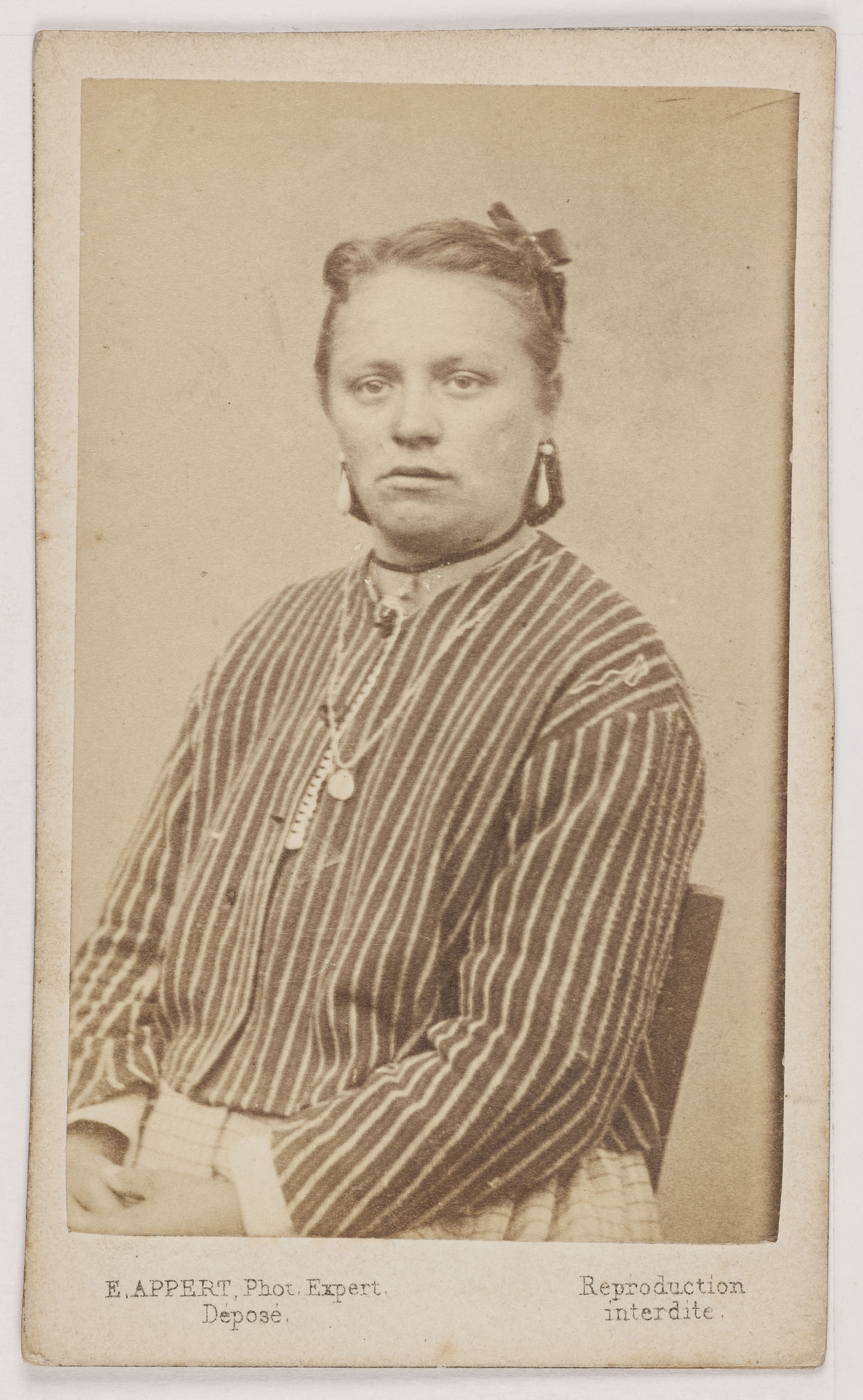
- Portrait of Léontine Suétens by Ernest-Charles Appert at the Chantiers prison at Versailles
- Born: 4 May 1846; Beauvais
- Died: 2 November 1891 (aged 45); Saint-Laurent-du-Maroni
- Occupations: Laundress, communard
- Organization: Paris Commune
- Known for: Defendant in the trial of the pétroleuses

Léontine Suétens (1846-1891) was a laundress and a communard. She was convicted in the trial of the "pétroleuses", which began 3 September 1871.

== Life ==
=== Before the Paris Commune ===
Léontine Suétens was born in 1846 in Beauvais. Her father, Jean Baptiste Suétens, a tailor with progressive ideas, left for Paris in 1848. Her mother, Sophie Olympe Doudeuil, was also from a working-class family.

She lived in concubinage with a carver, Aubert, from 1864.

She was convicted to a year of imprisonment for theft in 1867.

In 1870, she followed her companion, a sergeant-major of the 135th bataillion, and became a cantinière. She participated in the battles of Neuilly, Issy, Vanves, and Levallois-Perret, where she was wounded twice. She wore a red scarf, carried a Chassepot rifle, and helped the wounded.

=== Trial ===
Suétens was one of the defendants of the trial of the "pétroleuses" that began on 3 September 1871. Her lawyer was delinquent, so she was defended by a military officer, the maréchal des logis Bordelais: he "relied on the wisdom of the council". The Court Martial condemned her to death on 4 September 1871, along with two of her co-accused, Élisabeth Rétiffe and Joséphine Marchais.

Victor Hugo took up the defence, partly of Théophile Ferré and Louis Rossel, but also of three women: Léontine Suétens, Eulalie Papavoine, and Joséphine Marchais. He considered the insurgents to be revolutionary fighters, not criminals under common law. Regarding the three women, he also raised the social question:

I demand life for these three unfortunate women, Marchais, Suétens, and Papavoine, while recognizing that, in my feeble intelligence, it is proven that they wore red scarves, that Papavoine is a dreadful name, and that they were seen at the barricades - to fight, according to their accusers, and to transport the wounded, according to themselves. One thing more is proven to me: that one of them is a mother, and that, at her death sentence, she said, "That's fine; but who will feed my child?"

I demand life for this child.

Let me pause for a moment.

"Who will feed my child?" The whole social wound is in that quote. I know that it was laughable for me to ask last week, in the face of the misfortunes of France, for unity among the French people, and I know that it will be laughable this week for me to demand life for the condemned. I am resigned to this. So here is a mother who is going to die, and here is a little child who will die too, as a consequence. Our justice has its successes. Is the mother guilty? Answer yes or no. Is the child? Try to answer yes.

— Victor Hugo, Depuis l'exil

Either the pardon commission hesitated in the face of the lack of evidence, or Hugo's intervention was decisive; the death sentences of the three women were commuted to hard labour in Guiana.

=== Detention in Guyana ===
In Saint-Laurent-du-Maroni in 1875, Léontine Suétens married Aïssa (ben Tafaroui) ben Tebra, who was born in Oran and lived in Saint-Maurice.

In 1877, the governor of Guiana complained about Suétens and her fellow inmates, indignant that they created "perpetual embarassments" and caused complaints from prison staff. He requested from the ministère de la Marine "the authorization to place them in provisional freedom, as is done for black women". However, a partial amnesty was voted in in 1879, and a total amnesty for all condemned communards in 1880.

Léontine Suétens died at the Saint-Laurent-du-Maroni hospital in 1891, at the age of 45. Her husband died the following year in Cayenne.

== Legacy ==
Édith Thomas, the first historian to be interested in the case of the "pétroleuses", is unambiguous about the innocence of Léontine Suétens: two of the women who were put on trial "may have taken part in the fires. But certainly not Élizabeth Rétiffe, Léontine Suétens, Joséphine Marchais, Eulalie Papavoine, or Aurore Machu - all of whom were condemned as "pétroleuses", because someone had to be guilty and no one could be found."

Ludivine Bantigny paid homage to her in a correspondence "beyond time" in a chapter of Les Réprouvées.
