= Marchais =

Marchais may refer to:

- Auguste Marchais (1872–1951), French athlete and Olympian
- Georges Marchais (1920–1997), French politician
- Joséphine Marchais (1837–1874), accused of being a pétroleuse in the Paris Commune
- places in France:
  - Marchais, Aisne, a commune in the department of Aisne
  - Marchais-en-Brie, a commune in the department of Aisne
  - Marchais-Beton, a commune in the department of Yonne
  - Saulx-Marchais, a commune in the department of Yvelines
