= Eulalie Papavoine =

Communard (1846–1875)

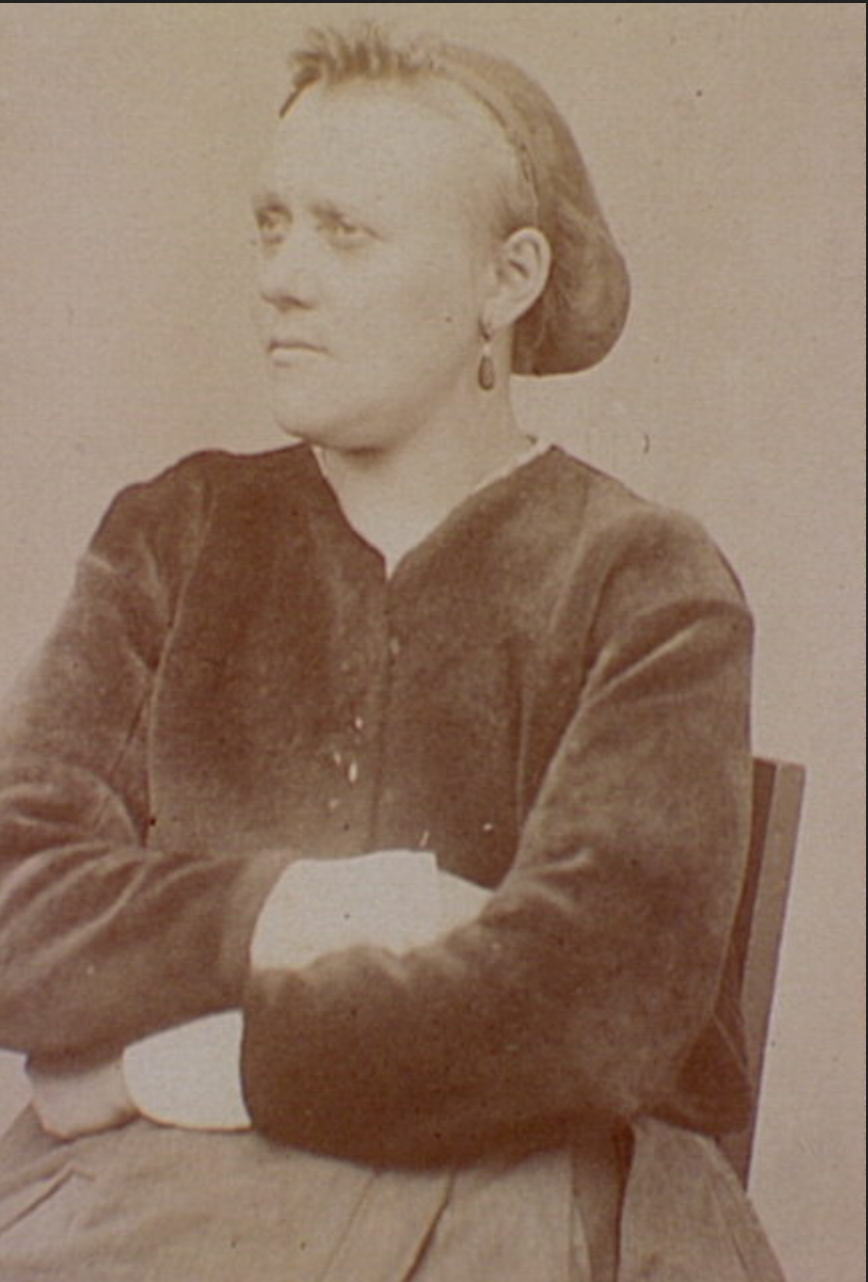
- Eulalie Papavoine photographed by Eugène Appert at the Chantiers prison at Versailles.
- Born: 11 November 1846; Auxerre
- Died: 24 May 1875 (aged 28); Châlons-en-Champagne
- Occupations: Seamstress, communard
- Organization: Paris Commune
- Known for: Defendant in the trial of the pétroleuses

Eulalie Papavoine (11 November 1846 – 24 May 1875) was a Parisian seamstress. She participated in the Paris Commune as an ambulance nurse.

== Biography ==
=== Paris Commune ===
Eulalie Papavoine was unmarried and lived with Rémy Ernest Balthazar, a journeyman engraver, who was a corporal in the 135th battalion of the National Guard. She had a child with him. During the Paris Commune, she followed him as an ambulance nurse to battles at Neuilly, Issy, Vanves, and Levallois.

=== Arrest and trial ===
Arrested after Bloody Week, Papavoine was imprisoned at Satory, identified as a probable ringleader alongside Louise Michel and Victorine Gorget, then taken with about forty other women to the Chantiers prison at Versailles. Eventually she was taken to a detention centre with very difficult conditions.

The trial of the "pétroleuses" began on 3 September 1871. Papavoine was accused, alongside Léontine Suétens, of having stolen three handkerchiefs from a house on the Rue de Solférino. A first aid centre had been set up in the house, to treat those injured in an explosion on Avenue Rapp. Papavoine rescued the wounded, gave them first aid at Solférino, and then took them to the Hôpital de la Charité.

She had no previous convictions, and denied participating in the fires in the neighbourhood, but admitted to having organized the first aid centre in the house on the Rue de Solférino. Interrogated by the presiding judge, she responded:

"You certainly must have suspected that they were going to burn some buildings [...], why did you not leave those wretched people?"
"I wanted to share my lover's fate."
"Why [...] did you stay behind when the battalion fled?"
"We had dead and wounded men."

=== Sentence ===
On 4 September 1871 she was sentenced to deportation to a walled fortress and to the loss of her civil rights ("dégradation civique"). While imprisoned, she was authorized to marry Rémy Balthazar, who was detained in the docks at Satory, to legitimize her son, who was four years old.

Victor Hugo took up the defence, partly of Théophile Ferré and Louis Rossel, but also of three women: Léontine Suétens, Eulalie Papavoine, and Joséphine Marchais. He considered the insurgents to be revolutionary fighters, not criminals under common law. Regarding the three women, he wrote:

I demand life for these three unfortunate women, Marchais, Suétens, and Papavoine, while recognizing that, in my feeble intelligence, it is proven that they wore red scarves, that Papavoine is a dreadful name, and that they were seen at the barricades – to fight, according to their accusers, and to transport the wounded, according to themselves. One thing more is proven to me: that one of them is a mother, and that, at her death sentence, she said, "That's fine; but who will feed my child?"

I demand life for this child.

Let me pause for a moment.

"Who will feed my child?" The whole social wound is in that quote. I know that it was laughable for me to ask last week, in the face of the misfortunes of France, for unity among the French people, and I know that it will be laughable this week for me to demand life for the condemned. I am resigned to this. So here is a mother who is going to die, and here is a little child who will die too, as a consequence. Our justice has its successes. Is the mother guilty? Answer yes or no. Is the child? Try to answer yes.

— Victor Hugo, Depuis l'exil

Eulalie Papavoine died in the asylum of Châlons-sur-Marne on 24 May 1875.

== Legacy ==
Eulalie Papavoine was assimilated into the myth of the revolutionary prostitute, and also into the myth of the alleged arsonist "pétroleuse".

=== Myth of the revolutionary prostitute ===
I was delighted this morning by the story of Miss Papavoine, a pétroleuse, who serviced eighteen citizens in a single day in the middle of the barricades! That's stiff.

— Flaubert, Correspondance, 1871, p. 279

For academic Roger Bellet, Flaubert recalls a myth, developed after the French Revolution of 1848, of the iconic prostitute of the great revolutionary days, but diverts it. The living allegory of Liberty is no longer, for Flaubert, innocent: she is the terrifying symbol of the "public woman".

=== Myth of the pétroleuse ===
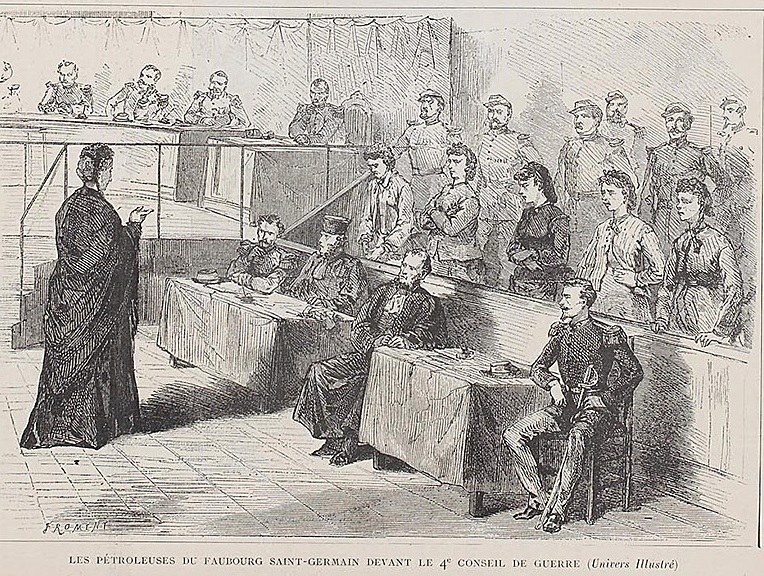
Trial of the pétroleuses of Saint-Germain, 1871 engraving – Archives Nationales.

Bertall, the caricaturist of the Second Empire, presented her in his series on the women of the Commune as "the anti-woman of the 19th century (neither a good mother nor a good wife), a hysteric who drank and smoked." The trial of Eulalie Papavoine and her co-accused was transcribed into serials in summer and fall of 1871. According to archivist Pierre Casselle, the accounts depicted the accused to elicit repulsion and not pity. Their physical portraits enhanced the moral indignity: "Rétiffe, Marchais, Bocquin, Suétens, Papavoine, are presented [...] with turned-up noses, vicious eyes, weasel-headed, with ribbons and dirty hair, and with faces ravaged by debauchery."

Louise Michel wrote in her Mémoires that an unfortunate homonym with the criminal Louis-Auguste Papavoine was the cause of her arrest: "Eulalie Papavoine was, by the accident of her name, condemned to forced labor; she was not even related to the legendary Papavoine, but they were too happy to make that name ring out."

According to Édith Thomas, "the repression did not only strike the combatants who were captured while bearing arms [...]. It struck at random. Any poor woman was suspect." Jean Jaurès also wrote that no proof could be found to link the accused pétroleuses to the fires.

A street in Savigny-le-Temple bears the name of Eulalie Papavoine.

== Bibliography ==
- Thomas, Édith (1963). Les Pétroleuses. La suite des temps (in French). Éditions Gallimard.
- Thomas, Édith (1966). The Women Incendiaries. Translated by Atkinson, James; Atkinson, Starr. New York: George Braziller, Inc.
