= Sabrina Calvo =

French writer (born 1974)

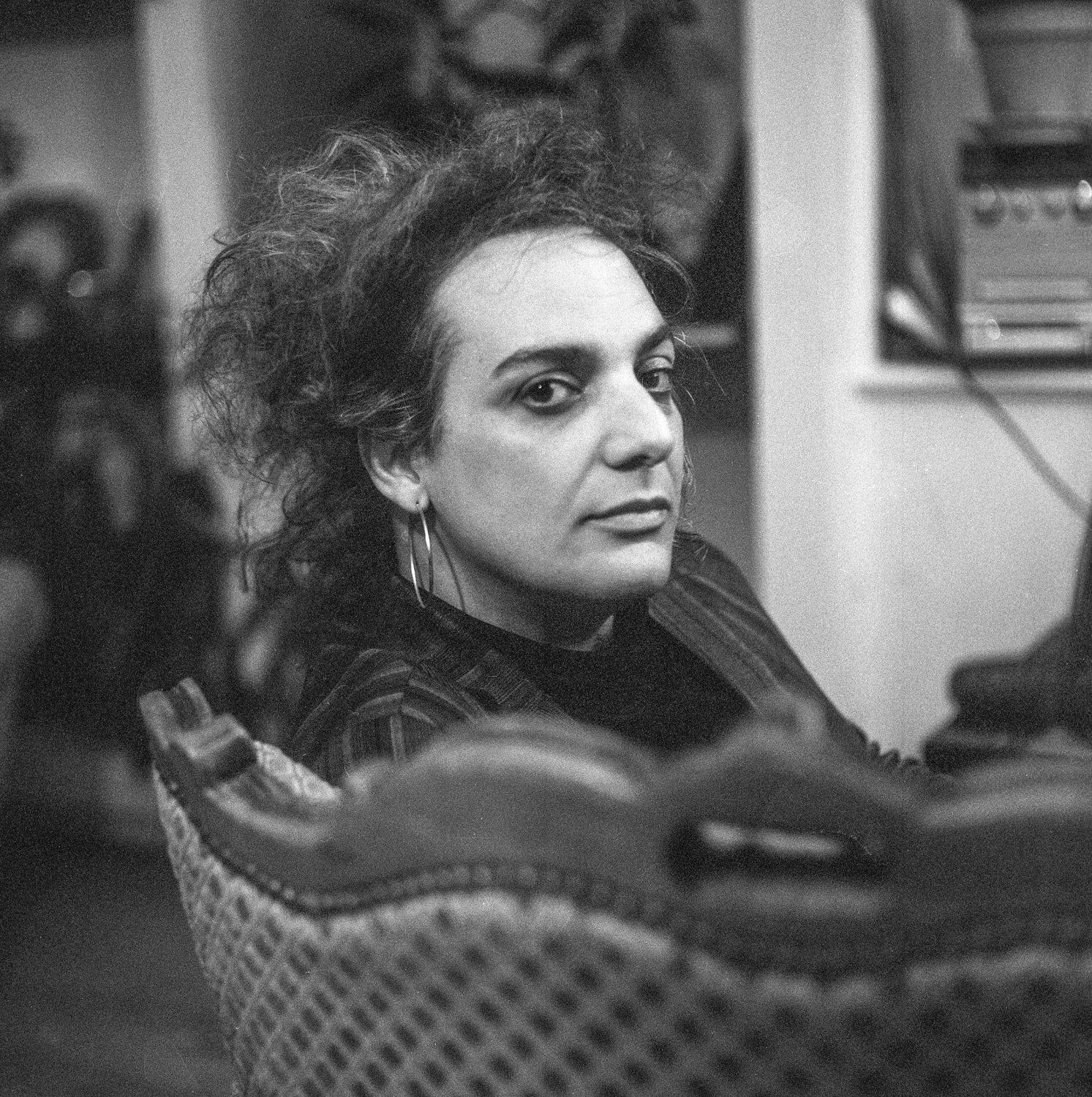
- Born: David Calvo; September 19, 1974 (age 51); Marseille
- Occupation: Writer

Sabrina Calvo (born 19 September 1974) is a French author of transfeminist science fiction, illustrator and games writer.

Calvo identifies as a transgender person, with her work published as "David Calvo" before 2018.

== Biography ==
Sabrina Calvo was born on 19 September 1974 in Marseille. She came out as trans in 2017 in the Mauvais Genre programme at the Utopiales festival. She lives between Paris and Montreal.

Sabrina Calvo is a writer and also a performance artist, and has collaborated with artists including Jeff Mills at the Musée du Louvre in 2015. She has given talks and round tables at the Chroniques Digital Arts Biennial, Mutek, Sonic Protest, Étonnants Voyageurs, les Utopiales, les Imaginales, les Intergalactiques and la Maison de la poésie, among others.

In 2021 she spoke out in favour of reforming sexist and toxic behaviour in the world of fantasy literature publishing.

Sabrina Calvo co-wrote the virtual reality drama 7 Lives, directed by Jan Kounen. 7 Lives is part of the 2019 VR selection at the Tribeca Film Festival.

=== Career in science fiction literature ===
Her first novel, Délius, une chanson d'été, was published in 1997. The book refers in particular to the composer Frederick Delius, and the title is taken from a song by Kate Bush, Delius (Song of Summer), which appeared on the album Never for Ever,

In 2004, based on a script by Sabrina Calvo, Thomas Azuélos drew Télémaque, in which the author's dreamlike world’ is expressed. In 2006, the duo published Akhénaton, co-written with Thomas Azuélos, tackling the subject of transidentity. ActuaBD described the work as

A radical album, with a minimalist and unbridled style, to be reserved for fans of absolute modernity

In 2015, Sabrina Calvo published Sous la Colline, a transfeminist urban fantasy novel exploring the intimate topography of Le Corbusier's Cité Radieuse in Marseille and exploiting the myths of the city. Her counter-dystopian novel Toxoplasma, featuring an anti-capitalist commune in Montreal and questioning gender identities, won the Grand Prix de l'Imaginaire in 2018.

==== Melmoth Furieux ====
She continued her exploration of these themes with Melmoth Furieux, an uchronia published in 2021, featuring an update of the Paris Commune in an alternative, policed and authoritarian present. In this novel, she takes her inspiration from Eulalie Papavoine, a dressmaker and ambulance driver during the Paris Commune, for the book's main character and narrator named Fi. Fi is a seamstress from Belleville whose brother, a Disney employee, set himself on fire during the inauguration of Disneyland in 1992, and who joins a self-managed commune in Belleville to organise the revolt against the militia. The book's title is a reference to Balzac's short story Melmoth réconcilié and Charles Robert Maturin's novel Melmoth ou l'Homme errant.

=== Analysis of her works ===
Her novels, often classified as science fiction, explore the geographical worlds of cities such as Marseille, Paris and Montreal, in a dystopian, dreamlike universe inspired by maps of places and revolutionary historical events from an anti-capitalist, anarchist and transfeminist perspective, at the crossroads between the genres of cyber punk and urban fantasy. She is cited as one of the emblematic authors of lesbian literature.

Sabrina Calvo's novels and productions have won awards. Her novel Wonderful won the 2002 Prix Julia-Verlanger. Sous la Colline won the 2016 Prix Bob-Morane, and Toxoplasma won the 2018 Grand Prix de l'Imaginaire and the Prix Rosny aîné the same year.

== Awards ==
- 2002: Prix Julia-Verlanger for Wonderful
- 2016: Prix Bob Morane for Sous la Colline
- 2018: Grand prix de l'Imaginaire for Toxoplasma
- 2018: Prix Rosny aîné for Toxoplasma

== Publications ==
- Délius, une chanson d'été. J'ai lu (Éd. rev. par l'auteur ed.). Paris: J'ai lu. 2003. ISBN 978-2-290-32563-6.
- La nuit des labyrinthes. J'ai lu. Paris: J'ai lu. 2004. ISBN 978-2-290-33356-3.
- Wonderful. Bragelonne. 2001. ISBN 9782914370042.
- Atomic Bomb, avec Fabrice Colin (2002, Ed. du Bélial)
- Calvo, Sabrina; Colin, Fabrice; Cremet, Arnaud (2005). Sunk. Lyon: les Moutons électriques. ISBN 978-2-915793-02-4.
- Minuscules flocons de neige depuis dix minutes. Lyon: les Moutons électriques. 2006. ISBN 978-2-915793-19-2.
- Elliot du néant. Clamart: la Volte. 2012. ISBN 978-2-917157-17-6.
- Sous la colline. Clamart: la Volte. 2015. ISBN 978-2-37049-012-4.
- Calvo, Sabrina (2017). Toxoplasma. La Volte. ISBN 9782370490544.

== Games ==
- Oniri Island, 2018
- The Inner Friend, 2018
