= Les Pétroleuses =

Les Pétroleuses may refer to:

- The Women Incendiaries, a 1963 history book about the Paris Commune
- The Legend of Frenchie King, a 1971 film
