= Joséphine Marchais =

Communard (1837–1874)

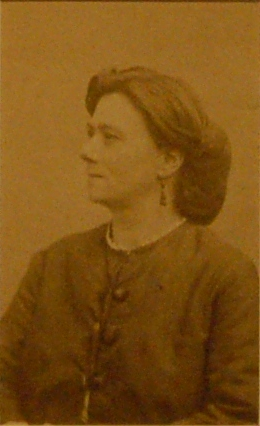
- Joséphine Marchais in 1871-1872.
- Born: Joséphine Rabier; April 13, 1837; Blois
- Died: February 20, 1874 (aged 36); Saint-Laurent-du-Maroni
- Occupations: Day labourer, communard
- Organization: Paris Commune
- Known for: Defendant in the trial of the pétroleuses

Joséphine Marguerite Marchais, née Rabier (13 April 1837 – 20 February 1874), was a French day labourer who was an active participant in the Paris Commune in 1871. Arrested while carrying weapons, she was condemned to death. Her sentence was commuted to forced labour, and she was deported to Guiana.

== Biography ==
Joséphine Marchais was born 13 April 1837 in Blois in Loir-et-Cher. She was from a disadvantaged background and had a difficult family situation. She herself spent six months in prison for theft, and her mother and sister were also incarcerated.

In 1871, during the Paris Commune, she was a vivandière in the Enfants Perdus, along with her lover, a butcher's assistant named Jean Guy. According to witnesses, she was at the barricade on the Rue de Lille on 22 and 23 May, with her rifle and Tyrolean hat; she was accused of looting, obscenity, and profanity, and was said to have declared, "if I am killed, I want to kill first!" Witnesses also said that she forced her lover to remain at the barricade when he wanted to desert.

She was arrested carrying weapons and red scarves, along with Élisabeth Rétiffe, Eulalie Papavoine and Léontine Suétens. She denied the charges, saying that she had only been near the barricade because she had been carrying laundry for the troops, but she was sentenced to death in September 1871. She was defended not by a lawyer, but by a lieutenant, Guinez, whose assertion that poverty was to blame for her participation in the Commune found sympathetic ears in the trial audience, but not in the Council of War. Her sentence was commuted on 27 November 1871 to forced labour in perpetuity.

She was taken to the penal colony in French Guiana, where she escaped the year following, on 20 November 1872. Recaptured on the 26th, she died in prison at Saint-Laurent-du-Maroni on 20 February 1874. The cause of her death is unknown, and the date is uncertain; according to another source, she could still have been living in 1885, married to a gendarme.

== Bibliography ==
- Thomas, Édith (1963). Les Pétroleuses. La suite des temps (in French). Éditions Gallimard.
- Thomas, Édith (1966). The Women Incendiaries. Translated by Atkinson, James; Atkinson, Starr. New York: George Braziller, Inc.
