= Maria Justeau =

WWII French Resistance member

Maria Justeau (1912–2008) was a member of the French Resistance during World War II. Along with her husband, Eugene Justeau, she saved the lives of many American, Canadian, and French soldiers in the area of Saint-Seglin, Brittany, France. She is among the few women to have received the "Croix de Guerre". She was also awarded an official recognition from the SAS parachutists.

== Eugene Justeau ==
Maria and Eugene had a mill at the location called "Le Pont" (the Bridge). The mill was between Saint-Seglin and Pipriac and is still standing. Eugene had been injured and captured by the Germans. He was able to escape back to his home. When the Germans came to look for him, Maria pretended that she didn't know where her husband was and introduced her husband as a day laborer.

Eugene instead participated in the Resistance. Capitaine Toqué, Louis Nadan, Louis Bourgeais, SAS parachutists, and Eugene took part in many sabotages in the region. After the war, he was awarded the "Legion d'Honneur" and a "Lieutenant" grade for his heroic actions.

== Battlin Bobbie ==
Battlin Bobbie was an American B-17 bomber that had been shot down in September 1943 by the Germans at Messac. The pilot, Elton Hoyt, and 9 other Americans escaped from the plane before it crashed. Hoyt and 3 comrades were hidden by Justeau at the mill for 3 weeks. In September 2002, he came back to the mill to thank the local population, including Maria Justeau.

== General Allard ==
General Jean-Claude Allard was the subdivision chief of the secret army. He escaped the Gestapo on November 30, 1943, and had a brief stay at the mill.

== Saint Marcel Fighters ==
During the Battle of Saint Marcel (18 June 1944), which involved 200 Free French SAS parachutists and 3,000 fighters from the Maquis, more than 20 parachutists were hidden at the mill during the battle. Maria and Eugene Justeau kept the mill running while feeding the French soldiers and taking care of 3 children.

== Life ==
Justeau died in 2008 after raising alone her three children after her husband's death. She spent her last years in her little house. She never talked about what happened during World War II with her descendants.
