= Sophie Poirier =

French communard

- Born: March 18, 1830; Troissy, France
- Died: April 2, 1875 (aged 45); Rouen, France

Sophie Poirier (1830–1875) was a French seamstress and, during the Paris Commune, a communard. She started a seamstress co-operative with profit sharing during the 1870 Siege of Paris. It closed before the rise of the Commune. She chaired the Montmartre Vigilance Committee during this time, where she worked with Louise Michel. Poirier also founded the Boule Noire women's political club, which voted for the arrest of archbishop Georges Darboy and the destruction of the Vendôme Column. After the fall of the Commune, Poirier was deported to a penal colony. She died in custody in Rouen in 1875.
