= Louise Michel (biography) =

1971 biography by Édith Thomas

- Author: Édith Thomas
- Original title: Louise Michel, ou la Velléda de l'anarchie
- Language: French
- Subject: Biography
- Publisher: Gallimard
- Publication date: 1971
- English publication date: 1980
- Pages: 475

Louise Michel is a 1971 biography of Louise Michel by Édith Thomas. Originally published by Gallimard in French, Penelope Williams translated the biography into English in 1980.
