= Pétroleuses =

French revolutionary female arsonists

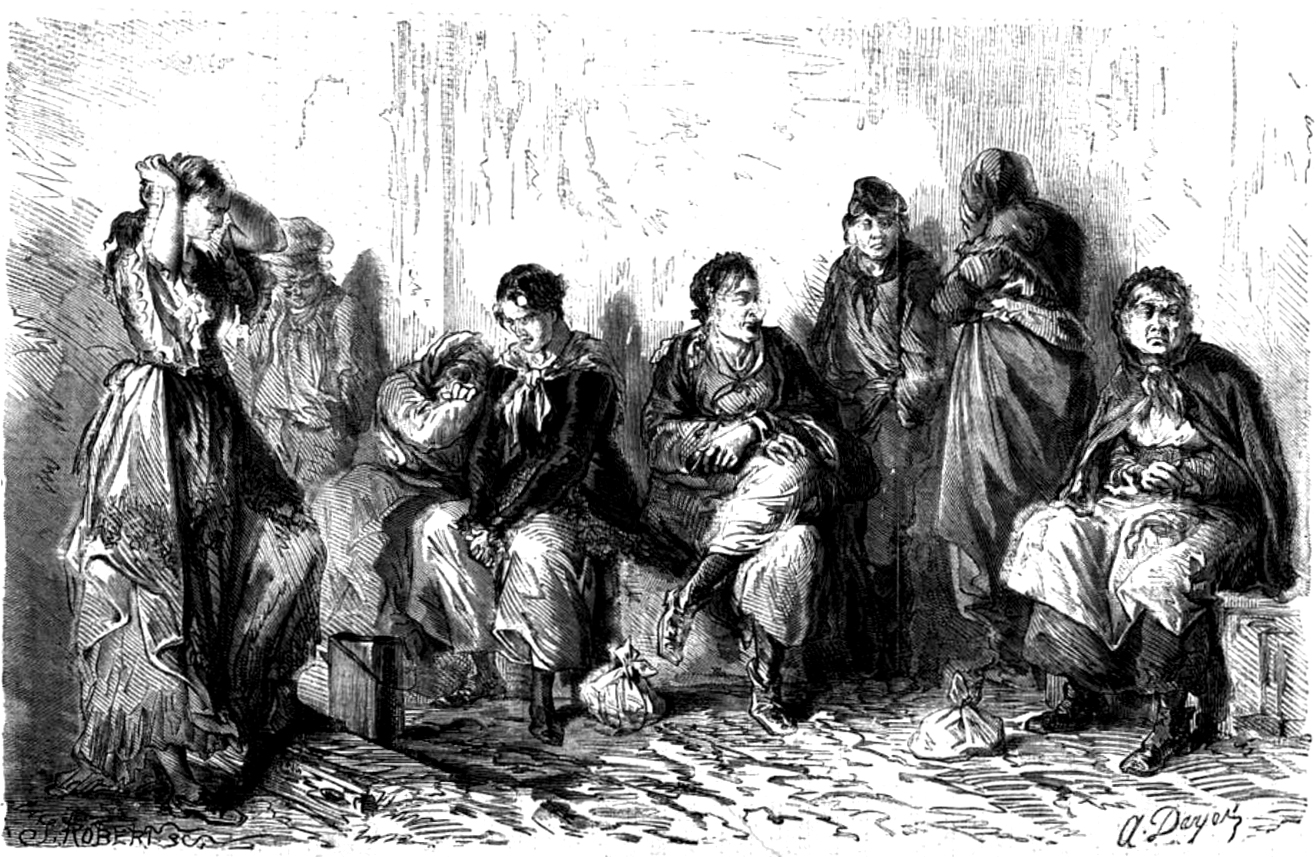
Pétroleuses arrested in Versailles

Pétroleuses were, according to popular rumours at the time, female supporters of the Paris Commune, accused of burning down much of Paris during the last days of the Commune in May 1871. During May, when Paris was being recaptured by loyalist Versaillais troops, rumours circulated that lower-class women were committing arson against private property and public buildings, using bottles full of petroleum or paraffin (similar to modern-day Molotov cocktails) which they threw into cellar windows, in a deliberate act of spite against the government. Many Parisian buildings, including the Hôtel de Ville, the Tuileries Palace, the Palais de Justice and many other government buildings were in fact set afire by the soldiers of the Commune during the last days of the Commune, prompting the press and Parisian public opinion to blame the pétroleuses.

== Background ==
During the Bloody Week at the end of the Commune, many Paris landmarks were set on fire by the Communards, most notably the Hotel de Ville, the Palais de Justice, the Tuileries Palace, the Palais d'Orsay, and other government buildings, as well as the commercial docks along the Seine and some private homes, including the residence of the writer Prosper Mérimée, who had died before the Commune, but was accused of supporting Napoleon III. Some later accounts blamed the fires on "pétroleuses", or female arsonists. However, the history of the Paris Commune by Maxime Du Camp, written in the 1870s, and more recent research by historians of the Paris Commune, including Robert Tombs and Gay Gullickson, long ago debunked this myth and concluded that there were no incidents of deliberate arson by pétroleuses. The buildings destroyed at the end of the Commune were burned by the soldiers of the Commune, who proudly claimed credit for it afterwards. The Commune soldiers, led by Paul Brunel, one of the original leaders of the Commune, took cans of oil and set fire to the Tuileries Palace, and buildings near the Rue Royale and the Rue du Faubourg Saint-Honoré. Following the example set by Brunel, guardsmen set fire to dozens of other buildings on Rue Saint-Florentin, Rue de Rivoli, Rue de Bac, Rue de Lille, and other streets. Some buildings along the Rue de Rivoli were burned down during street-fighting between Communards and Versaillais troops. The arsonists also targeted the cathedral of Notre Dame de Paris for burning. The furniture had been piled together inside the cathedral to start the fire, but the arson was cancelled when it was realised that the fire would inevitably spread to the neighbouring Hôtel-Dieu hospital, where hundreds of patients were sheltered.

== Trials ==
Many individual women were accused of carrying kerosene or setting fires, but two group trials were particularly important. The first trial of the "pétroleuses" began on 3 September 1871. Five women were accused of various crimes, including having been involved in the fires along the Rue de Lille and at the Légion d'Honneur: Élizabeth Rétiffe, Joséphine Marchais, Léontine Suétens, Eulalie Papavoine, and Lucie Bocquin. They had been armed, and some wore the uniform of the National Guard. Despite a complete lack of evidence that any of them participated in the fires, Rétiffe, Marchais, and Suétens were sentenced to death, Papavoine to deportation to a walled fortress, and Bocquin to ten years of solitary confinement. The death sentences were later commuted to forced labour for life in French Guiana.

A second trial of pétroleuses occurred on 16 April 1872. The accused were Anne-Marie Ménand, Florence Van de Walle, and Aurore Machu. The three women had been with the National Guard troops who fought at the barricades of Rue Royale and the Faubourg Saint-Honoré on 22-23 May. After that battle, the National Guard lit several fires, and Rue Royale, the Place de la Concorde, and the Tuileries burned. Ménand, Van de Walle, and Machu were accused of having taken part in setting the fires. According to Édith Thomas, of the many women who were accused of being pétroleuses in the aftermath of the Commune, Anne-Marie Ménand and Florence Van de Walle were the only two who may actually have participated in any arson.

A partial amnesty was granted to people who were prosecuted for their role in the commune on 3 March 1879, followed by a general amnesty on 11 July 1880. Marchais and Papavoine died before the amnesties.

== Myth ==
Regarding the pétroleuses themselves, the negative connotation applied to the name was a prime result of the fear many men in higher ranks felt during the Paris Commune. The fear in question was that women could take advantage of the current revolution to alter gender norms and seek elevation in the societal hierarchy. As a result, news of pétroleuses that were captured and punished was heavily publicized. It would serve as a warning to the remainder of French women that, "she would be killed as an example to other woman of what they could expect if they stepped out of the proper female role."

== Namegiving ==
The feminist punk rock band Petrol Girls, based in London since 2012, take their name from the Pétroleuses.

== Bibliography ==
- Robert Tombs, The War Against Paris: 1871, Cambridge University Press, 1981, 272 pages ISBN 978-0-521-28784-5
- Gay Gullickson, Unruly Women of Paris, Cornell Univ Press, 1996, 304 pages ISBN 978-0-8014-8318-9
- Rougerie, Jacques, La Commune de 1871, (1988), Presses Universitaires de France, ISBN 978-2-13-062078-5.
- Oliver Lissagaray, The Paris Commune, (1876)
- Thomas, Édith (1963). Les Pétroleuses. La suite des temps (in French). Éditions Gallimard.
- Thomas, Édith (1966). The Women Incendiaries. Translated by Atkinson, James; Atkinson, Starr. New York: George Braziller, Inc.
