= Maurice Dommanget =

French historian (1888–1976)

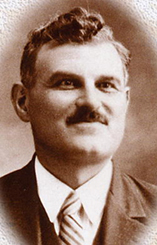
- Dommanget in the 1920s
- Born: January 14, 1888; Paris
- Died: April 2, 1976 (aged 88); Senlis

Maurice Dommanget (1888–1976) was a French historian of labor and socialist movements.

Daniel Guérin described Dommanget as "renowned for his tireless erudition".
