= Saint-Séglin =

Saint-Séglin Saent-Segelein (Gallo) Sant-Sewenn (Breton)
- Commune
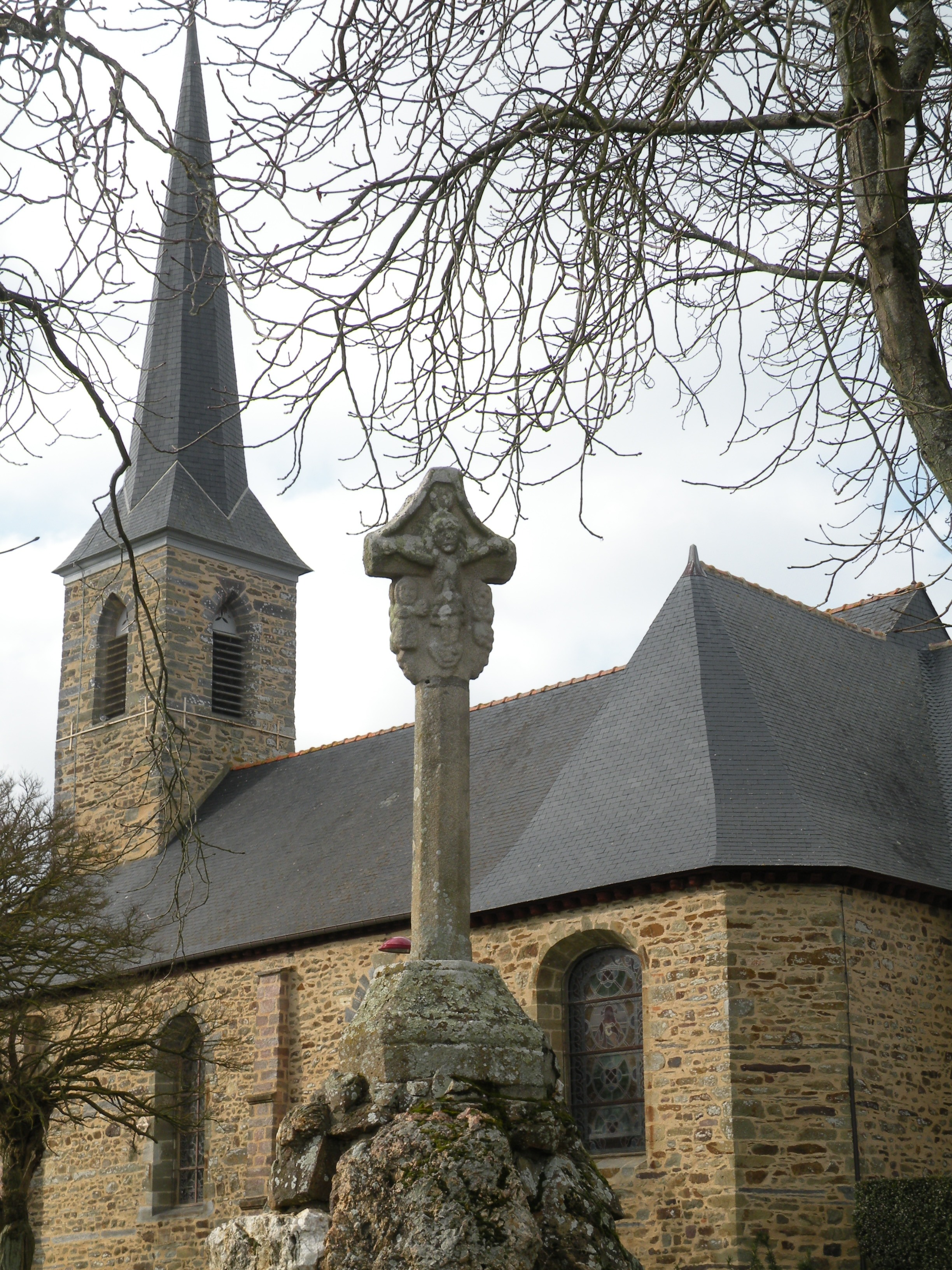
- Church and calvary of Saint-Séglin
- Location of Saint-Séglin
- Location within France Location within Brittany
- Coordinates: 47°51′15″N 2°00′12″W
- Country: France
- Region: Brittany
- Department: Ille-et-Vilaine
- Arrondissement: Redon
- Canton: Guichen

Government
  - Mayor (2020–2026): Marie Monvoisin
- Area^{1}: 9.40 km^{2} (3.63 sq mi)
- Highest elevation: 74 m (243 ft)
- Lowest elevation: 12 m (39 ft)
- Population (2023): 610
  - Density: 65/km^{2} (170/sq mi)
- Time zone: UTC+01:00 (CET)
  - Summer (DST): UTC+02:00 (CEST)
- INSEE/Postal code: 35311 /35330
- ^{1} French Land Register data, which excludes lakes, ponds, glaciers > 1 km^{2} (0.386 sq mi or 247 acres) and river estuaries.

Saint-Séglin (French pronunciation: [sɛ̃ seɡlɛ̃]; Breton: Sant-Sewenn; Gallo: Saent-Segelein) is a commune in the Ille-et-Vilaine department in Brittany in northwestern France.

== Population ==
Inhabitants of Saint-Séglin are called Séglinois in French.

Historical population
Year	Pop.	±% p.a.
1968	512	—
1975	495	−0.48%
1982	411	−2.62%
1990	409	−0.06%
1999	433	+0.64%
2007	459	+0.73%
2012	503	+1.85%
2017	566	+2.39%
2023	610	+1.26%
Source: INSEE

== See also ==
- Communes of the Ille-et-Vilaine department
- Maria Justeau
