= Louis Rossel =

French army officer and politician (1844–1871)

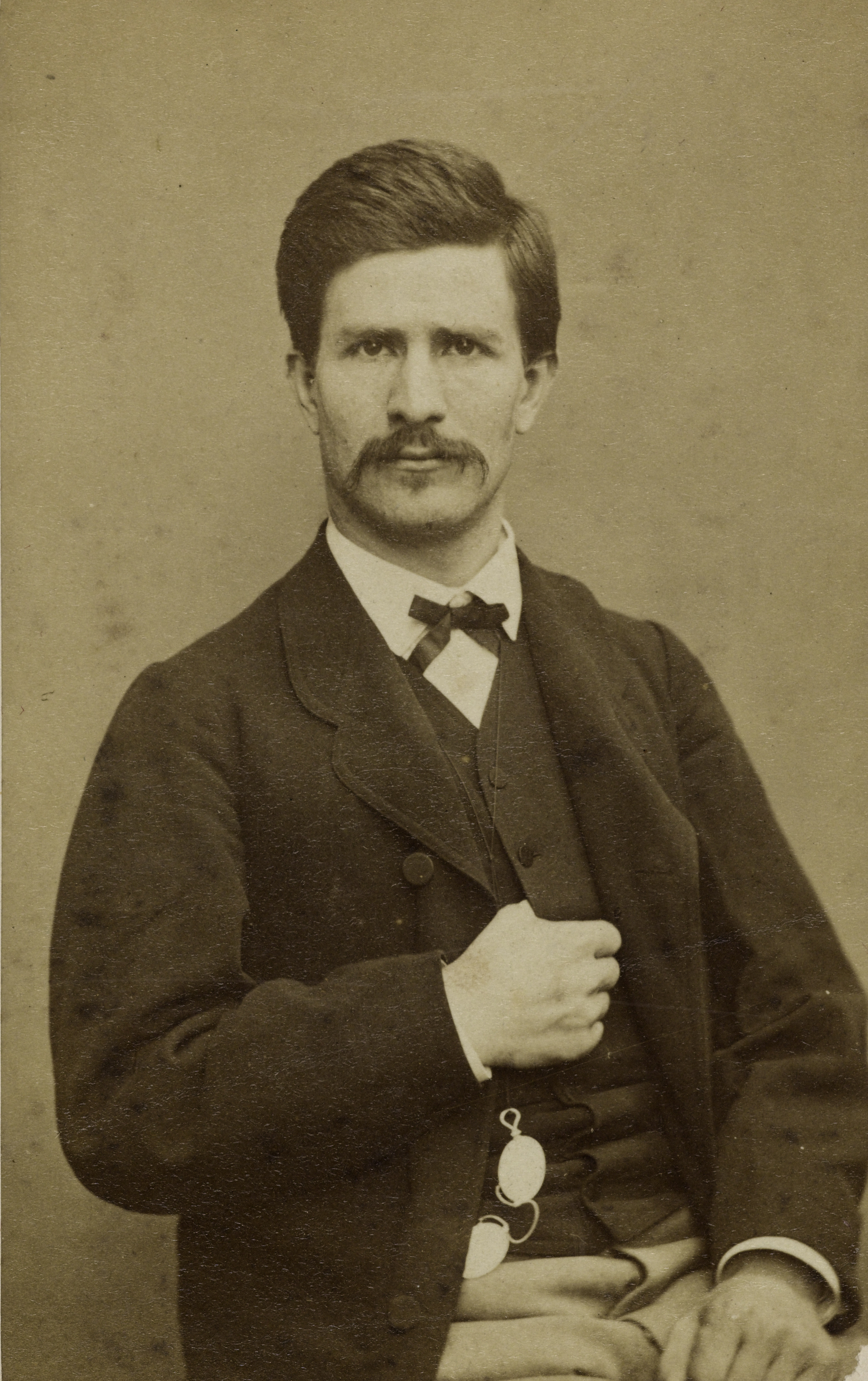
- Born: 9 September 1844; Saint-Brieuc, France
- Died: 28 November 1871 (aged 27); Versailles, France
- Burial place: Protestant Cemetery of Nimes, Nîmes, France
- Military career
- Allegiance: French Republic; Paris Commune
- Branch: French Army
- Service years: 1864 – 1871
- Rank: Colonel
- Conflicts: Franco Prussian War; Paris Commune
- Other work: Minister of War

Louis Rossel (9 September 1844 – 28 November 1871) was a French army officer and a politician. On 19 March 1871, he became the only senior French officer to join up with the Paris Commune, playing an important role as Minister of War.

== Biography ==
Louis-Nathaniel Rossel was born on 9 September 1844 in Saint-Brieuc, Côtes-d'Armor, but his father was a scion of a strongly republican Huguenot (Protestant) Nîmes family, and descended from Saint-Jean-du-Gard Camisards. His mother, born Sarah Campbell, was from Scotland. Rossel was educated at the Prytanée Militaire. He was executed on 28 November 1871 at the Satory military centre at Versailles.

When Rossel became Minister of War, replacing Gustave Paul Cluseret after the abandonment of Fort Issy, he immediately ordered the construction of a new ring of barricades within the existing ramparts in case the Government forces penetrated the first line of defense. Rossel also tried to concentrate and centralize the 1,100 artillery pieces scattered throughout the city. Many were out of commission with their breechblocks stored in arsenals elsewhere in Paris, so that the only readily available guns were light pieces that fared poorly against the Government's heavy artillery. Furthermore, Rossel began work within the city on three citadels: at the Trocadero, on Montmartre, and at the Pantheon on the Left Bank. Here, the Communards would be able to make a final stand, if necessary. He put the defense of the city ramparts under the direct tactical command of a pair of his most talented Polish emigres, youthful veterans of the 1863 Polish rebellion. These were men accustomed to desperate fighting against hopeless odds. Recognizing that a purely passive defense would enable the Government forces to mass at any given point, Rossel developed a plan to organize National Guard battalions into "combat groups," each of five battalions, commanded by a colonel, and supported by some 40 guns. Unfortunately, the National Guard units remained suspicious of central direction and for the most part refused to serve in parts of Paris other than those in which they lived.

On 9 May 1871 Rossel resigned from his position after a tenure of nine days, despairing of the barren prolonged deliberations of the Commune, which precluded any serious action. He was replaced by Charles Delescluze.

After the fall of the Commune, Rossel fled and lived for a short while under an assumed identity. He was later apprehended and executed by a firing squad on 28 November 1871.

I shall never regret having tried to demolish that bastard oligarchy, the French bourgeoisie. We may have been beaten, but nevertheless our cannon shots have told; and I hope that the cause of democracy may find, at some future period, less unworthy and less incapable servants than ourselves.

— Louis Rossel. From a letter written before his execution.
