= Comité de vigilance de Montmartre =

Political organization during the Paris Commune

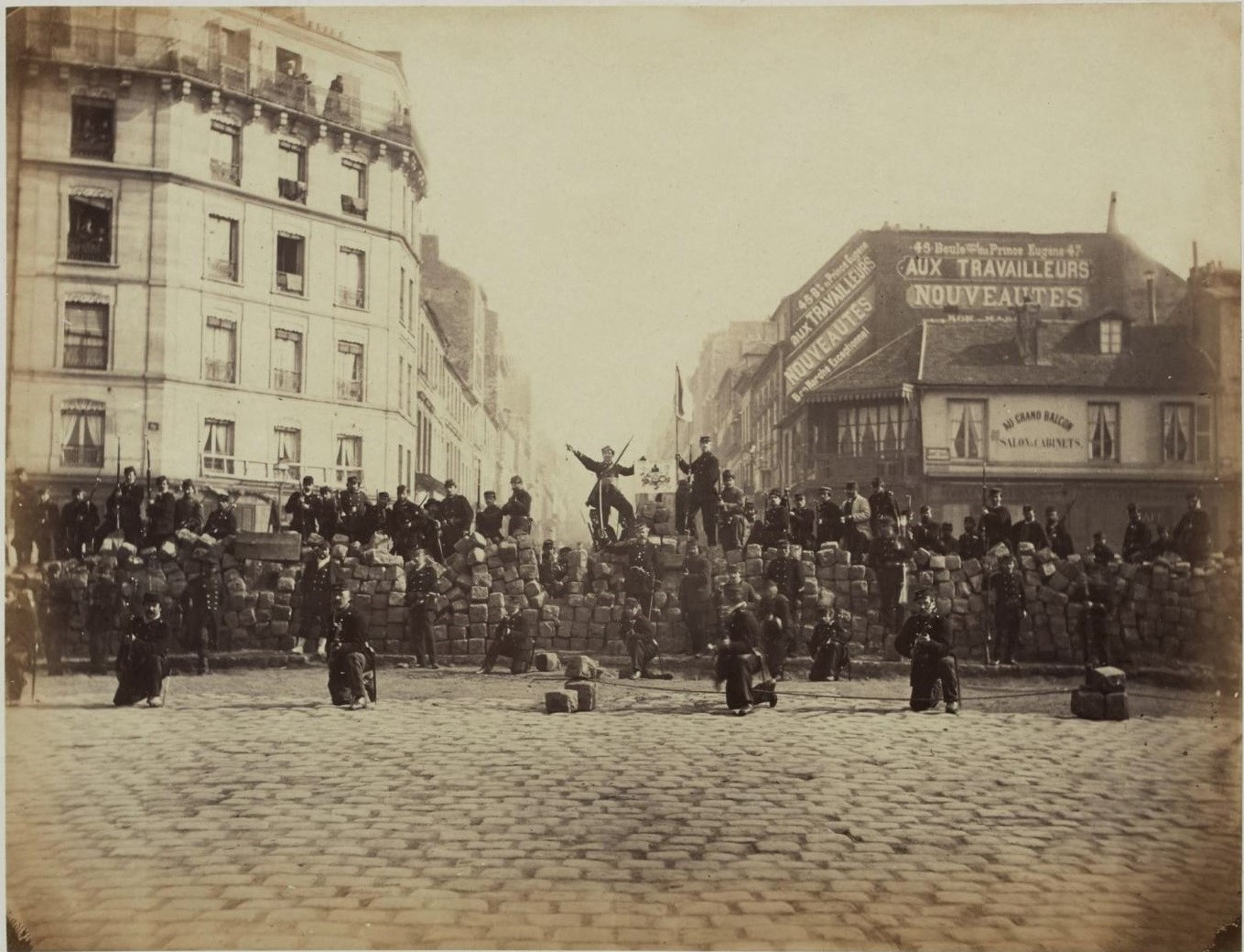
A barricade thrown up on 18 March 1871.

The Vigilance Committee of Montmartre (Comité de Vigilance de Montmartre) was a political association and provisional administrative organization established on the Rue de Clignancourt shortly before the Siege of Paris (1870–1871). Closely affiliated with the International Workingman's Association, its members had strong connections with the various anarchist and socialist tendencies of the time, particularly those represented by Karl Marx, Mikhail Bakunin, and Auguste Blanqui.

The declaration of the Third Republic in Paris on 4 September 1870 signaled the almost immediate flowering of political clubs. Acting as poles of coordination, discussion, and preparation, these clubs and committees would come to play a significant role in the establishment, development, and defense of the future Paris Commune. On 15 September, twenty of these committees organized themselves around a common program. Beyond simple agitation, they also contributed to the administration of the various arrondissements during the chaotic siege of Paris. The most notoriously radical of these committees was the Comité de Vigilance de XVIIIe Arrondissement, or better known as the Comité de Vigilance de Montmartre.

Composed of militants drawn from almost every segment of the radical spectrum, the Committee of Vigilance included such notable figures as Louise Michel, who would become known as a feminist, writer, and anarchist; Théophile Ferré, an elected member of the Paris Commune who later issued a call for the burning of the Finance ministry and ordered the execution of six hostages, including the archbishop of Paris, in retaliation for the summary execution of countless communards by the Versailles government; Paule Minck, a feminist organizer responsible for the founding of a free school at the Church of Saint Pierre de Montmartre; Anne Jaclard, a member of the Russian section of the International Workingman’s Association, and a co-founder of the radical newspaper La Social; and Jules-Henri-Marius Bergeret, a leading spirit of the Committee and the revolutionary movement as a whole.

Montmartre, which was officially incorporated into Paris as an arrondissement only in 1860, had long been free of both the Parisian tax system as well as stringent police authority, transforming it into a haven for nonconformists, criminals, and dissenters. Consequently, it provided fertile ground for the emergence of the most radical worker’s clubs and political action committees. The defeat of the French Army and the humiliating armistice negotiated by that Republic in January 1871 produced an atmosphere of anger and resent that hovered over all of Paris. Having sacrificed so much for the defense of the capital, Parisian workers vehemently criticized the new Third Republic and the conservatives and monarchists that composed it. This largely spontaneous surge of popular political activity further galvanized the committees growing around the city. An insurrection was imminent.

The Vigilance Committee of Montmartre, well prepared for the much expected popular revolution, played a crucial role in the successful defense of the cannon stored on the Butte Montmartre, the event that ignited the civil war and the subsequent establishment of the Commune. But these committees were far from standard militias: even before 18 March, respective committees began to supervise the various arrondissements, secularizing and expanding education, assisting in the management of governmental affairs, contributing to the organization of the city’s defense, providing social services and relief, spreading propaganda, and facilitating communication. In many ways, the committees exemplified the Communard principle of federal association. Too difficult to manage the entire city alone, the Commune’s very existence necessitated the coordination of decentralized committees.

But despite their important role in the history of the Commune, the committees often found themselves lagging behind the surging tide of popular revolution. On 18 March, after having given orders to fire on the crowd gathered at the Butte, General Claude Lecomte, the officer sent to retrieve the cannons and restore order, was himself arrested by his own men and quickly escorted to the nearby prison. Notified of the potentially explosive situation, the Vigilance Committee of Montmartre immediately sent an order to the commander of the National Guard responsible for the General, warning the commander to maintain control and to guard the prisoner until he could be put on trial. But the matter was already out of their hands. The enraged crowd demanded the General’s death and his own soldiers threw him against a wall and shot him down. The Commune, then, was the product of both organization and spontaneity.

The Committee continued to operate right up to the very end of the Commune, many of its members fighting and dying on the barricades. The survivors were either executed, like Théophile Ferré, or, like Louise Michel, forced into exile.
