= Élisabeth Rétiffe =

French cardboard maker socialist activist

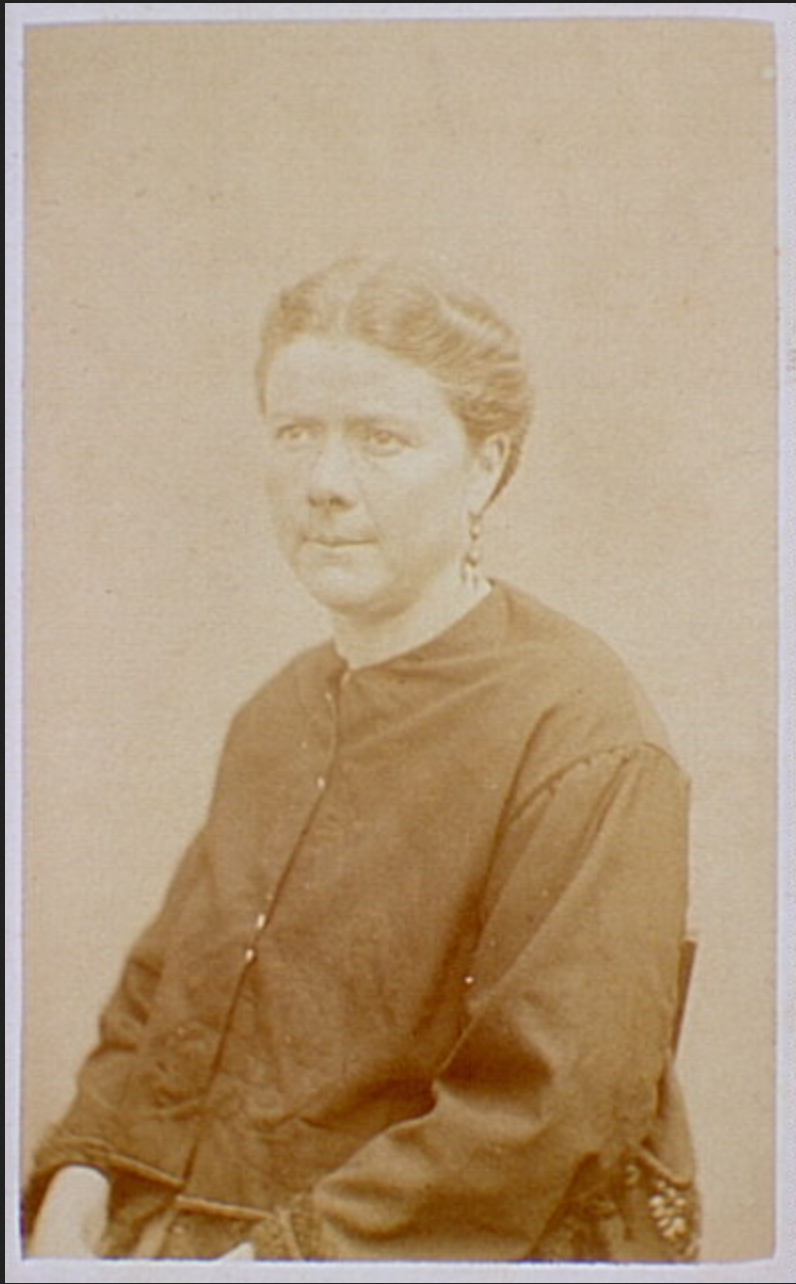
- Born: Rose Rétif; January 9, 1834
- Died: February 24, 1882 (aged 48)
- Occupations: Cardboard maker, socialist activist, ambulance worker

Élisabeth Rétiffe (born Rose Rétif, January 9, 1834, in Vézelise, died February 24, 1882, in Saint-Laurent-du-Maroni) was a French cardboard maker, socialist activist, ambulance worker and communard. She was condemned to death for her action during the Paris Commune, where she was sentenced to perform hard labor before she was deported to Guyana.

== Biography ==
Earning her living as a cardboard maker, she decided to help those who were needy in Paris. Her strong temper had her sentenced in 1853 for assault and battery against another woman, and in 1855 for contempt of officers. During the insurrection of the Paris Commune in 1871, she became an ambulance driver and declared that she would have treated the people as well as the communards.

Witnesses claim to have seen her in May 1871 among the troops of the Communards of Belleville wearing the red scarf and a rifle slung over her shoulder. She is also accused of being a "petroleuse" and guilty of arson.

While she denied these accusations, she was condemned to death on September 4, 1871, by the 4th Council of War. Her sentence being commuted on November 27, 1871, to forced labor, she was deported to Guyana. When she was deported, she met a fellow prisoner Jean Berthonier, whom she married.
