= Édith Thomas =

French novelist, archivist, historian and journalist (1909–1970)

- Born: 23 January 1909; Montrouge, France
- Died: 7 December 1970 (aged 61); Paris, France
- Education: École des chartes
- Occupation: Archivist
- Writing career
- Pen name: Jean Le Guern, Auxois
- Genres: novels, women's history
- Notable awards: Prix du Premier Roman

Édith Thomas (23 January 1909 – 7 December 1970) was a French novelist, archivist, historian, and journalist.

A bisexual pioneer of women's history, she reputedly inspired a character of the erotic novel Story of O.

== Career ==
Thomas was born in Montrouge, and studied at the École des chartes, from which she graduated in 1931.

In 1933, her first novel, La Mort de Marie (Mary's Death), was awarded the Prix du Premier Roman. A few years later she quit her job to become a journalist at Ce Soir, a left-wing evening newspaper close to the Popular Front government. She also contributed to various magazines (Vendredi, Europe, Regards) for which she covered the Spanish Civil War on the Republican side.

During World War II, she joined the Résistance and became a member of the French Communist Party in 1942. She wrote a series of short stories under male pseudonyms (Jean Le Guern, Auxois), published on clandestine press by Les Editions de Minuit in 1943, under the title Contes d'Auxois.

After the War, she returned to her first profession and took a position as curator at the Archives nationales. She then became a pioneer of women's history in France, working mainly on feminism during the 19th century and on significant female figures such as Joan of Arc, Pauline Roland, Louise Michel and George Sand. She left the Communist Party in 1949.

Thomas died in Paris in 1970, at the age of 61.

== Personal life ==
Although Thomas declared herself heterosexual, she had her most enduring affair with a woman. In 1946, aged 37, she met translator and editor Anne Desclos, aged 39, through literary critic and publisher Jean Paulhan, director of the prestigious literary magazine Nouvelle Revue Française. Paulhan and Thomas had met at the beginning of the war, and both had been members of the Comité national des écrivains (Writers' National Committee), an intellectual Résistance group led by Louis Aragon. Desclos, a bisexual, was Paulhan's employee and lover. The two women began having a passionate liaison.

In 1954, Paulhan, an admirer of the Marquis de Sade, made to Desclos the remark that no woman was capable of writing an erotic novel. To prove him wrong, Desclos wrote a graphic, sadomasochistic novel as a series of love letters to him. Prompted by Paulhan, she agreed to publish it under the pen name Pauline Réage. Titled Story of O (Histoire d'O.), it sparked off huge controversy and was an enormous commercial success. After much speculation, Desclos publicly admitted that she was the author only 40 years later, and suggested that Thomas inspired her to create some characters, especially the one of Anne-Marie.

== Works ==
- La mort de Marie. Gallimard, 1934, OCLC 12261585

=== Works in English ===
- The Women Incendiaries, G. Braziller, 1966 OCLC 401383
  - The Women Incendiaries, Translators James Atkinson, Starr Atkinson, Haymarket Books, 2007, ISBN 9781931859462
- Eve and the Others, Continental Editions, 1976, ISBN 9780916868017
- Louise Michel, Gallimard, 1971; Black Rose Books, 1980
