= The Women Incendiaries =

1963 book by Édith Thomas on the 1871 Paris Commune

- Author: Édith Thomas
- Subject: French history
- Published: 1963 (Gallimard)
- Pages: 274

The Women Incendiaries is a historical account of the role of women during the 1871 Paris Commune, written by French historian Édith Thomas. The book was first published in French in 1963 as Les Pétroleuses and translated into English in 1966 by James and Starr Atkinson. The history puts special emphasis on the role of Louise Michel in the Commune's events.

The librarian trade publication Library Journal's review wrote that the book's contemporary—the 1966 The Fall of Paris: The Siege and the Commune by Alistair Horne—was more interesting with the same subject matter. As a result, the reviewer concluded that Thomas's book would have a smaller audience. The Atlantic's reviewer, however, praised Thomas's memorable characters. Both reviewers noted Thomas's positivity towards the Commune's events, a position one put as "impassioned indignation".
