= Louis Charles Delescluze =

French journalist (1809–1871)

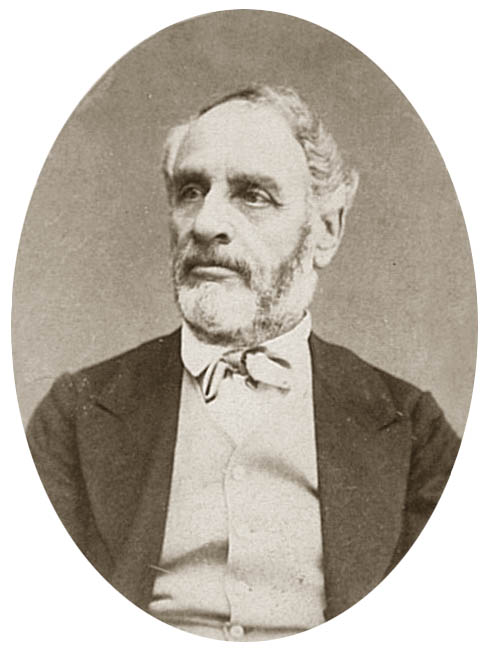
- Born: 2 October 1809; Dreux, Eure-et-Loir, France
- Died: 25 May 1871 (aged 61); Paris, France
- Occupations: Revolutionary; journalist; lawyer; military commander
- Known for: Leading the Paris Commune

Signature
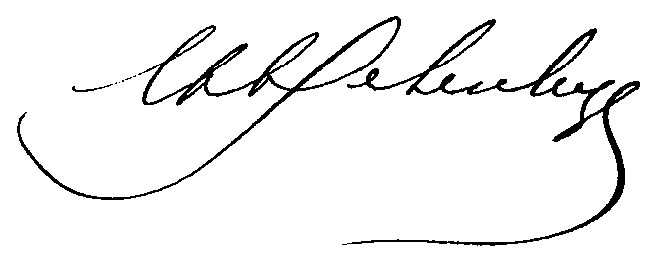

Louis Charles Delescluze (French pronunciation: [lwi ʃaʁl dəleklyz]; 2 October 1809 – 25 May 1871) was a French revolutionary leader, journalist, and military commander of the Paris Commune.

== Biography ==
=== Early life ===
Delescluze was born at Dreux, Eure-et-Loir. He studied law in Paris, and became a member of several secret republican societies. He also took part in the July revolution of 1830 which overthrew the Bourbon monarchy and placed King Louis-Philippe into power. In 1836, he was forced to take refuge in Belgium, where he devoted himself to republican journalism.

He returned to France in 1840 and settled in Valenciennes. After the revolution of 1848, which toppled Louis-Philippe and created the Second French Republic, he moved to Paris, where he started a newspaper called La Révolution démocratique et sociale (The Democratic and Social Revolution), and founded the revolutionary organization named Solidarité républicaine. In June 1848 he and other revolutionaries made a failed attempt to overthrow the government of the new Republic, which was swiftly and violently repressed by the army under General Louis-Eugène Cavaignac. In March 1849 he was arrested and sentenced to one year in prison for criticising Cavaignac. He was arrested again in April 1850, and sentenced to three years in prison; after which he fled from France to England. He returned secretly to France in 1853, but was arrested and condemned to ten years of prison and exile. He served his sentence at the prisons of Saint-Pelagie, Belle-Île, Carte and finally at Devil's Island in French Guiana. Throughout his six-year imprisonment, he composed a memoir that, in 1869, was published in Paris as De Paris à Cayenne, Journal d'un transporté (From Paris to Cayenne, diary of a transport).

In 1859, he and other political prisoners were granted amnesty by Emperor Napoleon III and in November 1860 he returned to France, weakened by illness. His next venture was the publication of the Réveil, a radical newspaper supporting the new socialist International Workingmen's Association, which was founded in 1864. This journal brought him three condemnations, a fine and imprisonment in a single year, was finally suppressed; and he again fled to Belgium.

=== Paris Commune ===
The rapid defeat of the French Army in the 1870 Franco-German War and capture of the Emperor at the Battle of Sedan brought a sudden end to the Second Empire and the proclamation of the French Republic. The new government, headquartered in Bordeaux, tried to continue the war. On 8 September, Delescluze returned to Paris and plunged back into revolutionary politics, agitating against the new national government. In November 1870, he was mayor of the working-class 19th arrondissement. The Germans surrounded Paris and began a long siege and began a bombardment of the city. On 28 January 1871, after the city had suffered thousands of deaths from starvation and disease, the Government of National Defense signed an armistice with the Germans. Delescluze's denounced the armistice and called for an armed struggle against the Government of National Defense. The revolutionaries tried unsuccessfully to seize the Hotel de Ville, and Delescluze's newspaper was briefly closed down.

On 18 March, the French army attempted to remove a large number of cannons stored in a depot on the heights of Montmartre but they were blocked by soldiers of the Paris National Guard. The soldiers seized and killed two French Army generals, Claude Lecomte and Jacques Léon Clément-Thomas. The revolutionary leaders of Paris, including Delescluze, swiftly organized elections for a new revolutionary government, called the Paris Commune. Half of Parisians, mostly those in the more wealthy neighborhoods in the west of the city, abstained, but those in the working-class east voted in large numbers. On 26 March Delescluze was elected a member of the Commune from the 11th and 19th arrondissements, and resigned his seat in the National Assembly. On 27 March the Commune was formally proclaimed.

==== Revolutionary leader ====
Delescluze, because of his prestige and long revolutionary career, soon became a member of the major committees of the Commune; the foreign relations commission, the executive commission (4 April); the Committee of Public Safety (9 May) and, although he had no military experience, the civilian delegate of the War Committee (11 May), which made him effectively the military leader of the Commune. French explorer Théodore Ber, who had come back from Peru to support the Commune, became Delescluze’s personal secretary.

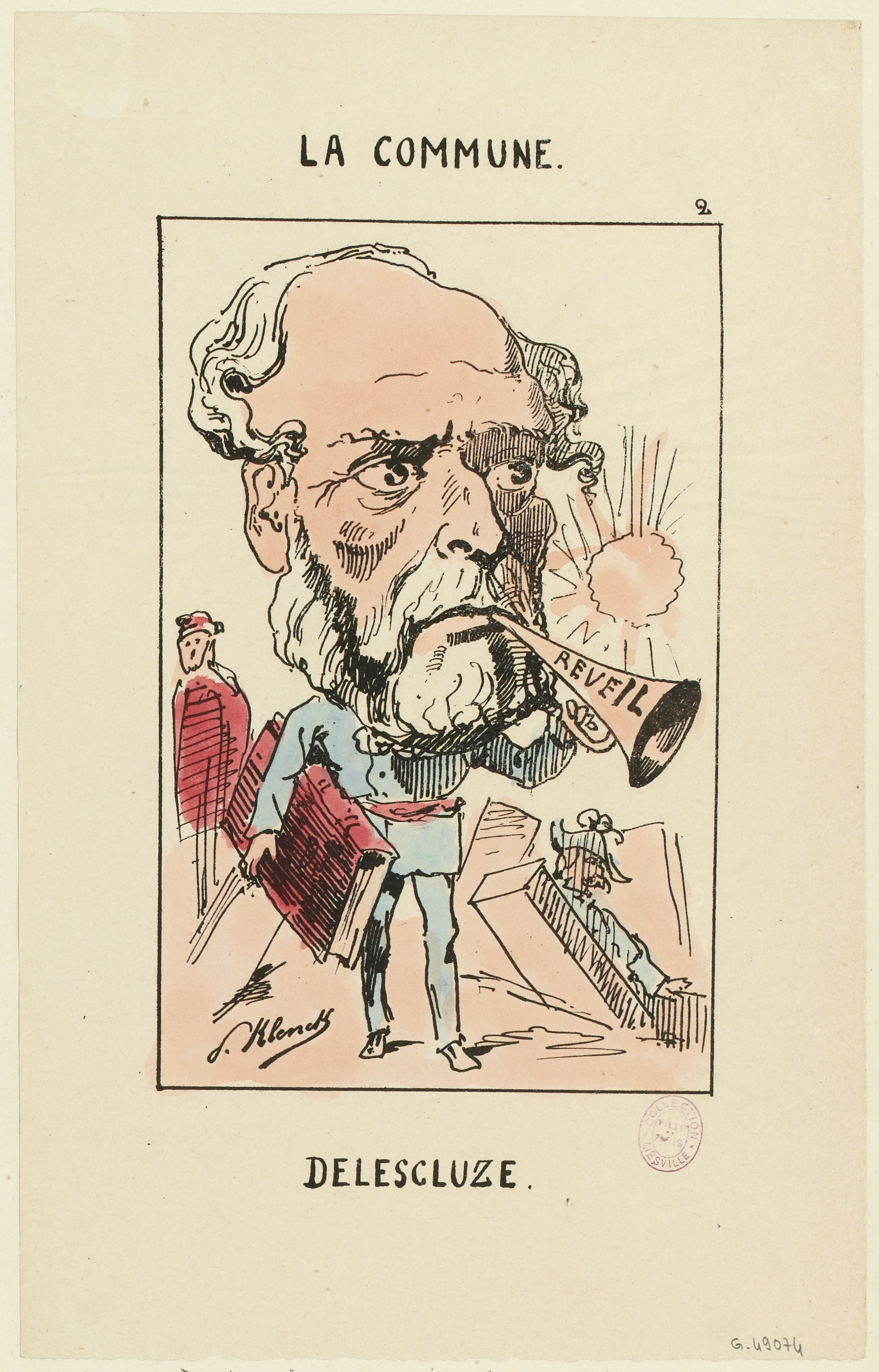
Caricature of Delescluze in La Commune series

Delescluze and the other Commune members had little time to organize their new administration; after the killing of Generals Lecomte and Clément-Thomas, the French national government, led by chief executive Adolphe Thiers, moved its headquarters to Versailles and began mobilizing the French army to recapture the city. The Commune organized its own military force, the National Guard, and established a Committee of Public Safety, modeled after the Committee of the same name in the French Revolution, to suppress opposition. Opposition newspapers were closed down and, beginning on 5 April, the Commune arrested the Archbishop of Paris and two hundred priests and other religious figures, proposing to trade them for Auguste Blanqui, a radical revolutionary leader held by the French government. Thiers refused.

A new siege of Paris, by the French army, began, under the eyes of the German army, which still occupied the heights to the north and east of the city. As the army approached, Delescluze and the Commune voted to destroy symbols of the old government; the Vendôme Column was pulled down on 16 May; the home of Adolphe Thiers was emptied of his art collection and demolished on 16 May.

On 21 May Delescluze and the Commune members were debating whether to punish the Commune military leader, Gustave Cluseret for incompetence or treason when news came that the French Army had entered Paris, through a section of the city defenses that had inadvertently been left unmanned. The next day, Delescluze issued a proclamation, calling upon all Parisians to join in the fight against the army. Delescluze did not have any experience as a soldier, but he knew how to write stirring prose. This was his proclamation, which was printed and posted all over the city on the 22nd:

TO THE PEOPLE OF PARIS: TO THE NATIONAL GUARD:

Citizens!

Enough of militarism, no more general staff with braid and gilding on their uniforms! Make way for the People, for fighters with bare arms! The hour of revolutionary war has sounded. The People don't know anything about clever maneuvers, but when they have a rifle in their hand, and pavement under their feet, they have nothing to fear from all the strategists of the royal military school.

To arms, citizens! To arms! It is a question, as you know, of conquering or falling into the merciless hands of the reactionaries and clerics of Versailles, of those miserable ones who have, by their actions, delivered France to the Prussians, and who want to make us pay the ransom for their treason!

If you desire that the generous amount of blood which has flowed like water for the last six weeks, shall not have been in vain; if you want to live in a France that is free and where all are equal; if you want to spare your children from your pain and misery; you will rise up like one man- and because of your formidable resistance, the enemy, who proudly imagines he will put you back into your yoke, will find himself shamed for his useless crimes by which he has been stained for the last two months.

Citizens, your representatives will fight and die with you if needed; but, in the name of this glorious France, the mother of all popular revolutions, permanent home of the ideas of justice and solidarity which must be and will be the laws of the world, march at the enemy, and let your revolutionary energy show him that traitors can try to sell Paris, but that no one can surrender it or conquer it.

The Commune is counting on you- count on the Commune!

Despite his bold words, the Commune was at a great disadvantage; the Commune forces were outnumbered by the army four or five to one; they had very few trained officers; and, most importantly, they had no plan for the defense of the city; Delescluze called upon each neighborhood to defend itself, which made it impossible for them to move or fight as a unified force.

The battle for Paris took place between 21 and 28 May 1871, which became known later as the "Bloody Week". By 22 May, the army had captured Montmartre and the western part of the city. On 23 May, Delescluze and the leaders of the Commune were located inside the Hôtel de Ville. They gave orders for the burning of the Tuileries Palace, the symbol of government authority, as well as the Palais de Justice, the Cour des Comptes, the Palais de la Légion d'Honneur, part of the Palais-Royal, and other government buildings and institutions.

On 24 May, as the army approached, Delescluze and the Commune leaders had to abandon the Hôtel de Ville. As soon as they left, the City Hall was set on fire, destroying the building and the city archives. The same day, on orders from the Committee of Public Safety, Archbishop Darboy and a dozen other hostages were executed. A group of Dominican priests was executed the following day. The fighting was bitter on both sides; Commune soldiers captured by the army were often shot without further formality.

==== Death and legacy ====
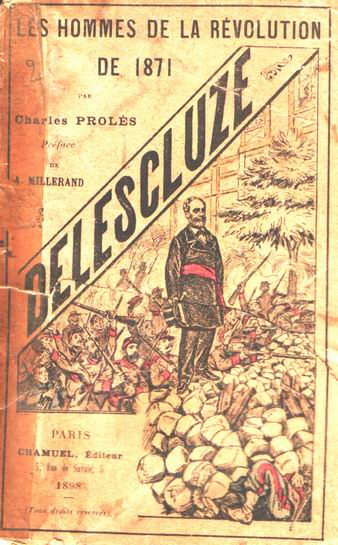
An illustration of the death of Delescluze

Delescluze and the remaining Communard leaders moved their headquarters to the city hall of the 11th arrondissement on rue Voltaire, but this neighborhood also was soon under attack by the army. At about 7:30 in the evening on the 25th, Delescluze put on his ceremonial sash as the chief executive of the Commune, and walked to the nearest defended Commune barricade, on Place Château-d'Eau. Unarmed, he climbed up to the top of the barricade, in clear view of the army soldiers, and was promptly shot dead.

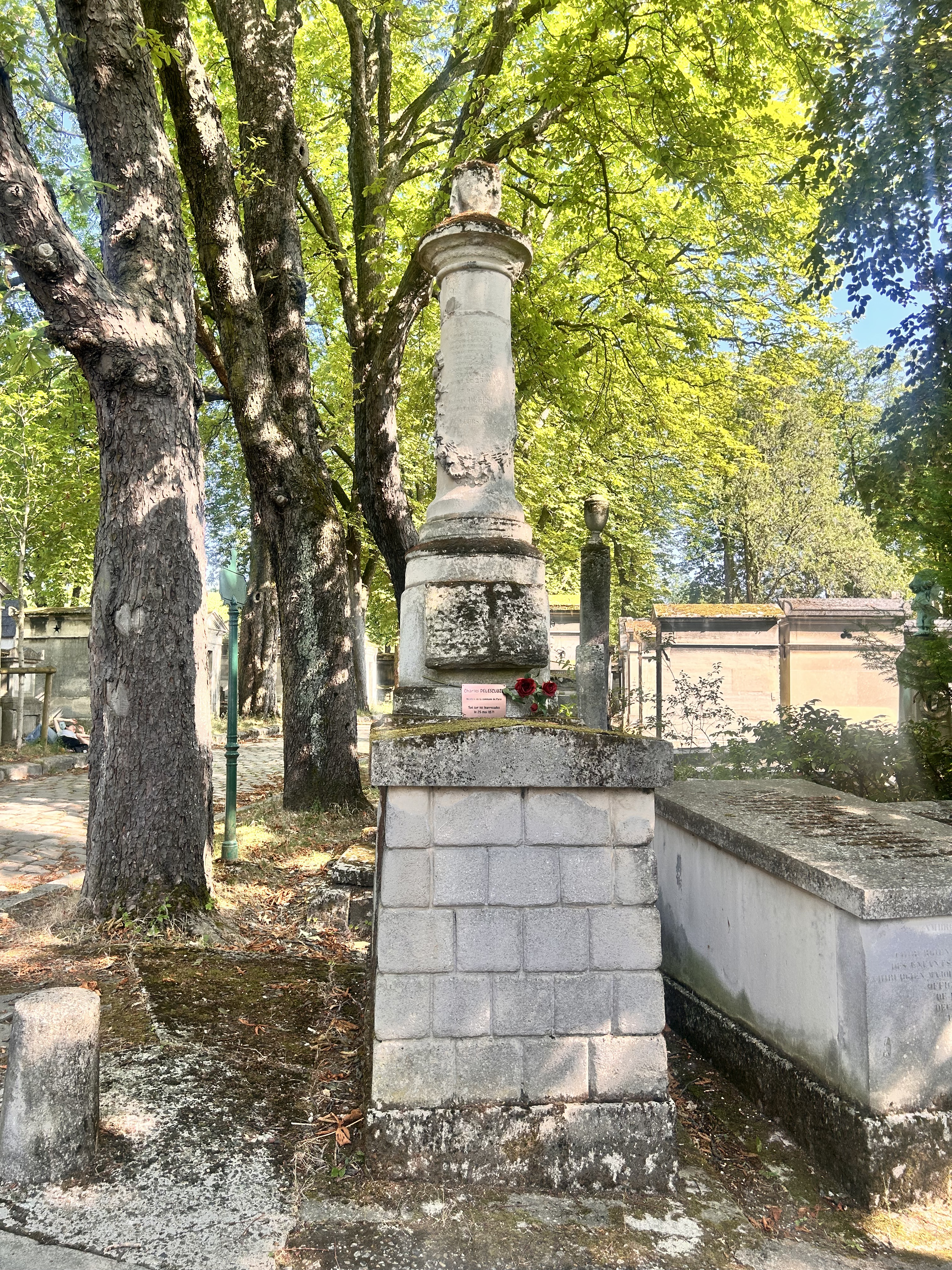
The grave of Delescluze in the 49th division of the Pére Lachaise Cemetery

After the death of Delescluze, the fighting continued on the 26th and 27th, when a bloody battle was fought at Père Lachaise cemetery. On 28 May, the last soldiers of the Commune surrendered and the fighting ended. Army casualties numbered 873 dead and 6,424 wounded. Commune casualties were never officially counted, but six to seven thousand Commune soldiers were buried in temporary graves and then reburied in city cemeteries, and another three thousand may have been buried in unmarked graves. 45,522 Commune prisoners were taken, most of whom were released. 3,417 were sentenced to deportation, 1,247 to life in prison, 3,359 to shorter terms, and 93 were condemned to death, of whom 23 were executed. There is no marked grave for Delescluze. Despite his absence and the reports that he had been killed, he was formally tried in his absence by a military tribunal and sentenced to death.

In 1930, the city council of Paris voted to name a street in 11th arrondissement rue Charles-Delescluze.
