= Adrien Lejeune =

French revolutionary (1847–1942)

- Lejeune in 1932
- Born: 3 June 1847; Bagnolet, Kingdom of France
- Died: 9 January 1942 (aged 94); Novosibirsk, USSR
- Burial place: Père Lachaise Cemetery
- Military career
- Allegiance: French Third Republic; Paris Commune
- Branch: National Guard
- Rank: Sergeant
- Units: 2nd Company; 28th Battalion
- Known for: Being the last surviving Communard from the Paris Commune
- Conflicts: Siege of Paris (1870–1871); Uprising of March 18, 1871; Bloody Week

Adrien Lejeune (French pronunciation: [adʁijɛ̃ ləʒœn]; 3 June 1847 – 9 January 1942) was a French revolutionary who is recognized as the last surviving Communard to have fought for the 1871 Paris Commune.

== Life ==
Adrien Félix Lejeune was born on 3 June 1847 in Bagnolet. Lejeune enlisted in the National Guard to fight against the Prussians during the Siege of Paris as part of the 2nd Company of the 28th Battalion. On 18 March 1871 he participated in the defense of the cannons of Montmartre on the side of the Communards against the French government at the onset of the Paris Commune. Over the next two months under the Paris Commune, Lejeune participated in skirmishes in Bagnolet and the 20th arrondissement, culminating with action during the Bloody Week in May 1871. On 28 May, the final day of the Paris Commune, Lejeune was arrested in Belleville. On 12 February 1872 he was sentenced to five years in prison, eventually reduced to four years.

After the Russian Revolution of 1917, the Paris Commune was idolized by the Soviet government. Following a request from the French Communist Party, which Lejeune had joined in 1922, he was invited in 1928 to emigrate to the Soviet Union, where he moved in 1930. By the time of his death in Novosibirsk in 1942, Lejeune was recognized as the last surviving Communard at 94 years' old. Originally buried in the Soviet Union, his ashes were repatriated on the initiative of the French Communist Party and buried in Père Lachaise Cemetery, Paris, on 23 May 1971, as part of the centenary celebrations of the Paris Commune.
