= Louis-Léon Cugnot =

French sculptor (1835–1894)

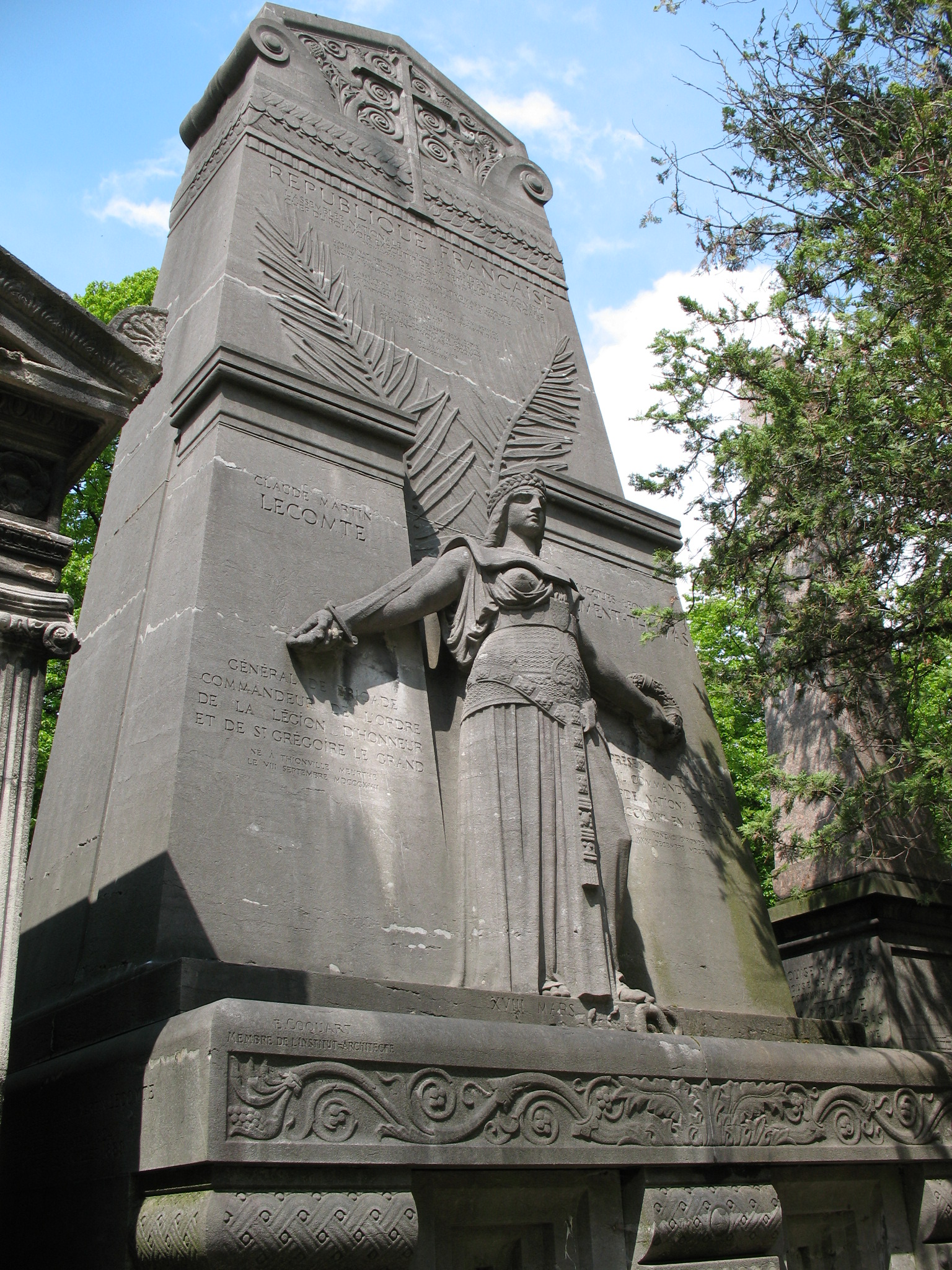
Monument to Jacques Léon Clément-Thomas and Claude Lacombe, Père Lachaise Cemetery, Paris

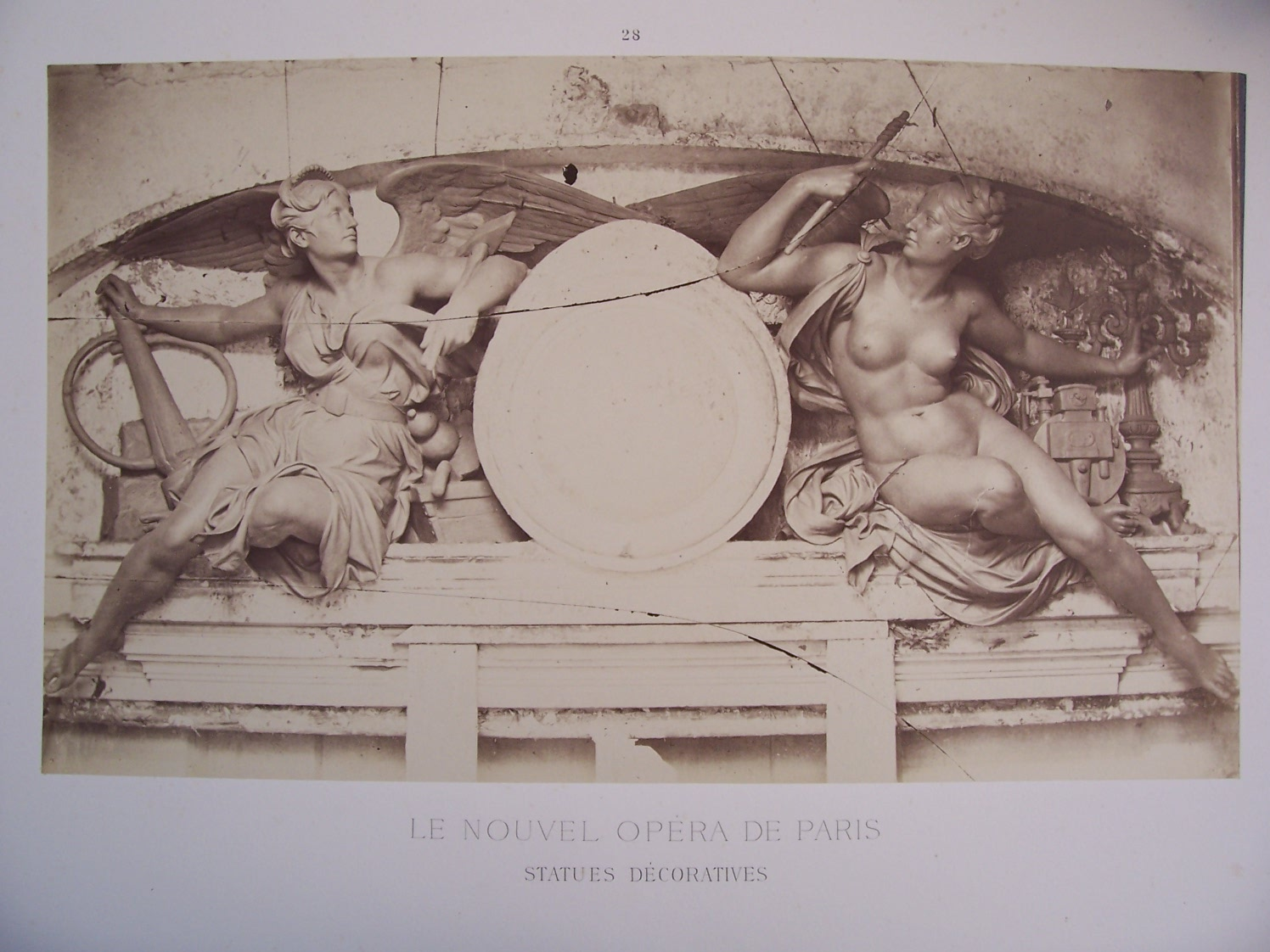
Allegorical figures of Paving and Gas, foyer of the Palais Garnier, Paris

Louis-Léon Cugnot (English: /kuːˈnjoʊ/ koo-NYOH, French: [lwi leɔ̃ kyɲo]; Paris 17 October 1835 – 19 August 1894) was a French sculptor.

== Life ==
Cugnot was born in Paris, son of the sculptor Etienne Cugnot. He entered the École nationale supérieure des Beaux-Arts in the 1850s under teachers Francisque Joseph Duret and Georges Diebolt. Cugnot took the Prix de Rome in 1859 along with co-winner Alexandre Falguière, and was a pensioner of the Villa Medici in Rome from 1860 to 1863.

In 1874 he was made a Knight of the Legion of Honor.

== Work ==
Cugnot's work includes:

- Drunken Faun, bronze, in the gardens of the Museum of Fine Arts of Lyon, 1863
- marble figure of Petrarch, at the Hôtel de la Païva, Paris, circa 1863
- Napoleon seated on an eagle dominating the world, plaster, at the Musée d'Orsay, 1869
- the 1871 tomb of Generals Jacques Léon Clément-Thomas and Claude Lecomte, two of the first casualties of the Paris Commune, in the 4th division of Père Lachaise Cemetery in Paris, with architect Ernest Coquart
- Monument to the Battle of Callao, with a finial figure of Nike, historical and allegorical bronzes, and friezes of the battle, for Plaza Dos de Mayo, Lima, Peru, circa 1873
- interior allegorical figures of Paving and Gas for the Palais Garnier, Paris, circa 1874
- pediment figures of Justice and Strength in the Court of Cassation, Paris, circa 1879
- Young Jupiter, a cast bronze copy dated 1886, at the Seventh Regiment Armory, Upper East Side, New York City
- two bronze medallions for the grave of Pierre-Alexandre Lafabrègue and his wife, Père Lachaise Cemetery
- four monumental vases representing the four seasons, in the gardens of the Bourges Cathedral
