= Cugnot =

Cugnot (English: /kuːˈnjoʊ/, French: [kyɲo]) is a French surname. Notable people with the surname include:

- Jean Cugnot (1899–1933), French cyclist
- Louis-Léon Cugnot (1835–1894), French sculptor
- Nicolas-Joseph Cugnot (1725–1804), French inventor
