= Jacques Leon Clément-Thomas =

French army general and parliamentary deputy

Jacques Léon Clément-Thomas
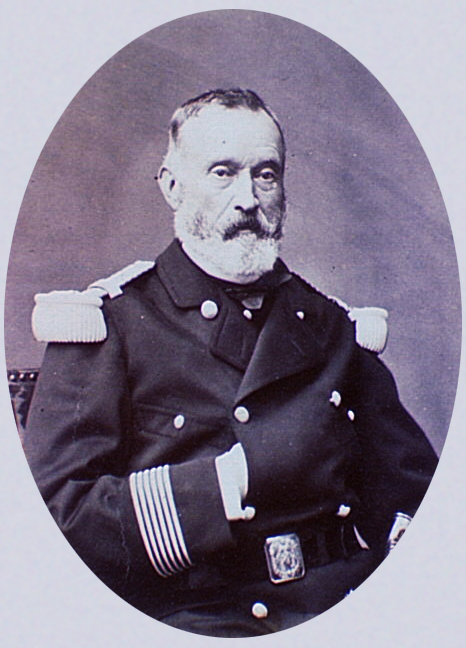
- Born: 31 December 1809; France, Libourne
- Died: 18 March 1871 (aged 61) France, Montmartre
- Rank: General
- Conflicts: Paris Commune; Paris uprising (1871) †

Jacques Léon Clément-Thomas was born in 1809 in Libourne (Gironde) and shot in Paris on 18 March 1871, one of the first deaths of the Paris Commune. A Republican of the old guard, Clément-Thomas was an army general, Commander in Chief of France's National Guard on two occasions, and a parliamentary deputy.

== Early military and political career ==
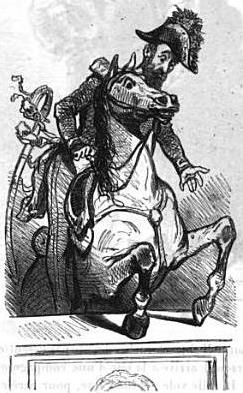
Clément-Thomas caricatured by Amédée de Noé in 1851.

Jacques Léon Clément-Thomas joined the army as a volunteer at the age of twenty. As a junior officer of republican tendencies, he was implicated in several plots (including that of Lunéville) during the July Monarchy. Arrested in 1835, Clément-Thomas managed to escape from the Sainte-Pélagie Prison in Paris.

Exiled to England, Clément-Thomas returned to France after the amnesty of political offenders in 1837 and collaborated with the newspaper Le National, the organ of the "bourgeois Republican" majority. Clément-Thomas was a supporter of the French Second Republic and was elected to the Constituent Assembly in 1848 as member for Gironde. When the uprising of June 1848 broke out, he was placed in command of the National Guard of the Seine, which harshly repressed the revolting workers of the National Ateliers. Clément-Thomas failed to be elected a deputy of the Legislative Assembly in 1849.

He opposed Napoleon III's coup d'état of December 2, 1851 and vainly tried to raise the Gironde against the coup. During the Second French Empire, he went into exile in Belgium and Luxembourg.

== Return to the National Guard ==
Clément-Thomas returned to Paris after the proclamation of the Republic on 4 September 1870. The Government of National Defence appointed him commander in chief of the National Guard of the Seine during the siege of Paris. He participated in the disastrous Buzenval breakout attempt of 20 January 1871. Clément-Thomas resigned his command on 13 February.

== Execution ==
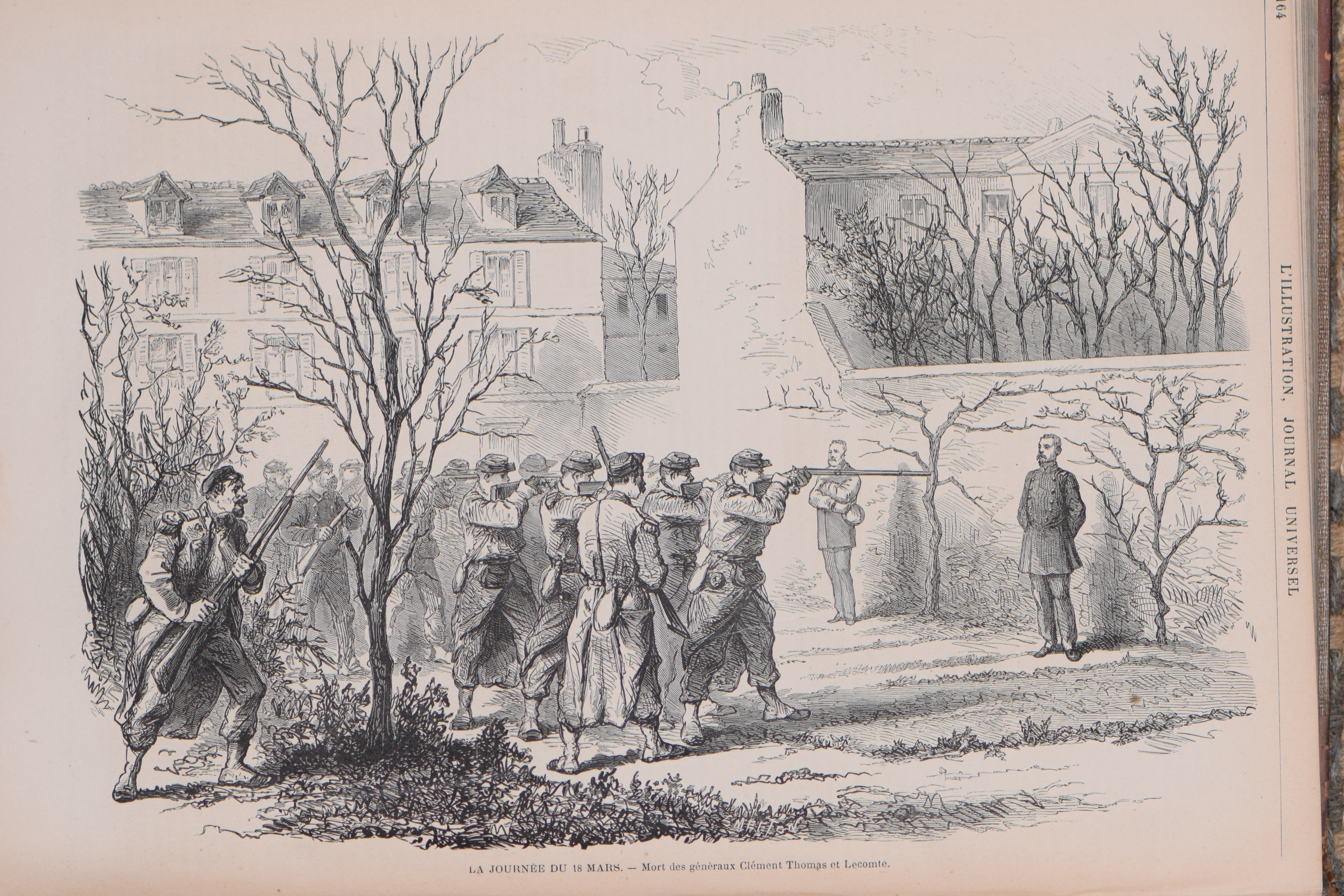
The execution of General Jacques Léon Clément-Thomas

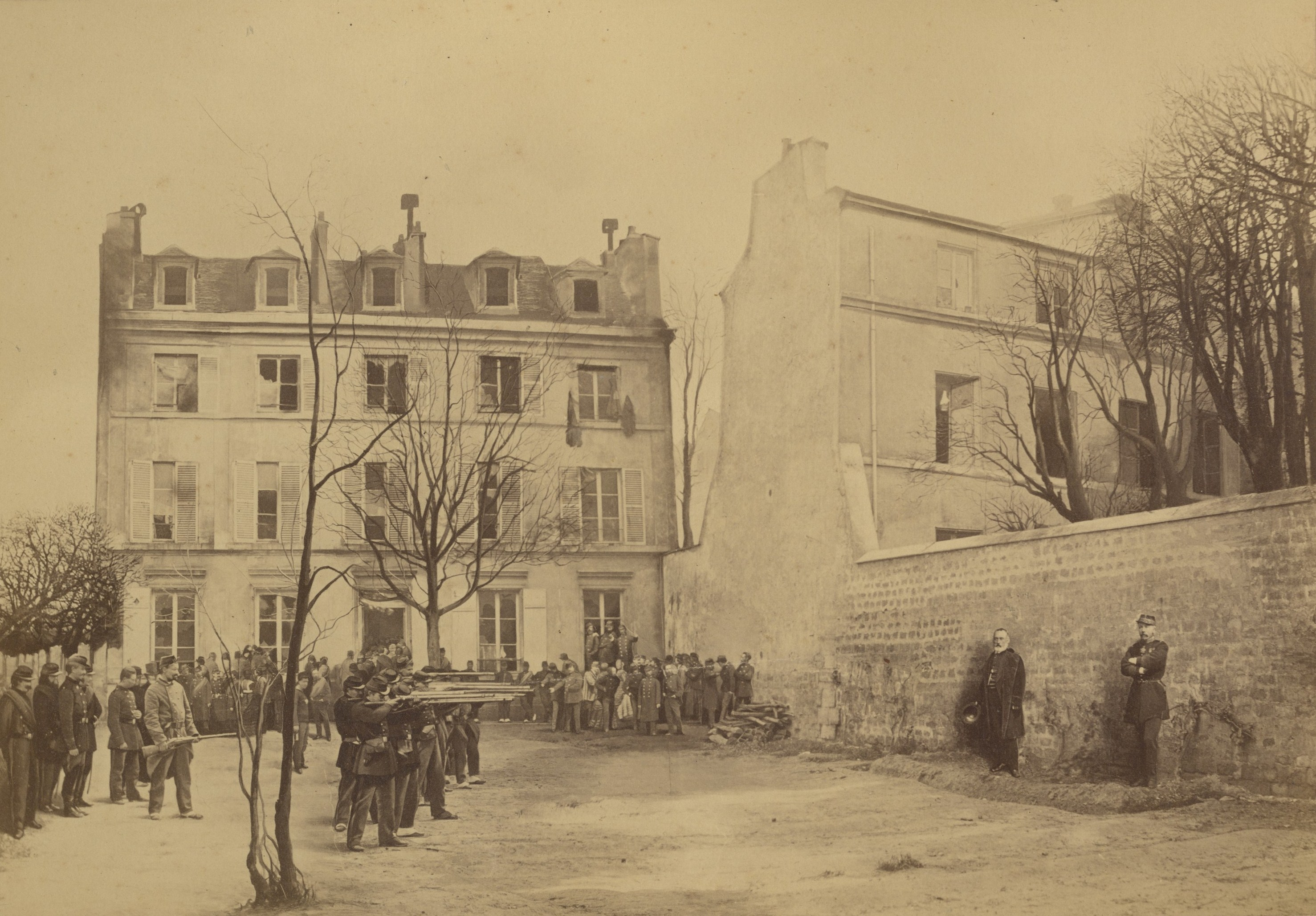
The Killing of Generals Clément-Thomas and Lecomte, 6 rue des Rosiers, Montmartre - Photomontage by Eugène Appert. Bibliothèque historique de la Ville de Paris.

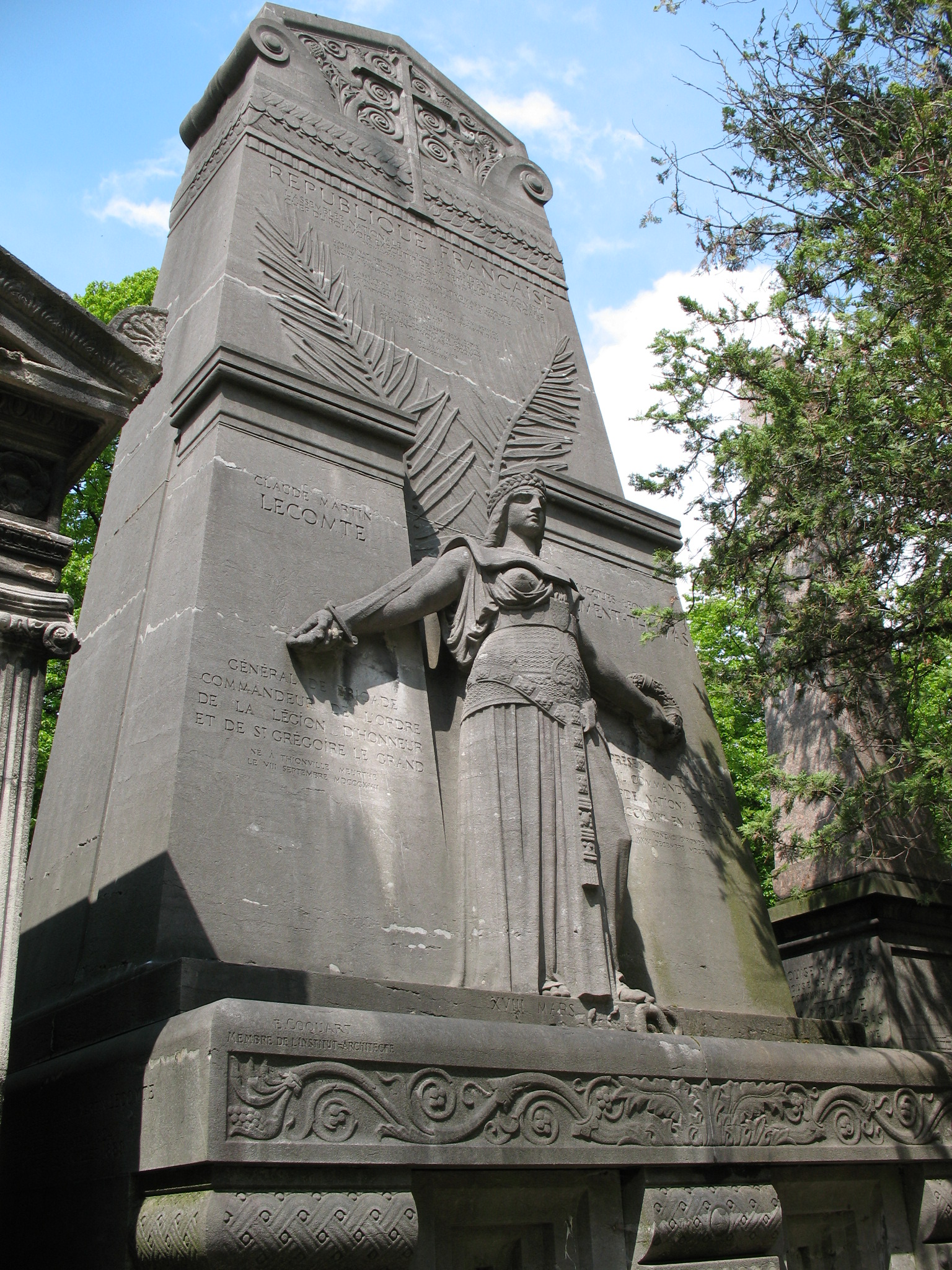
Monument at Père-Lachaise cemetery.

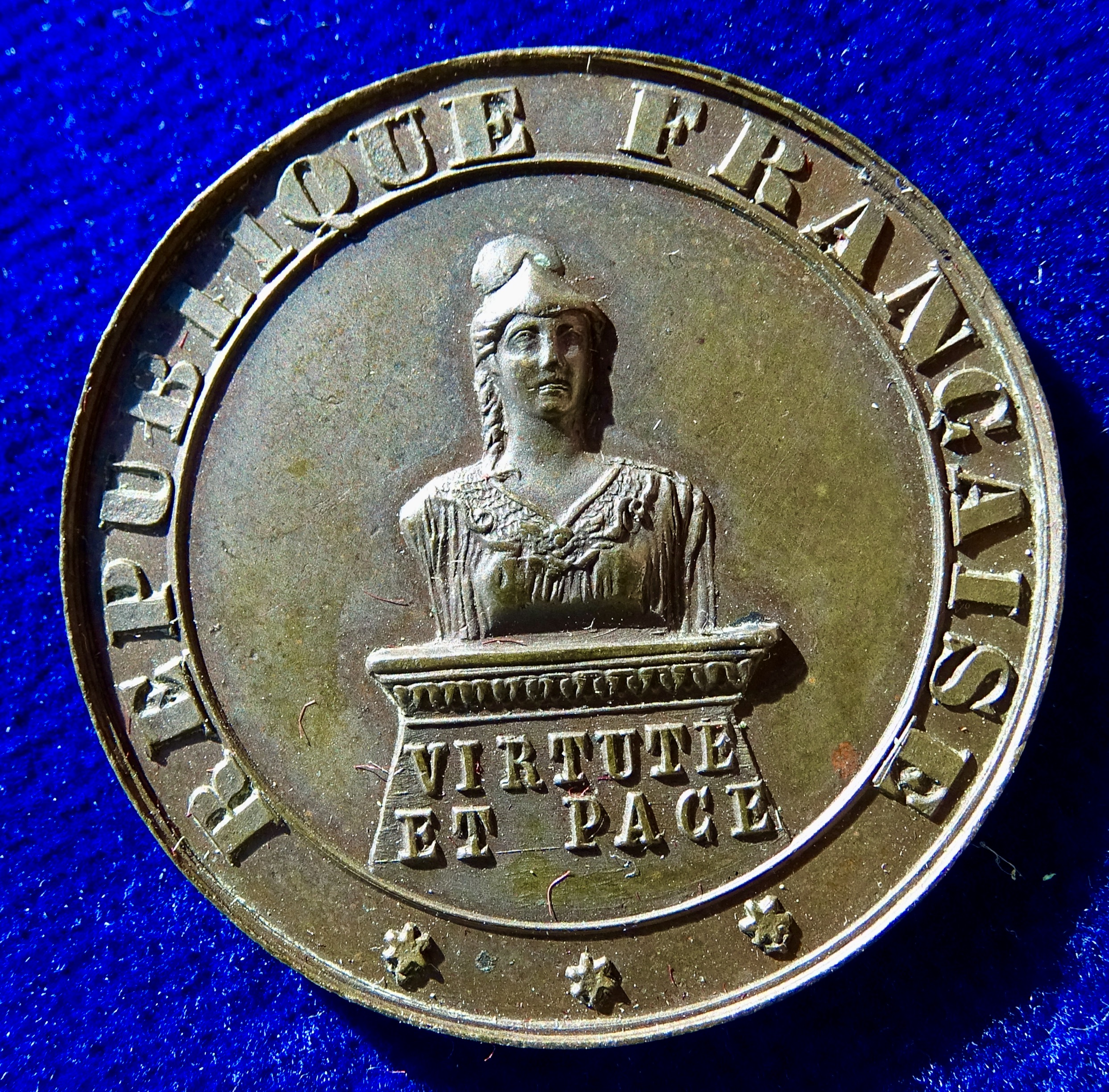
1871 medal commemorating the death penalty for the murder of the French Generals Lecomte and Thomas, obverse

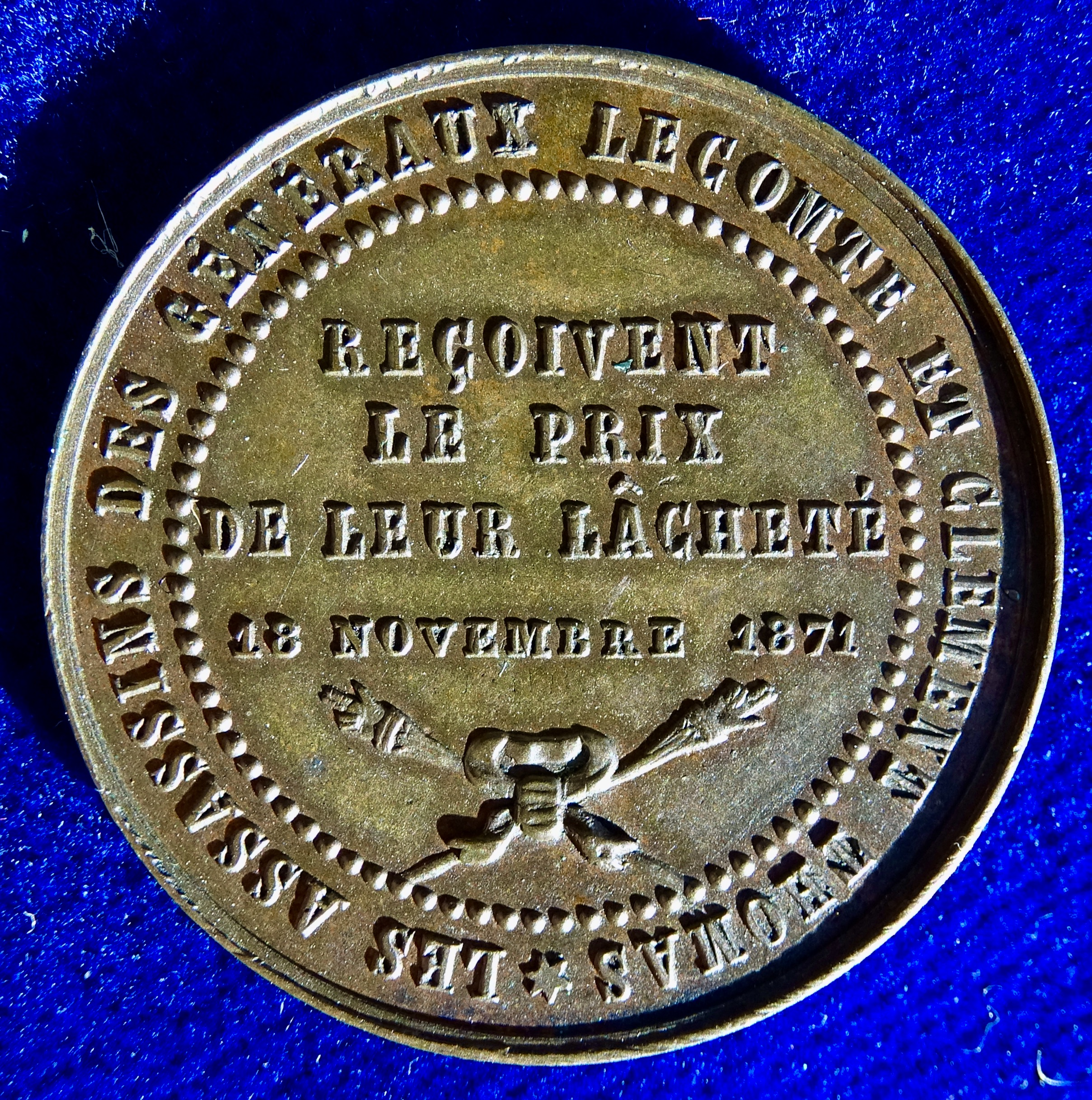
The reverse of this medal

During the uprising of 18 March 1871, in civilian clothes, Clément-Thomas reconnoitered the barricades of Montmartre. He was recognized and seized by the crowd, thrown on top of the corpse of General Claude Lecomte, who had been lynched a few minutes earlier, and he too was executed. Their bodies remained exposed for two days on rue des Rosiers (now rue du Chevalier-de-la-Barre).

A Doctor Guyon, who examined the bodies afterwards, found forty balls in the body of Clément-Thomas and nine rounds in the back of Lecomte.

The legend that Generals Lecomte and Thomas were shot "in a regulation manner" by a firing squad was a fabrication: it is based on a photograph staged by the photographer Eugène Appert, which was taken in June, three months later. This photograph may have in turn been inspired by an engraving and report in the edition of L'Illustration of the 25th of March, 1871. There was even a 1908 activist theater production (entitled La Commune), which portrays a pseudo-trial of the two generals before their execution.

== Legacy ==
On 18 November 1871 a court-martial (le 6e Conseil de Guerre) handed down the death penalty to Simon Charles Mayer (1820 Nancy - 1887 Basel), major of the Paris Commune, for being responsible for the murder of the two generals Claude Lecomte, and Jacques Leonard Clement Thomas, in spite of weak evidence. In 1872 this sentence was commuted to life-long forced labour, and thereafter he was exiled to New Caledonia.

== See also ==
- June Days Uprising
- Paris Commune
- Claude Lecomte
- Eugène Appert

== Other Sources ==
- Bernard Noël, Dictionnaire de la Commune [Dictionary of the Commune], Flammarion, collection Champs, 1978.
- Récit de l'exécution des Généraux Lecomte et Clément-Thomas par Alphonse Daudet dans Le jardin de la rue des rosiers - Souvenirs d'un homme de lettres [Account of the execution of Generals Lecomte and Clément-Thomas by Alphonse Daudet in The Garden on the Rue des Rosiers - Memories of a man of letters.]
