= National Workshops =

1848 publicly-funded jobs in France

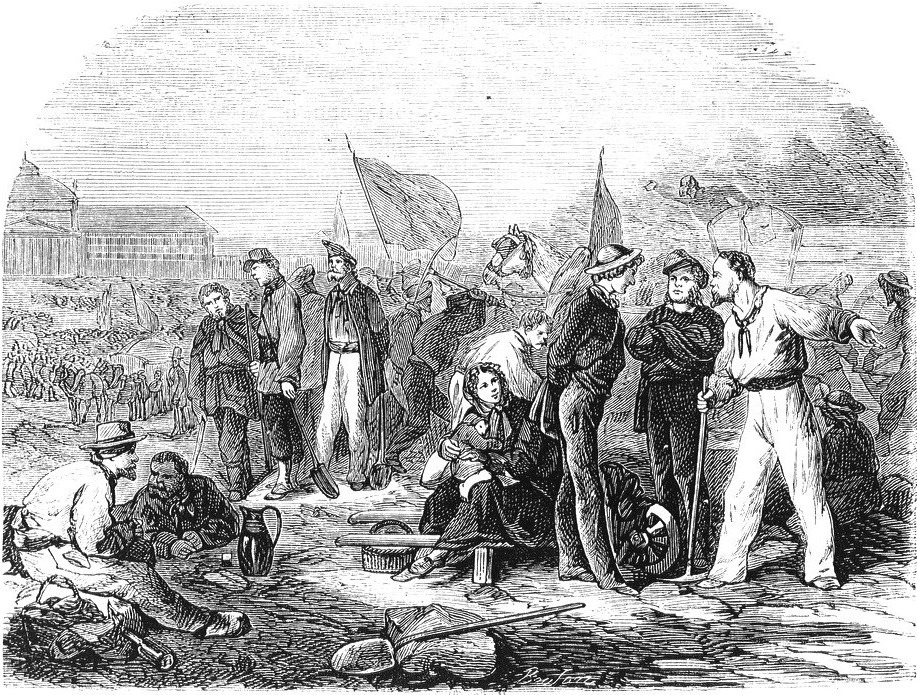
Les Ateliers nationaux au Champ-de-Mars

National Workshops (French: Ateliers Nationaux) refer to areas of work provided for the unemployed by the French Second Republic after the Revolution of 1848. The political crisis which resulted in the abdication of Louis Philippe caused an industrial crisis adding to the general agricultural and commercial distress which had prevailed throughout 1847. It rendered the problem of unemployment in Paris acute.

On February 25, 1848 a group of armed workers interrupted a session of the provisional government to demand "the organization of labor" and "the right to work". The provisional government under the influence of one of its members, Louis Blanc, passed a decree (25 February 1848) guaranteeing government-funded jobs. The following is an extract: "The provisional government of the French Republic undertakes to guarantee the existence of the workmen by work. It undertakes to guarantee work for every citizen."

For the carrying out of this decree, Blanc wanted the formation of a ministry of labor, but this was shelved by his colleagues, who as a compromise appointed a government labor Commission, under the presidency of Blanc, with power of inquiry and consultation only. The implementation of the February decree was entrusted to the minister of public works, M. Marie, and various public works were immediately started. The initial stages of the national works prompted the following account:

The workman first of all obtained a certificate from the landlord of his house, or furnished apartments, showing his address, whether in Paris or the department of the Seine. This certificate was visaed and stamped by the police commissary of the district. The workman then reported to the office of the maire of his ward, and, on delivering this document, received in exchange a note of admission to the national works, bearing his name, residence and calling, and enabling him to be received by the director of the workplaces in which vacancies existed. All went well while the number of the unemployed was less than 6000, but as soon as that number was exceeded, the workmen of each arrondissement, after having visited all the open works in succession without result, returned to their mayor’s offices tired, starving and discontented.

In June 1848, the Workshops were closed down, leading to the June Days uprising.
