= Uprising of March 18, 1871 =

French revolt

Paris uprising of 18 March 1871
- Part of the Paris Commune
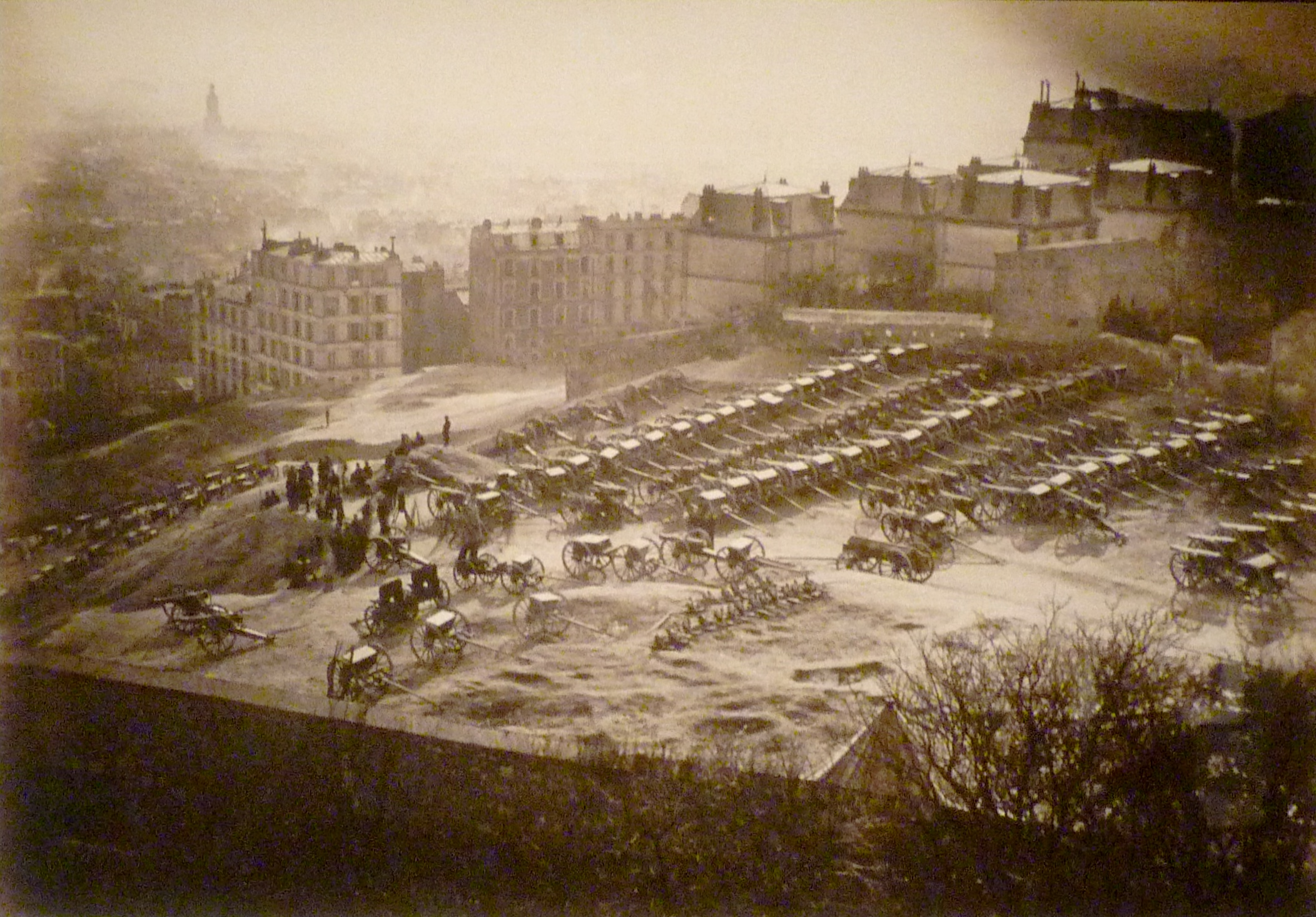
- National Guard cannons on the Montmartre heights, March 1871
Date	18 March 1871
Location	Paris, France
Result	Revolutionary victory • Establishment of the Paris Commune • Flight of the national government to Versailles

Belligerents
(France) French Republic (Thiers government); Regular army	Parisian insurgents Federated National Guard

Commanders and leaders
Adolphe Thiers; Joseph Vinoy; Claude Lecomte †; Jacques Léon Clément-Thomas †	Central Committee of the National Guard

Strength
~25,000 troops (planned)	Several thousand federated guardsmen and civilians

Casualties and losses
2 generals executed	Unknown (light)

The Paris uprising of 18 March 1871 was an insurrection involving elements of the National Guard and sections of the Parisian population, triggered by the attempt of the government led by Adolphe Thiers to reclaim artillery pieces that had been financed by public subscription during the Prussian siege of Paris. The uprising marked the beginning of the Paris Commune, the most significant of the insurrectionary communes that emerged in France in 1870–1871. The Commune came to an end during the suppression known as the Bloody Week from 21 May to 28 May 1871.

The operation to seize the artillery began before dawn. However, many regular army units encountered resistance from local residents and, in several instances, soldiers refused orders and fraternized with the crowd. General Claude Lecomte was arrested and later executed at Montmartre, together with General Jacques Léon Clément-Thomas, who had been apprehended while dressed in civilian clothing. At the same time, the Federated National Guard (Fédérés) occupied key strategic points across the city.

Historians have variously interpreted the failure of the operation, attributing it to poor planning, hesitation, or deliberate delay, and have often cited it as evidence of Thiers’s limited capacity to reassert control over Paris. The government and the forces that remained loyal to it subsequently withdrew to Versailles, leaving the capital in the hands of the insurgents. The Central Committee of the National Guard assumed authority at the Hôtel de Ville and took charge of the city’s municipal administration.

== Background ==
To shut up in Paris a hundred thousand undisciplined men demoralised by their defeats, in these days of famine that will precede the arrival of supplies – is this not to shut up rebellion, riot, pillage?

— Edmond de Goncourt, Journal, 30 January 1871

=== Siege and capitulation of Paris ===
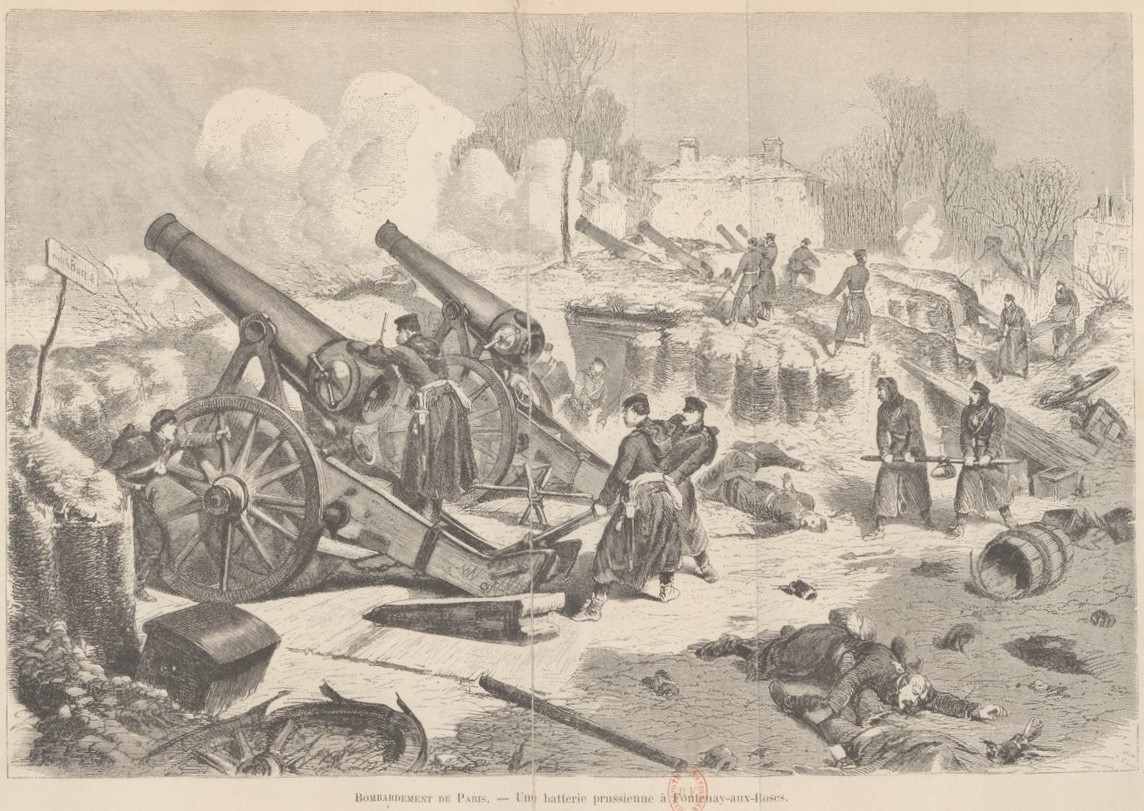
Prussian artillery bombarding Paris during the siege

On 19 July 1870, France declared the Franco-Prussian War. From early August, French armies suffered a series of defeats. After the capitulation of Napoleon III at Sedan, Parisian deputies proclaimed the Republic on 4 September 1870, but the war continued and Paris was besieged from 19 September 1870. The Government of National Defense failed to reverse the military situation and signed an armistice on 28 January 1871.

Stunned, the Parisian population – having endured the hardships of the siege, winter cold, and Prussian bombardment – was overcome with resentment. The National Assembly, elected on 8 February 1871 and dominated by monarchists and conservatives, deepened Parisian bitterness. Many felt abandoned or betrayed by rural France, which, in the words of historian Michel Cordillot, “thought only of peace and had no regard for the sacrifices they had made”. Of the 43 Paris seats, voters elected 36 republicans, but they could not prevent the Assembly from ratifying the preliminary peace treaty on 26 February. The armistice’s provision for partial Prussian occupation of the city further enraged Parisians, who had never been militarily conquered.

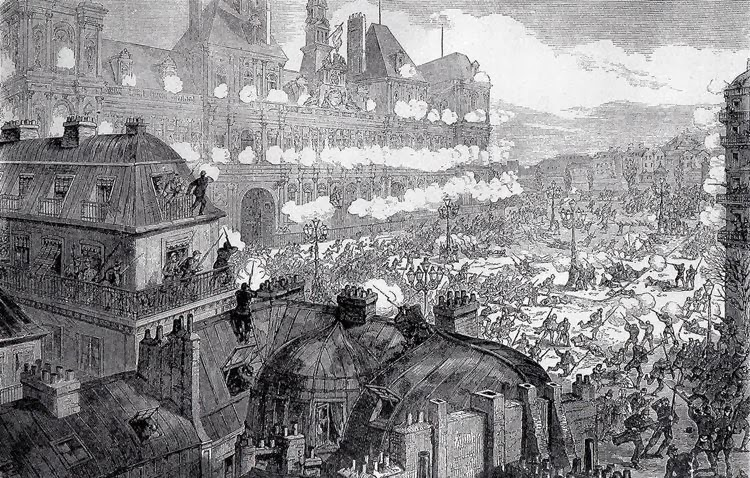
The failed uprising of 22 January 1871 outside the Hôtel de Ville

During the siege, elements of the National Guard had already shown discontent with the conduct of operations and distrust of the government, notably during the failed uprisings of 31 October 1870 and 22 January 1871. On 15 February, General Clément-Thomas, exasperated by the indiscipline of his men, resigned his command, while the National Guard Federation gradually took shape. On 24 February, to mark the anniversary of the Revolution of 1848, about one hundred armed battalions paraded around the July Column to demonstrate their attachment to the Republic. Government authority was increasingly challenged, and regular troops were withdrawn from working-class districts.

=== The Assembly against Paris ===
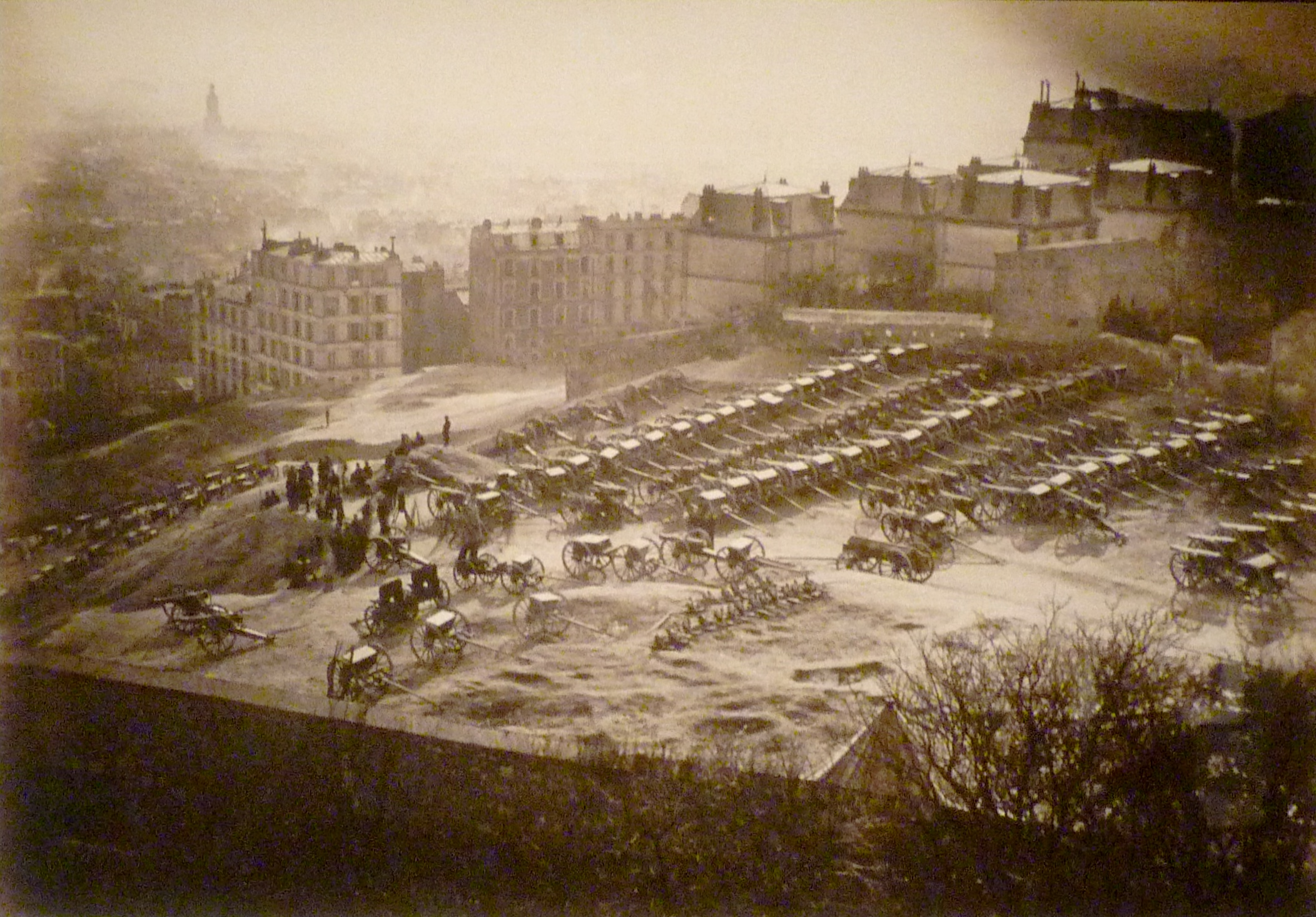
National Guard cannons on the Montmartre hill

On 1 March, in accordance with the armistice, Prussian troops entered Paris; confrontation was narrowly avoided by establishing a cordon around the wealthy districts. The National Guard emptied arsenals and concentrated its cannons on the heights of Montmartre, Belleville, and the Place des Vosges.

The appointment of General Louis d'Aurelle de Paladines on 6 March was seen as provocation. On 10 March, the Assembly passed measures perceived as humiliations: ending pay for most National Guards (restricted to those proving destitution) and demanding immediate settlement of commercial debts, threatening thousands of traders and artisans with bankruptcy. The Assembly also chose to sit at Versailles, thereby, in Jacques Rougerie’s phrase, “decapitating Paris in favour of the city of kings”. These measures radicalised even moderate elements while the National Guard Federation organised itself.

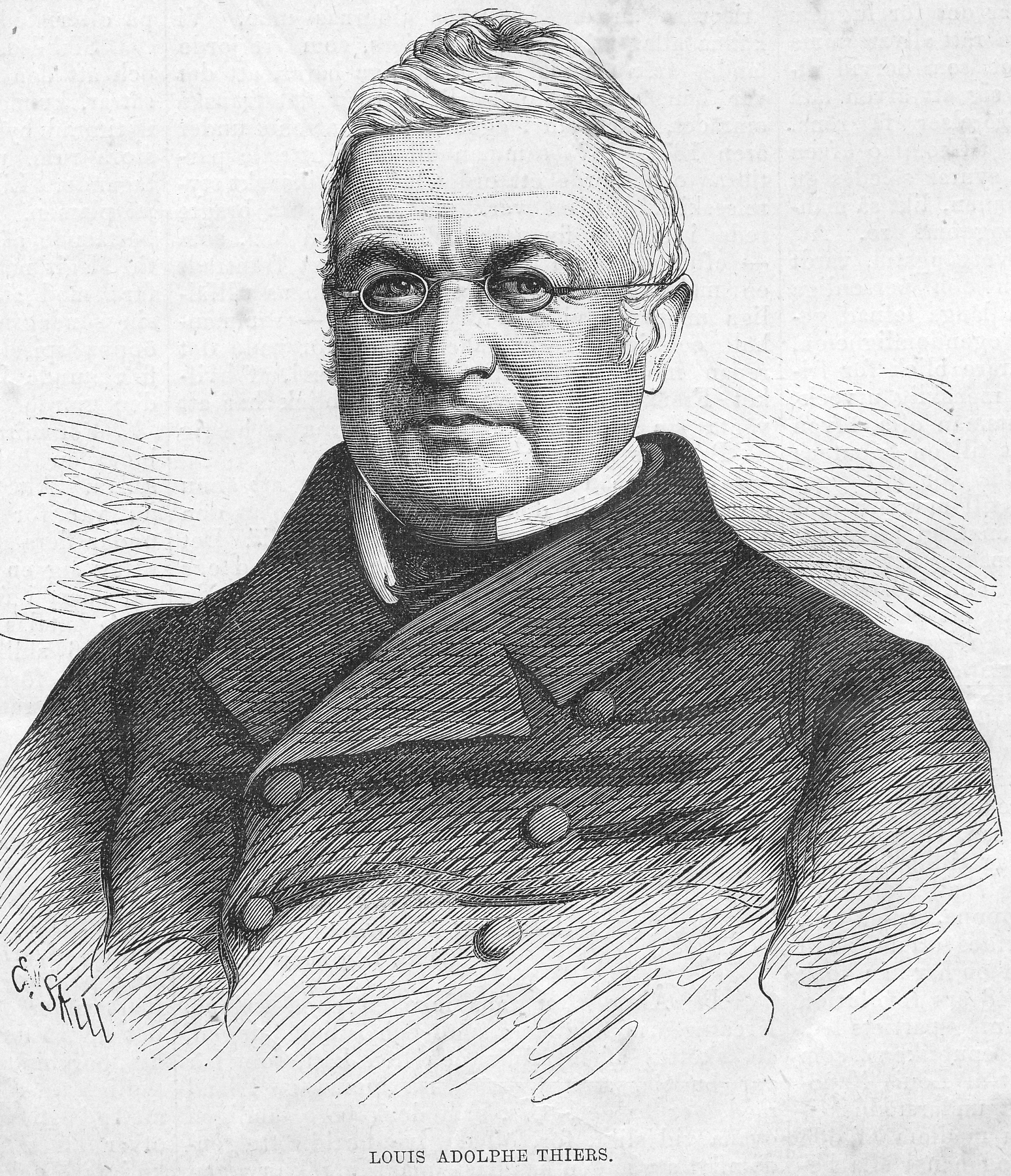
Adolphe Thiers, head of the executive power since 17 February 1871

From Versailles, the government perceived Parisian anger. General Joseph Vinoy, military governor of Paris, multiplied repressive measures (banning meetings, suspending republican newspapers) to no avail. Mayor Georges Clemenceau of the 18th arrondissement attempted mediation, but the 10 March announcements ended negotiations. Thiers arrived in Paris on 13 March to reassert control. By 15 March, 215 of 242 National Guard battalions had joined the Federation, which adopted its statutes and elected a Central Committee.

== Events ==
=== Preparations ===
Thiers was determined to restore order before the National Assembly convened at Versailles on 20 March. Several northern and eastern districts were already in open rebellion after regular troops withdrew. The government planned to seize the National Guard cannons and arrest the movement’s leaders while posting placards calling for support.

About 15,000–25,000 troops were mobilised. General Susbielle’s division was to take the Montmartre cannons; General Faron’s was to secure Buttes-Chaumont and Belleville; General Maud’huy was to hold the Bastille and isolate the Left Bank.

=== Morning ===
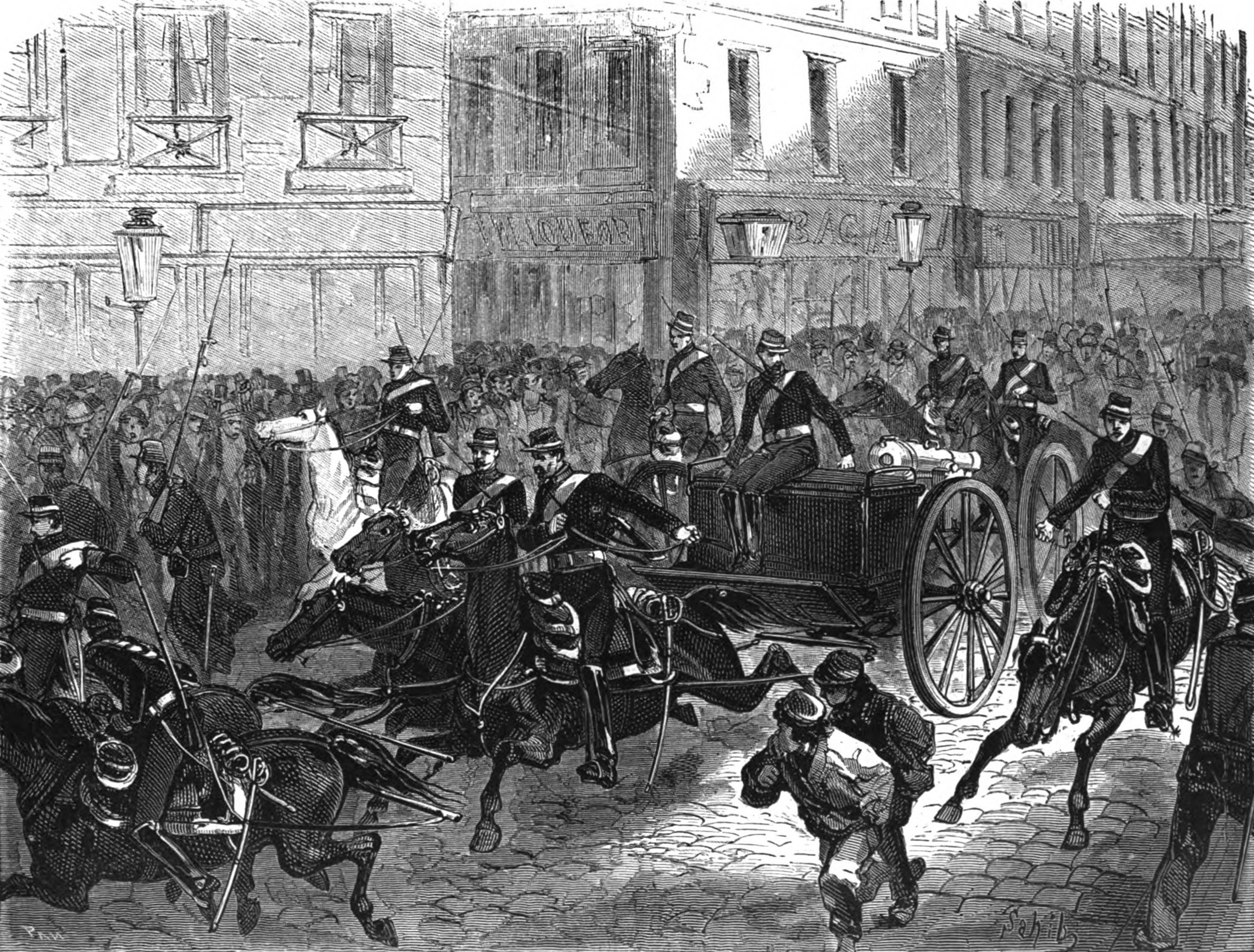
Troops sent by Thiers seizing cannons on Montmartre

On 18 March, from 3 a.m., troops reached their objectives by 6 a.m., but horses and harnesses were late, delaying removal of the cannons. At Montmartre, guard Germain Turpin was gravely wounded, and the National Guard post in the Rue des Rosiers came under fire. As residents awoke – many of them women – crowds gathered around the cannon parks and hemmed in the soldiers. Inhabitants cut the horses’ traces to prevent the guns being moved.

General Lecomte ordered his men to fire, but soldiers of the 88th March Regiment refused, lowered their rifle butts to the ground (crosse en l’air), and fraternized. The Montmartre Vigilance Committee sounded the alarm; six battalions erected fortifications. Lecomte was arrested and taken to the Château-Rouge.

Similar scenes occurred elsewhere. Barricades rose in the 11th arrondissement and Faubourg Saint-Antoine. The government failed to rally loyal National Guard battalions from bourgeois districts. By noon the Fédérés held the Place de la Bastille; regular troops withdrew.

=== Afternoon ===
==== Victory of the Fédérés and government flight ====
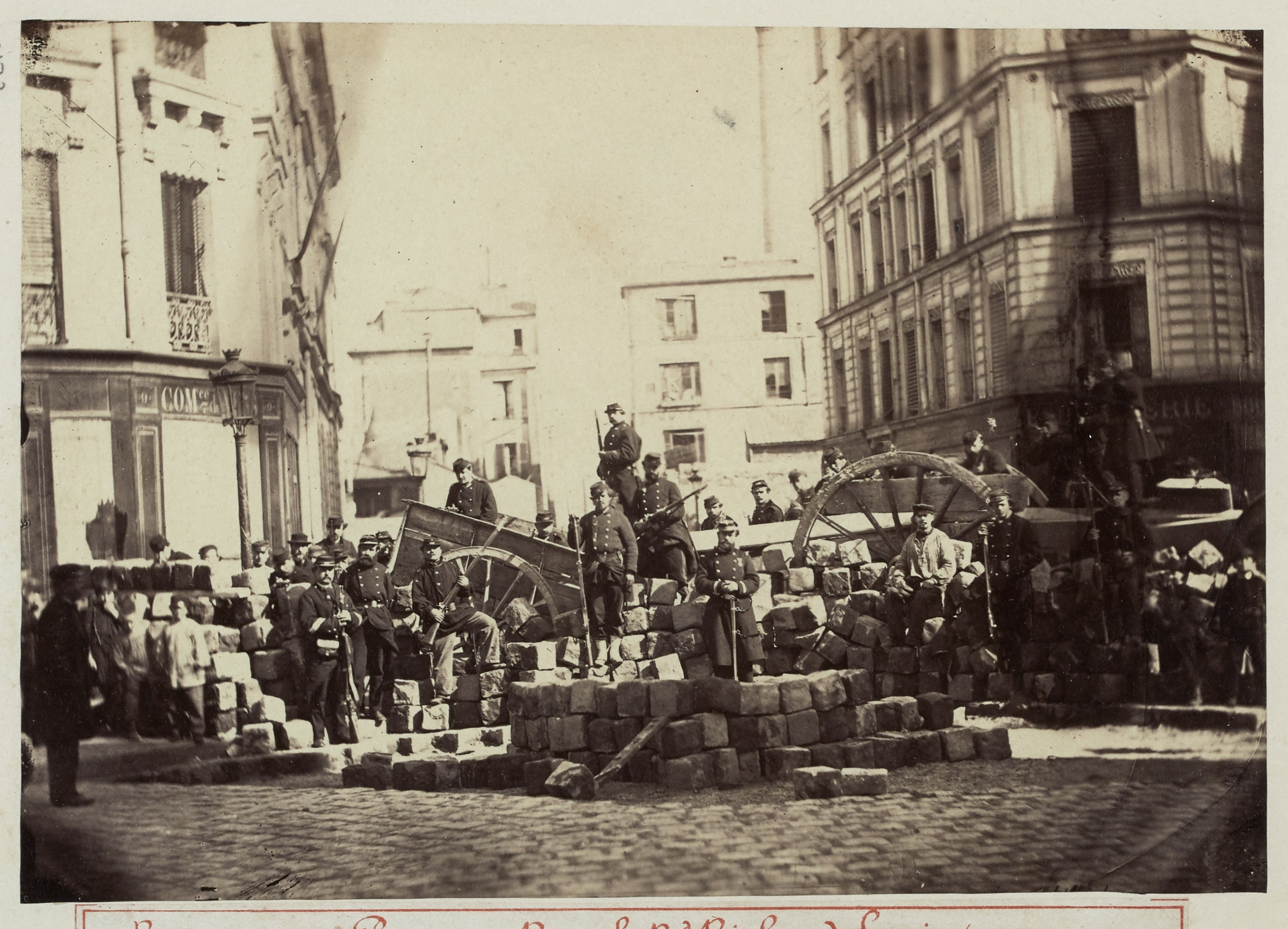
Barricade on Boulevard Richard-Lenoir, 18 March 1871

On the Left Bank, Blanquist Émile-Victor Duval seized the Latin Quarter and the Panthéon powder magazine. Regular troops evacuated the entire Left Bank to avoid further fraternization.

On the Right Bank, the Fédérés took key buildings. Panic gripped the Ministry of Foreign Affairs at the Quai d’Orsay. At 4 p.m., on the advice of generals Vinoy and Le Flô, Thiers ordered evacuation to Versailles.

In the evening, columns converged on the Hôtel de Ville, which was occupied shortly before midnight. The Central Committee installed itself there.

==== Execution of Generals Lecomte and Clément-Thomas ====
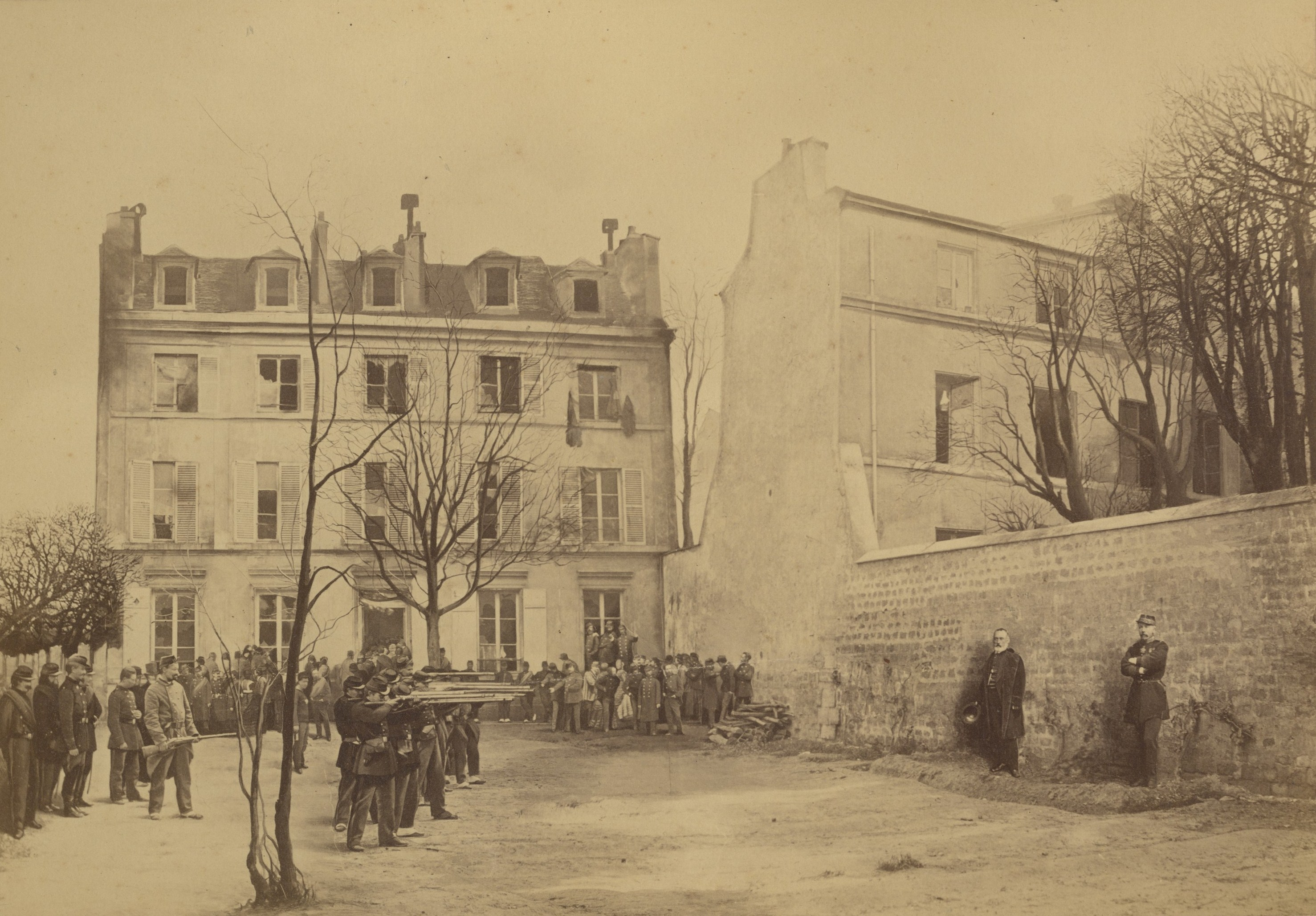
Photomontage by Ernest-Charles Appert showing the execution of Generals Lecomte and Clément-Thomas

In the afternoon, General Lecomte was transferred to 6 Rue des Rosiers. A hostile crowd gathered but was momentarily calmed. Then General Clément-Thomas, recognised in civilian clothes, was brought in. Despite interventions (including by Mayor Clemenceau), both men were summarily executed by an enraged crowd.

== Aftermath ==
=== Establishment of the Paris Commune ===
After 18 March, the Fédérés controlled most of Paris and the main seats of power, including six mairies (5th, 13th, 14th, 15th, 19th, and 20th arrondissements). The Central Committee, considering its mandate limited to the National Guard, called municipal elections (first scheduled for 22 March, then held on 26 March). It appointed members to head administrative services and adopted urgent measures: lifting the state of siege, freeing political prisoners, restoring press freedom, suspending pawnshop sales, postponing rent payments, etc. It refused to march on Versailles, fearing civil war.

Negotiations with Paris’s mayors and deputies failed. The Commune Council was officially proclaimed on 28 March.

=== Versailles reconquest and Bloody Week ===
The Versailles government reorganized its army, retook the Mont-Valérien fort, and on 21 May entered Paris. The ensuing Bloody Week crushed the insurrection.

=== The Commune in the provinces ===
Short-lived communes were proclaimed in several cities (Marseille, Lyon, Toulouse, Narbonne, Saint-Étienne, Le Creusot, etc.), but none matched the duration or radicalism of Paris.

== Contemporary reactions ==
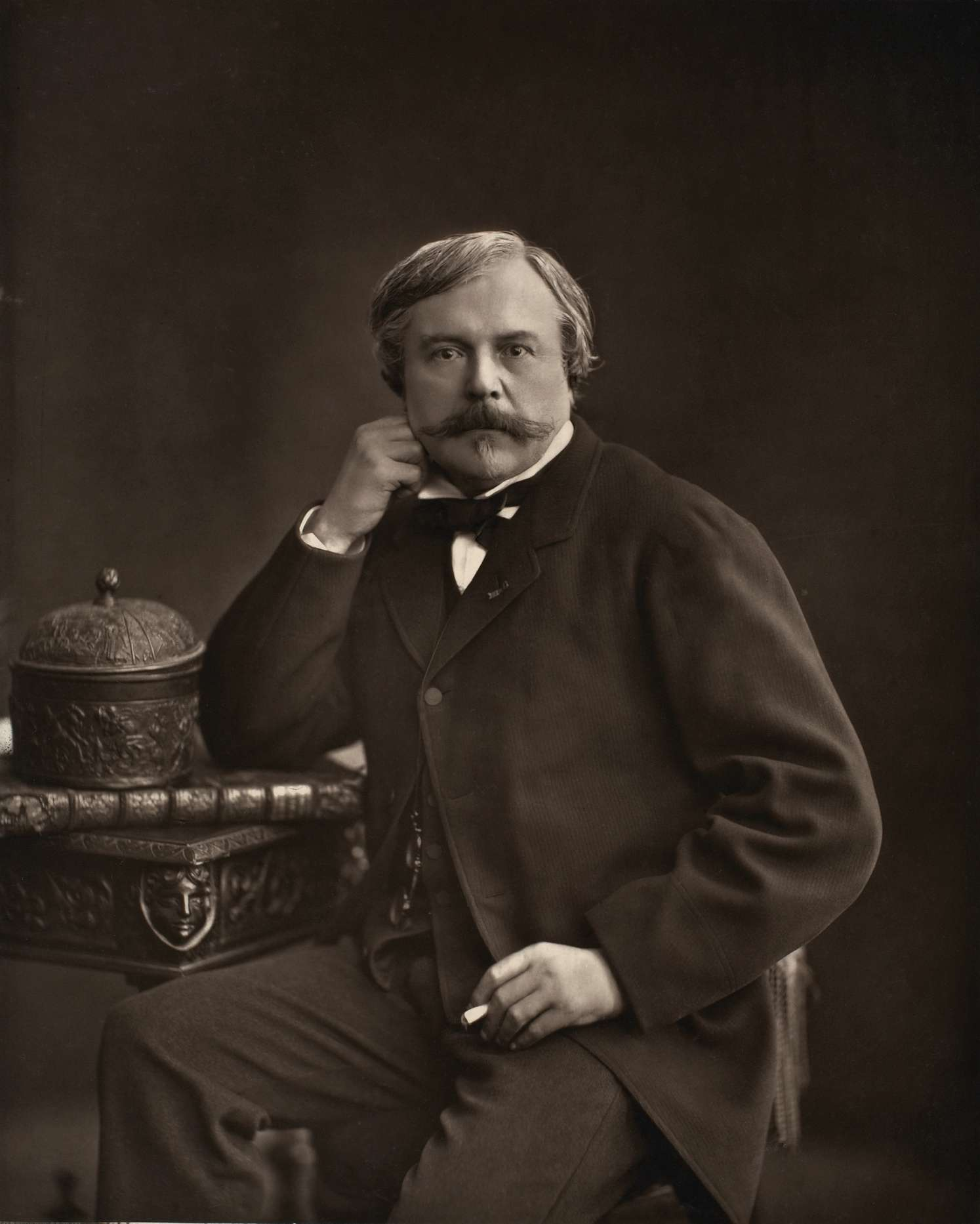
Edmond de Goncourt, photographed by Nadar

Major writers unanimously condemned the uprising. Théophile Gautier compared the insurgents to wild beasts released from a menagerie. Socialist and later republican memory, by contrast, celebrated 18 March as a popular victory and, from the 1880s, increasingly emphasised the martyrs of the Bloody Week.

== Historiography ==
Michel Cordillot argues that the uprising cannot be called an insurrection in the classic sense, because the chain of events was triggered by the government’s operation rather than by a revolutionary headquarters.

Jean-Pierre Azéma and Michel Winock go further, holding Thiers responsible both for provoking the revolt and for the army’s failure. They accuse him of cowardice and of fleeing prematurely, possibly hoping to provoke civil war in order to crush Parisian opposition once and for all. The execution of the two generals was exploited by Versailles propaganda (notably through Ernest-Charles Appert’s staged photomontages) to depict the Commune as barbaric, though the killings were spontaneous acts by an enraged crowd.

== See also ==
- Paris Commune
- Chronology of the Paris Commune
- Semaine sanglante
- Franco-Prussian War
- Government of National Defense
- Adolphe Thiers
- National Guard (France)
- Canut revolts
- June Days uprising
- French Revolution of 1848
- Louise Michel
- Montmartre
