= June Days uprising =

1848 riots by French workers against the closing of state-owned factories

June Days
- Part of the Revolutions of 1848
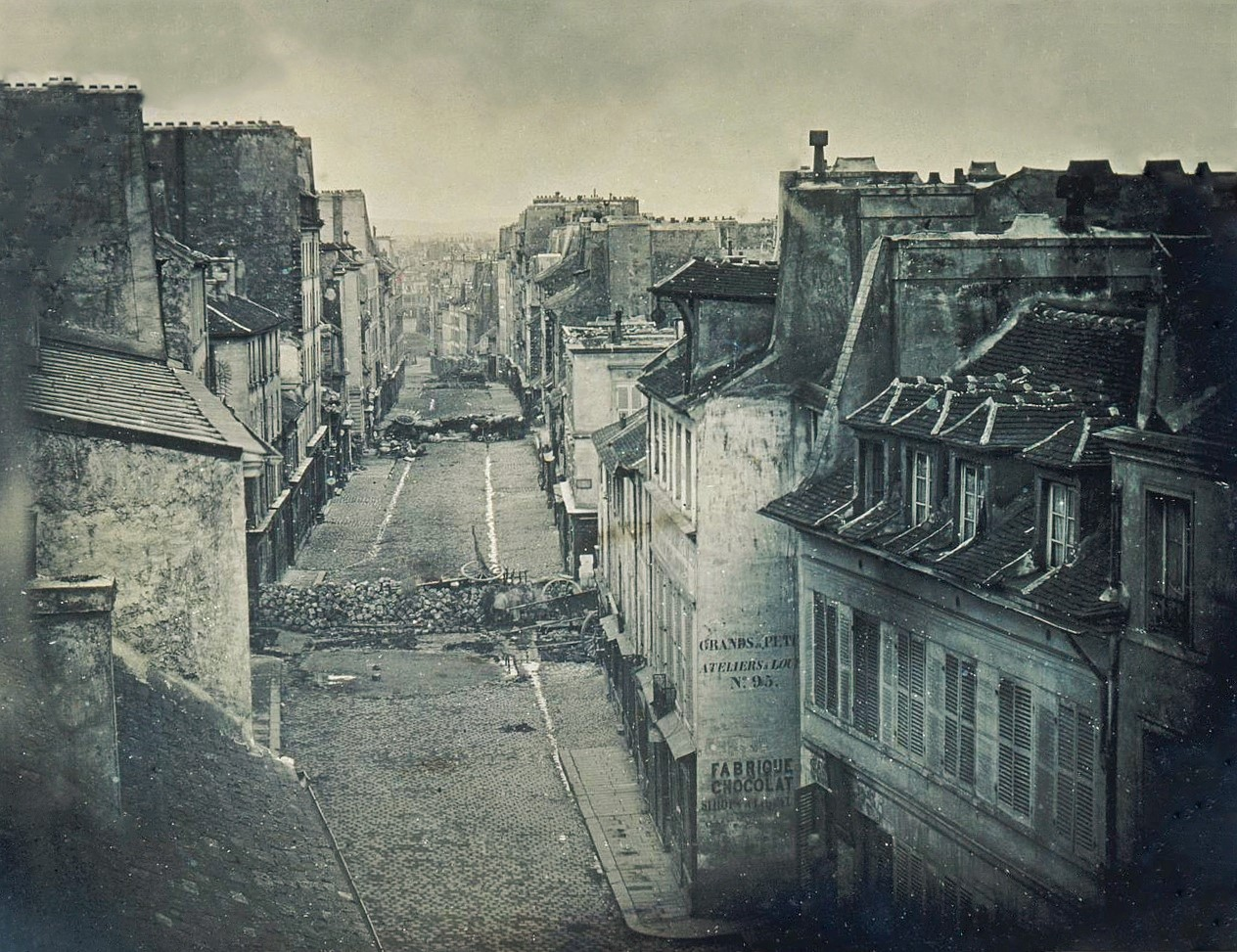
- Barricades on rue Faubourg-du-Temple, 25 June 1848. These are the first barricades ever photographed.
- Date: 22–26 June 1848
- Location: France
- Result: Uprising failed

Parties
French Second Republic: French Army; National Guard; Garde Mobile	Insurgents

Lead figures
Louis-Eugène Cavaignac	

Casualties and losses
Over 1,500 killed or wounded	3,000 killed 4,000 deported

The June Days (French: les journées de Juin) were an uprising staged by workers in Paris from 22 to 26 June 1848. It was in response to plans to close the National Workshops, created by the Second Republic in order to provide work and a minimal source of income for the unemployed. The National Guard, led by General Louis-Eugène Cavaignac, was called out to quell the rebellion. Over 4,500 people were either killed or injured, while 4,000 insurgents were deported to French Algeria. The uprising marked the end of the hopes of a "democratic and social republic" (république démocratique et sociale) and the victory of the liberals over the Radical Republicans.

== Background ==
Louis Philippe's July monarchy oversaw a period of internal turmoil in France. The provisional government of the French Second Republic was declared after the abdication of the king in February, which immediately enacted democratic reforms such as universal male suffrage. To combat unemployment, the Second Republic funded the National Workshops, which provided jobs and wages, through new taxes applied to landowners. Higher taxes alienated land owners and peasants, who subsequently opposed the national workshops. As a result, these land taxes were flouted, leading to a financial crisis for the Second Republic.

On 23 April 1848, a mainly moderate and conservative constituent assembly was elected, which was opposed by the Parisian public and radicals. Insurgents then invaded the assembly in the demonstration of 15 May 1848 to prevent their democratic republic from being "eroded away". The invasion was quickly thwarted; however, it sparked fear in conservatives, who had gained a majority of seats in the constituent assembly. Ultimately, the conservatives closed down the National Workshops, a decision which sparked the June uprising.

== Uprising ==
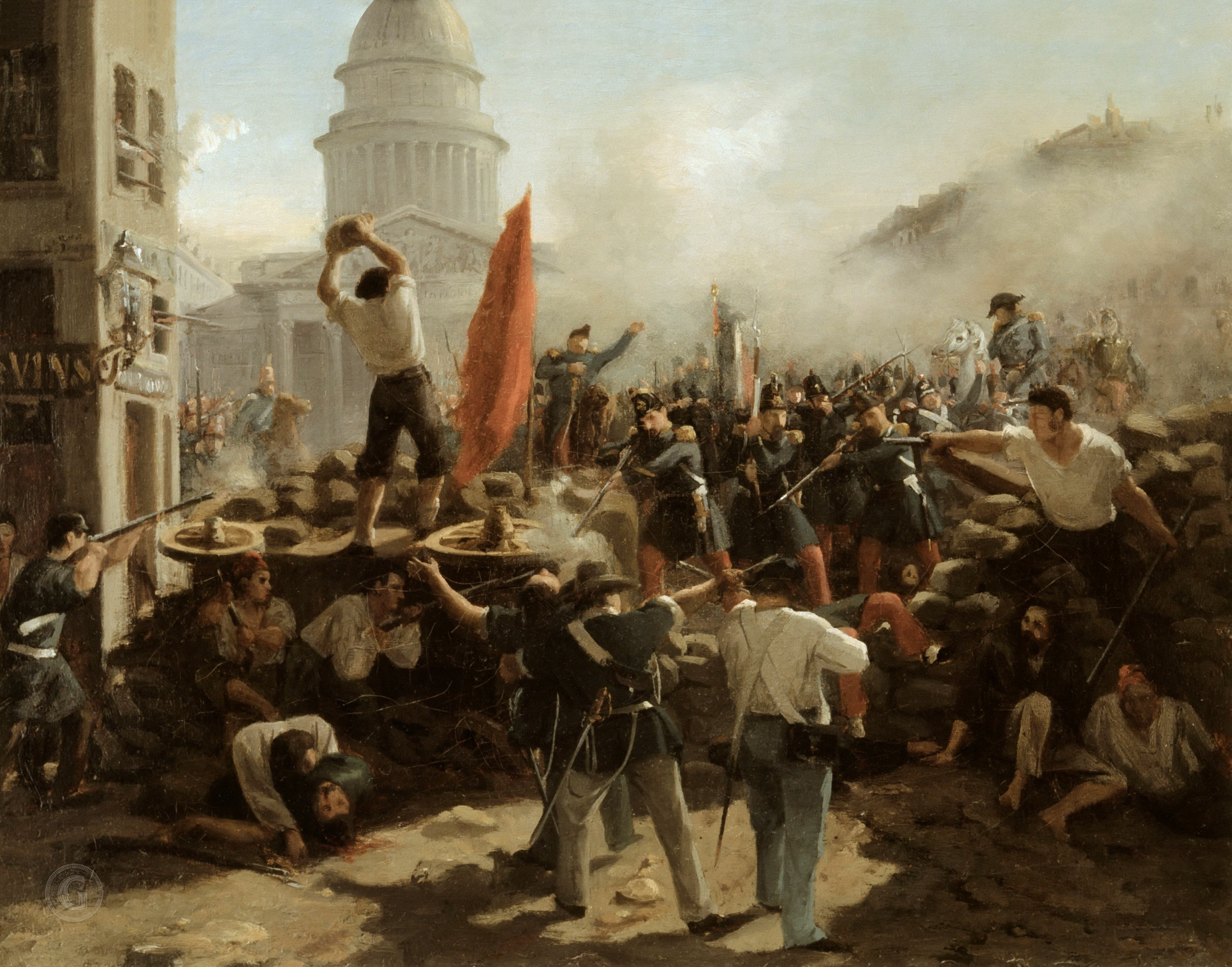
Painting of a barricade on Rue Soufflot (with the Panthéon behind), Paris, June 1848. By Horace Vernet.

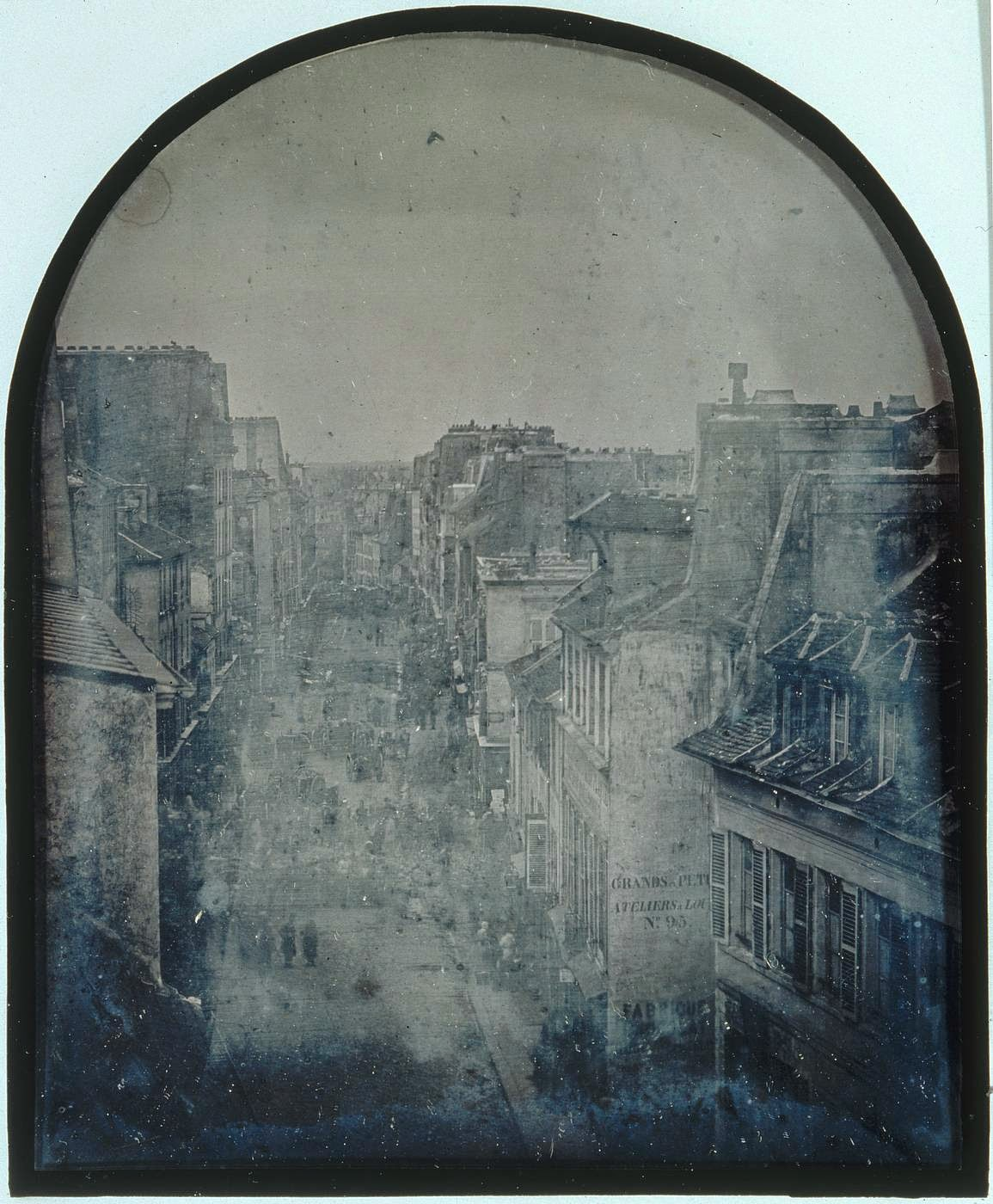
Rue du Faubourg-du-Temple after the attack by General Lamoricière's troops, 26 June 1848

On 23 June, Comte de Falloux's committee issued a decree stating that the Workshops would be closed in three days, and that although young men could join the army, provincials would have to return home or they could simply be dismissed. Outrage surrounding the closing of the Workshops increased, and culminated into an uprising. In sections of the city, hundreds of barricades were built which blocked transportation and reduced mobility. The National Guard was called out to halt the riot, but this produced a clash between the guard and the protestors.

Insurgents consisted of labourers who had built barricades out of broken stones. The strength of the National Guard was estimated to be over 40,000 guards; however, they were outnumbered by insurgents as they gained strength by recruiting citizens from their homes or forcing them to join. The insurgents also seized many armories to gather weaponry.

== Aftermath ==
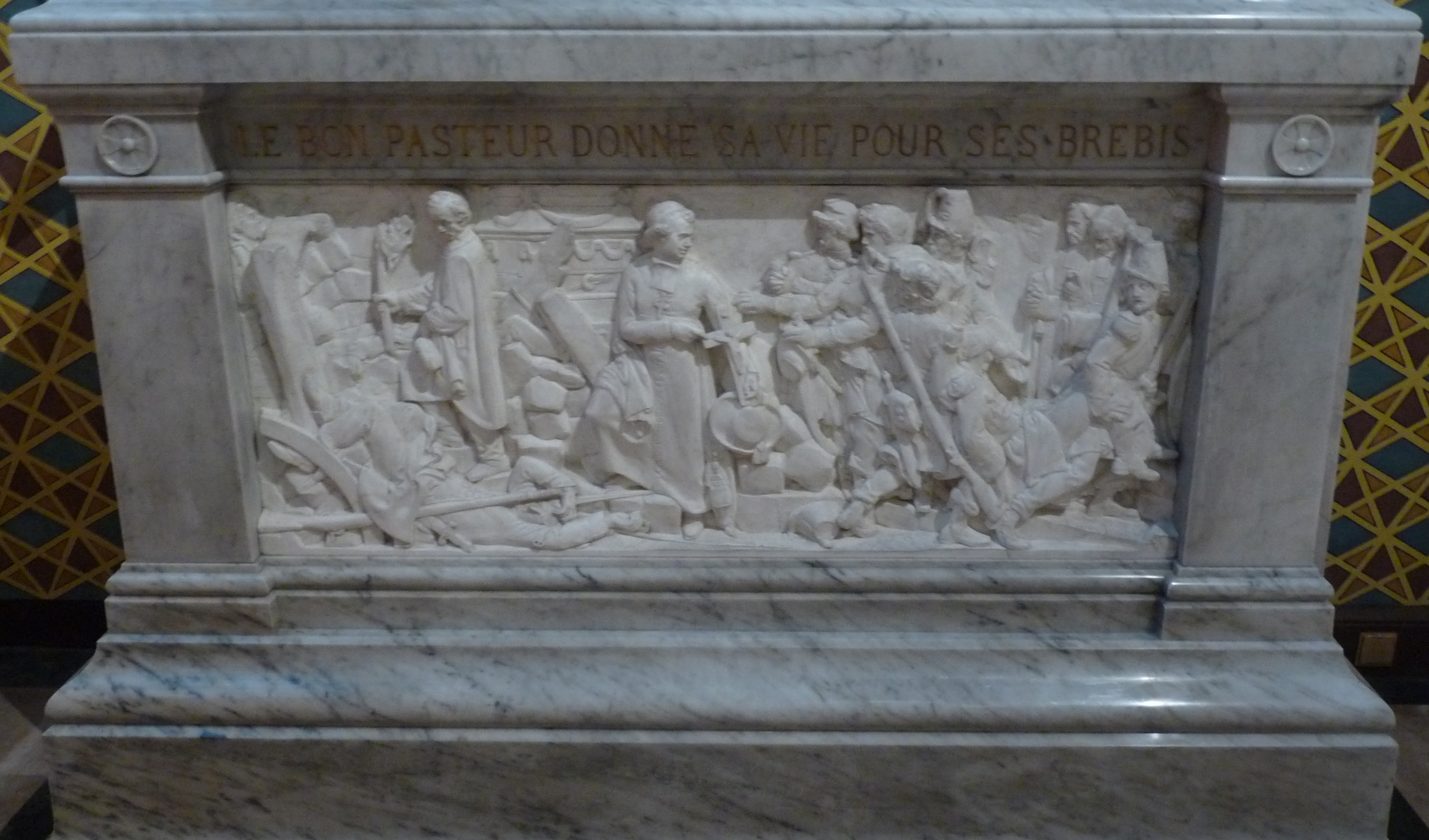
Relief sculpture on Affre's tomb showing the archbishop at the barricade. The text is from John 10:11 "The good shepherd gives his life for his sheep."

By 26 June, the uprising was over, resulting in the death or injury of about 1,500 troops and about 3,000 insurgents. A notable casualty was Denis Auguste Affre, the Archbishop of Paris, who was killed during peace negotiations. The Archbishop was led to believe that his presence at the barricades might be the means of restoring peace. He accordingly applied to General Cavaignac, who warned him of the risk he was about to incur. Soon afterwards, the firing having ceased at his request, he appeared on the barricade at the entrance to the Faubourg Saint-Antoine, accompanied by M. Albert, of the national guard, who wore the dress of a workingman, and bore a green branch as a sign of peace, and by Tellier, a devoted servant. Very shortly after, shots were heard, and the insurgents hastily returned fire towards the National Guard, thinking they were betrayed, killing the archbishop in the cross fire. The archbishop's public funeral occurred on 7 July. After the insurgents were crushed and arrested en masse, over 4,000 insurgents were deported to Algeria, and all hopes of a revolution were abandoned.

Five months following the June Uprising, the French Constitution of 1848 was adopted, handing executive powers to the president with a four-year term of office, allowing him to appoint ministers and other high-ranking officials. The constitution also provided for an Assembly of 750 legislators, for which public elections would take place every three years. After the constitution was enacted, the 1848 French presidential election was held and Louis-Napoleon Bonaparte was elected. After three years in power, Bonaparte staged a coup d'état, extending his mandate for ten years; he went on to establish the Second French Empire.

== See also ==
- The Eighteenth Brumaire of Louis Napoleon
- French Revolution of 1848
- History of the Left in France
- Uprising of March 18, 1871
