= Claude Lecomte =

French general

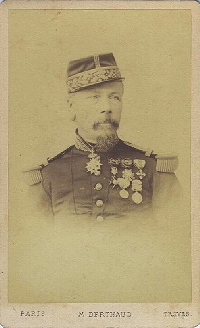
- Born: September 8, 1817; France Thionville
- Died: March 18, 1871 (aged 53) France Montmartre
- Service years: 1837–1871
- Rank: Général de Brigade
- Conflicts: Paris Commune; Paris uprising (1871) †

Claude Lecomte (September 8, 1817 – March 18, 1871) was a French general killed by the National Guard of the Paris Commune.

== Biography ==
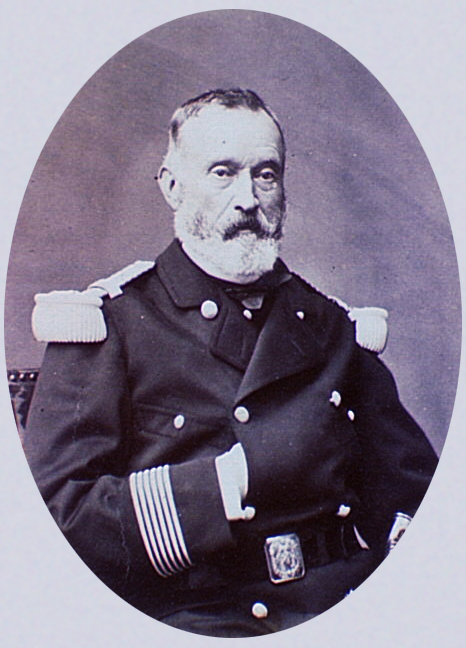
The killing of Generals Clement-Thomas (above) and Lecomte by national guardsmen on 18 March sparked the armed conflict between the French Army and the National Guard.

Lecomte graduated from the military academy of Saint Cyr in 1837, was promoted Colonel in August 1865 and in 1869 became second in command of the Prytanée National Militaire in La Flèche. Lecomte was promoted Brigadier General in 1870 and was part of the northern army commanded by General Louis Faidherbe during the Franco-Prussian War of 1870. Lecomte took part in the battles of Amiens, St. Quentin, and Pont-Noyelles. Back in Paris after the capitulation, when he replaced Admiral Viscount Fleuriot de Langle, commander of the sixth sector, he was placed temporarily at the head of a brigade of the new army of Paris and was appointed headmaster of La Flèche.

As Brigadier General he took part in the Siege of Paris. After the capitulation of the capital, he was appointed commander of the 2nd sector.

== Execution ==
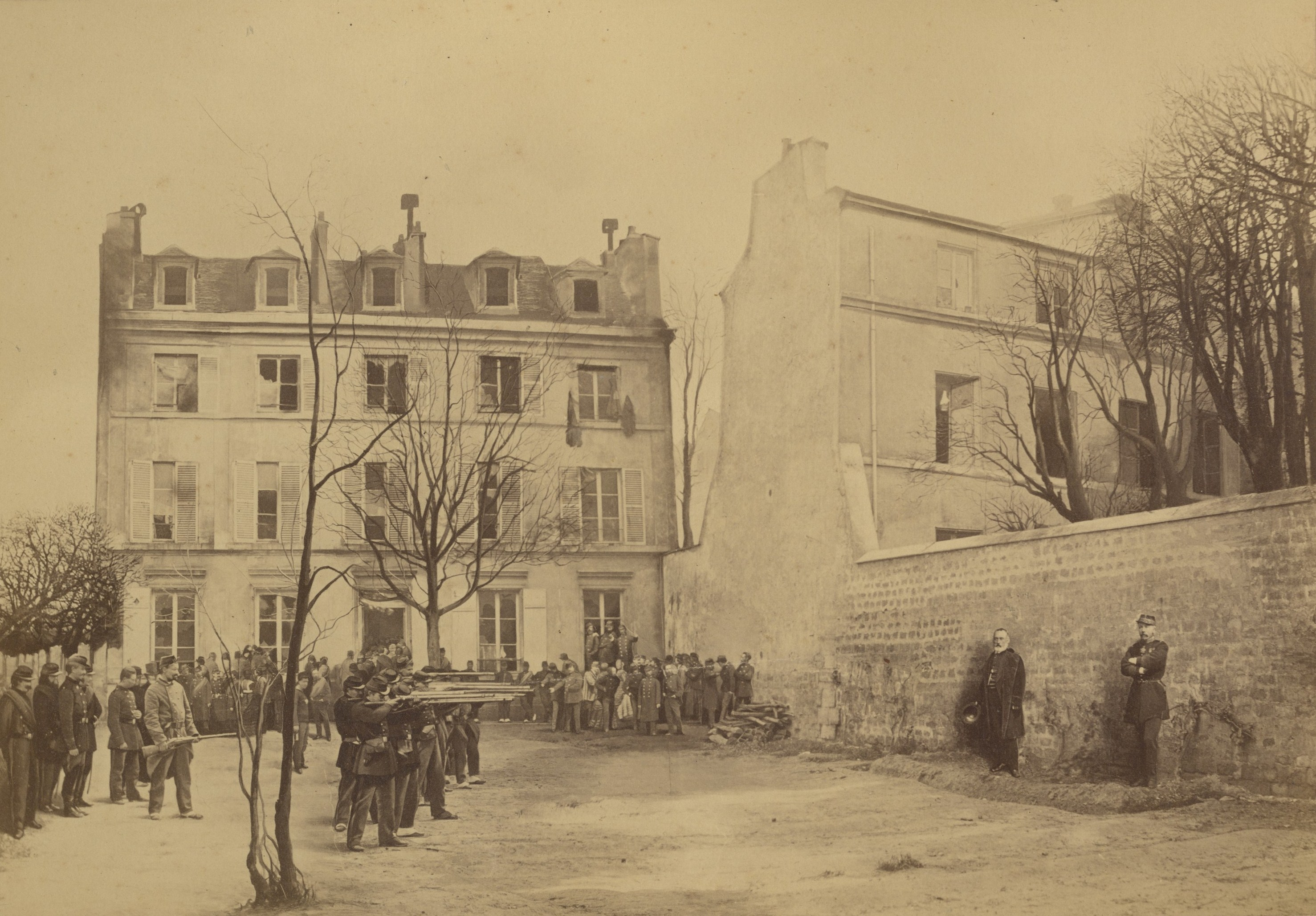
Assassinat des généraux Clément-Thomas et Lecomte, rue des Rosiers 6 à Montmartre - Photomontage d'Eugène Appert (Killing of Generals Clément-Thomas and Lecomte, 6 rue des Rosiers, Montmartre - Photomontage by Eugène Appert). Bibliothèque historique de la Ville de Paris.

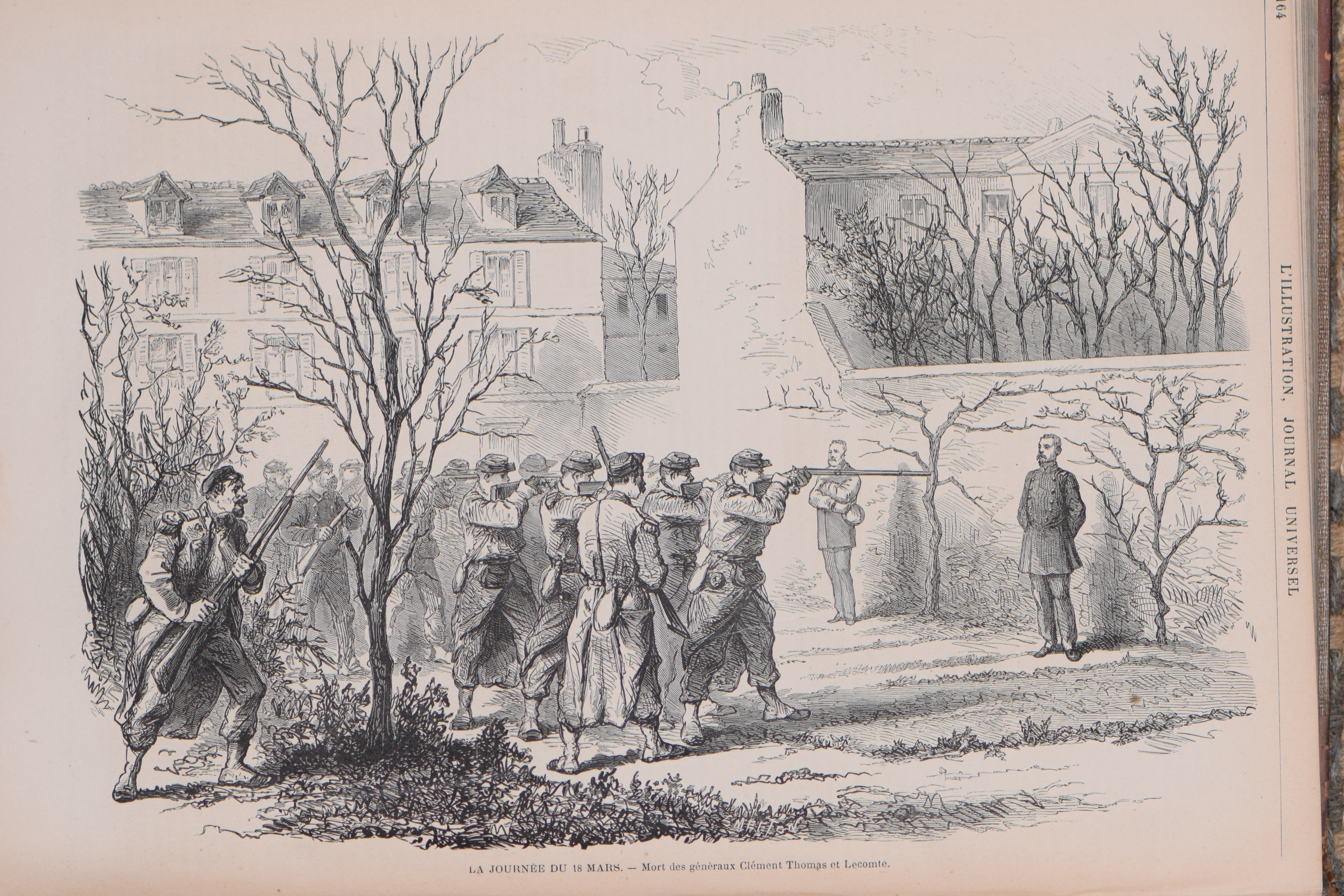
18 March 1871 General Jacques Leon Clement-Thomas is executed by the Commune

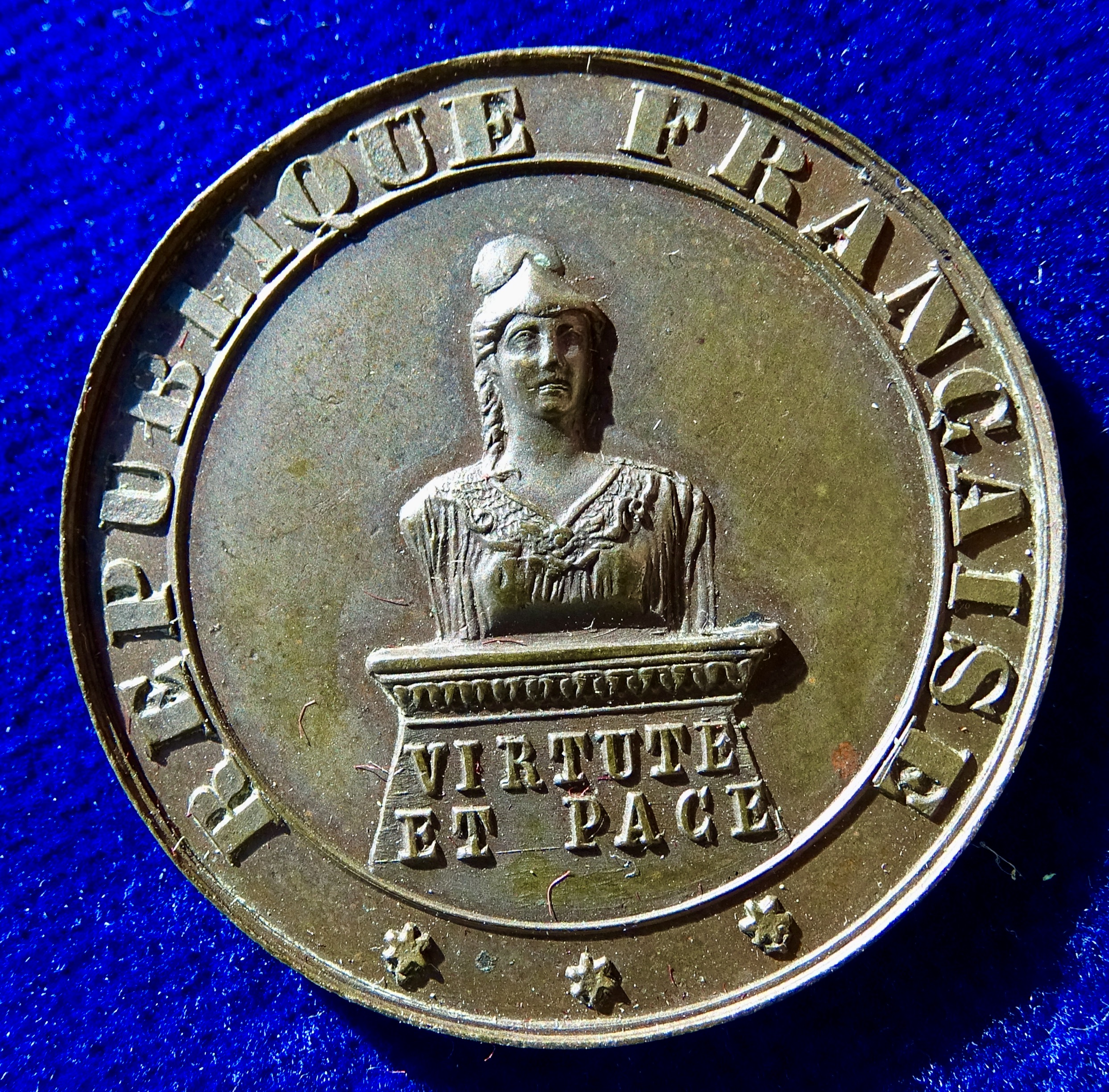
1871 medal commemorating the death penalty for the murder of the French Generals Lecomte and Thomas, obverse

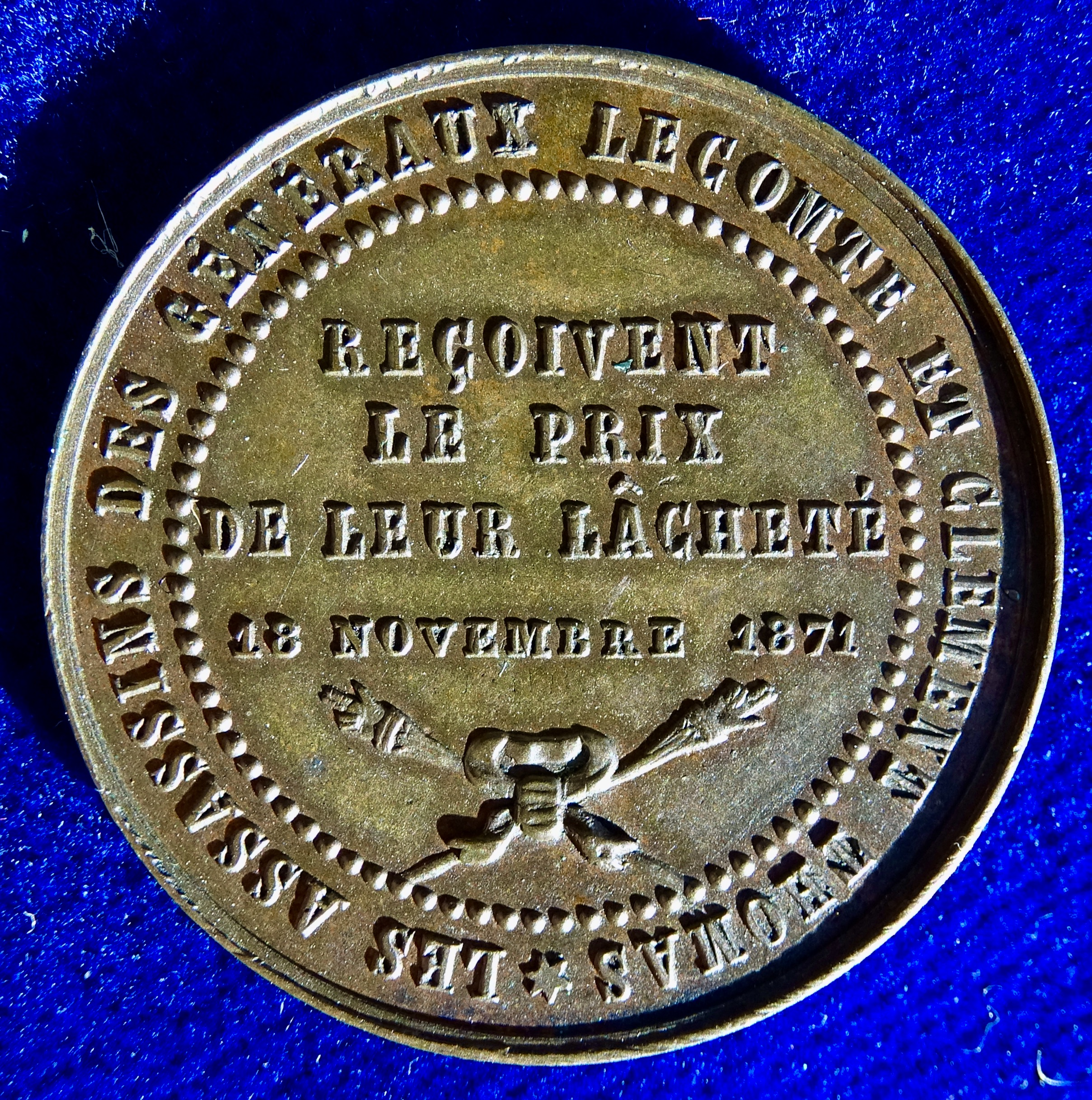
The reverse of this medal

He was about to leave for the provinces when the Uprising of March 18, 1871 broke out. The government of Adolphe Thiers charged Lecomte with retrieving cannons from Montmartre where the National Guard had brought them when the Prussians had advanced on the Champs Elysees. Lecomte waited in vain for his artillery teams to remove the cannon components. They were surrounded by a crowd opposing the removal of the guns, at which point Lecomte tried to withdraw, and then ordered his soldiers to load their weapons and fix bayonets. He thrice ordered them to fire, but the soldiers refused. Some of the officers were disarmed and taken to the city hall of Montmartre, under the protection of the mayor of the 18th arrondissement, and later prime minister, Georges Clemenceau. General Lecomte and the officers of his staff were seized by the guardsmen and his mutinous soldiers and taken to the local headquarters of the National Guard at the ballroom of the Château Rouge. The officers were pelted with rocks, struck, threatened, and insulted by the crowd. In the middle of the afternoon Lecomte and the other officers were taken to 6 Rue des Rosiers by members of a group calling themselves The Committee of Vigilance of the 18th arrondissement, who demanded that they be tried and executed. In the late afternoon, Lecomte was beaten and then shot in the back. Minutes later, another general, Jacques Leon Clément-Thomas, who was in civilian clothes, having reconnoitered the barricades of Montmartre, was recognized by the crowd, thrown on top of Lecomte's corpse, and slain in turn. Their bodies were left exposed at the site of the slaying for two days. A Doctor Guyon, who examined the bodies afterwards, found forty balls in the body of Clément-Thomas and nine balls in the back of Lecomte.

The legend that Generals Lecomte and Thomas were shot "in a regulation manner" by a firing squad was a fabrication: it is based on a photograph staged by the photographer Eugène Appert, which was taken in June, three months later. This photograph may have in turn been inspired by an engraving and report in the edition of L'Illustration of the 25th of March, 1871. There was even an activist theater production (La Commune, historical drama, 1908), which portrays a pseudo-trial of the two generals before their execution.

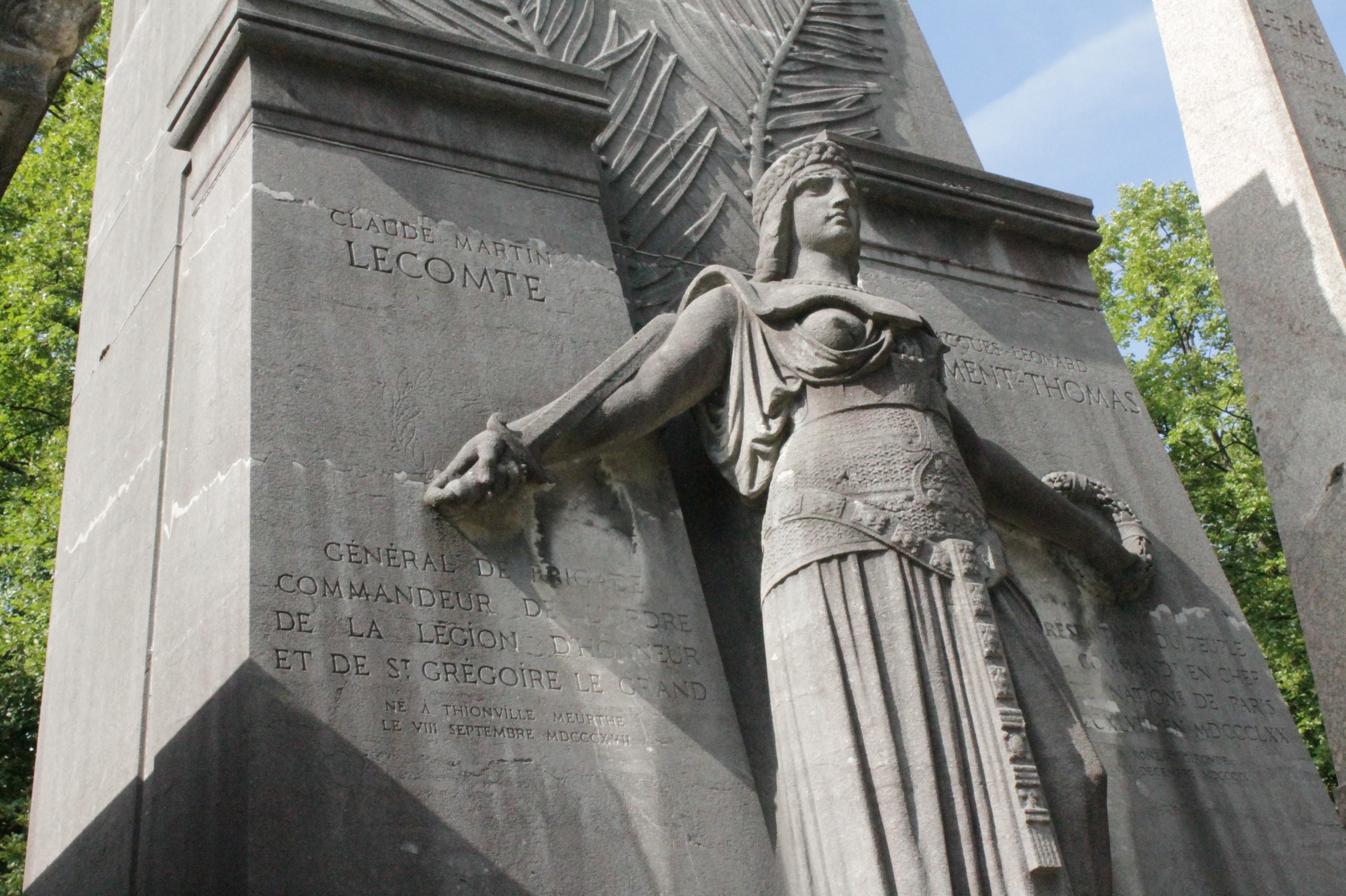
The monumental grave of Generals Lecomte and Thomas, Pere Lachaise Cemetery (detail)

According to the Commune history written in 1876 by Prosper-Olivier Lissagaray, when General Lecomte was arrested by his men, the Vigilance Committee of Montmartre issued an order to the commander of the National Guard responsible for guarding the General at the Château Rouge to ensure his protection. The order came just after Lecomte was moved from that location.

A monument to General Lecomte and Thomas was erected near the centre of Pere Lachaise Cemetery in Paris.

== Legacy ==
On 18 November 1871 a court-martial (le 6e Conseil de Guerre) handed down the death penalty to Simon Charles Mayer (1820 Nancy - 1887 Basel), major of the Paris Commune, for being responsible for the murder of the two generals Claude Lecomte, and Jacques Leonard Clement Thomas, in spite of weak evidence. In 1872 this sentence was commuted to life-long forced labour, and thereafter he was exiled to New Caledonia.
