= Insurrectionary communes in France in 1870–1871 =

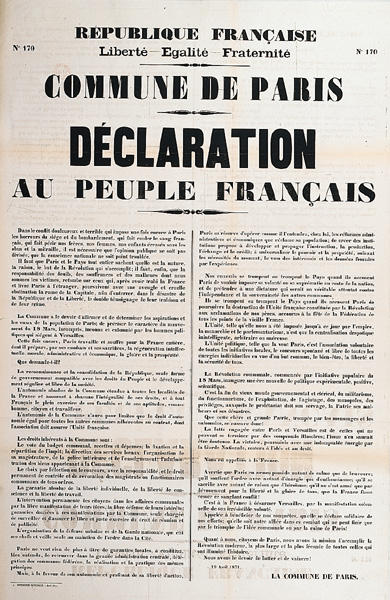
The Declaration to the French People of 1871 set out the plan to organize France as a federation of communes based on direct democracy.

The insurrectionary communes in France in 1870–1871 were communes distinguished by their refusal to acquiesce to two significant events: first, France's capitulation to Bismarck, and second, the submission to the authority of the Versailles government. In their stead, these communes espoused a new organization of the French Republic predicated on direct democracy, otherwise designated as communism. These communes were predominantly urban, and militarily organized around the National Guard. While the initial uprisings were led by the Commune of Lyon and the Marseille Commune, the most consequential was the Commune of Paris. Other communes of note included the Saint-Étienne Commune, the Narbonne Commune, and the Commune of Le Creusot. Moreover, numerous other French communes witnessed insurrectionary movements after the Franco-Prussian War.

The military forces of the insurgents were decisively defeated by the Versailles government during the 1871 campaign in the interior, which represented the final major episode of the civil war in France. The events of Bloody Week (Semaine sanglante) have left an indelible mark on the collective memory of the nation.

== Chronology ==
The first commune to be established was that of Lyon, where the new republic was proclaimed ahead of Paris on September 4, 1870. This initial commune persisted until January of the following year, after which it recommenced from March to April. It was succeeded by Marseille Commune, established on October 31, 1870, and was presided over by Adolphe Joseph Carcassonne, before control was once again regained by Prefect Alphonse Gent.

Following the proclamation of the Paris Commune on March 18, 1871, provincial Communes emerged with greater rapidity, though they were ephemeral:

- In Marseille Commune, a second commune took place from March 23 to April 5, 1871, under the command of Gaston Crémieux.
- In Saint-Étienne Commune, the insurrection lasted only a few days, from March 24 to 28.
- In Narbonne Commune, from March 24 to 31, led and declared by Émile Digeon.
- In Toulouse, from March 24 to 27.
- In Perpignan, on March 25.
- In Le Creusot Commune, on March 26, led by Jean-Baptiste Dumay.
- In Grenoble, on April 16.
- In Bordeaux, from April 16 to 18.
- In Nîmes, on May 18.

Other uprisings occurred in Limoges, Périgueux, Cuers, Foix, Rouen, and Le Havre.

== List of Communes ==
=== Brest ===
In October 1870, a worker named Constant Le Doré proposed that the city establish a commune, emulating the models of Paris, Lyon, and Marseille. He established a committee to facilitate this initiative, but the authorities apprehended all the committee members a few days later. On October 27, 1870, the committee members were brought before a military court. Le Doré and Coupat, identified as the movement leaders, were sentenced to two years of imprisonment.

=== Le Creusot (March 26–28, 1871) ===
The Commune of Le Creusot was a brief insurrection that was proclaimed in Le Creusot, located in the French region of Saône-et-Loire, by Jean-Baptiste Dumay on March 26, 1871. This insurrection was subsequently suppressed two days later.

=== Lyon (September 4, 1870 – May 1, 1871) ===
Following the defeat at Sedan on September 4, 1870, a group of radical militants seized the city hall and proclaimed the Republic. The International Workingmen's Association became involved, with activists such as Bakunin forming a "Committee for the Salvation of France." This movement was suppressed on September 28.

On the night of March 22–23, 1871, the city hall was once again occupied with the assistance of those who had participated in the September 28 event. On March 25, Mayor Jacques-Louis Hénon declared the arrival of the defenders from Belfort, thereby ending the insurrection.

In the district of La Guillotière, an area that was a stronghold for the movement, the red flag continued to be flown over the local government building. On April 30, 1871, following calls from Gaston Caulet du Tayac, a delegate of the Paris Commune, members of the National Guard prevented the holding of regular municipal elections, and the population erected barricades. Armed resistance against government forces followed but was defeated that same evening.

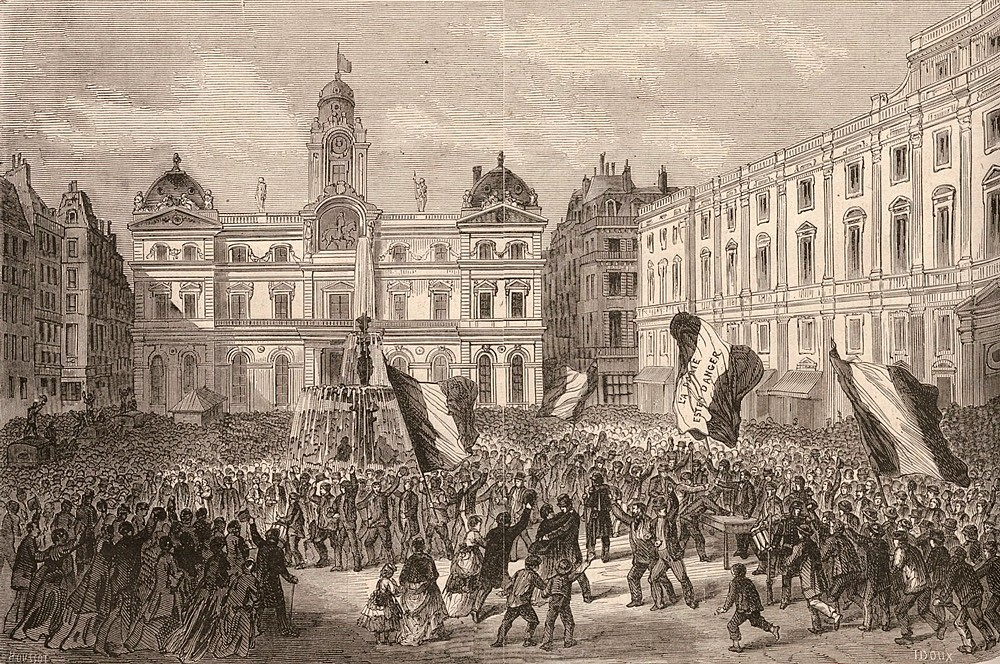
Capture of the Lyon town hall on September 4, 1870, and proclamation of the Republic, the starting point of the Lyon Commune.

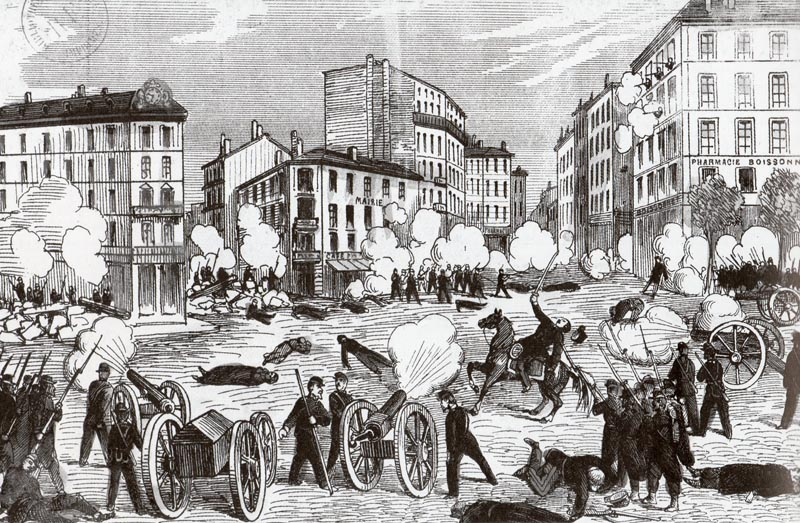
The army's last stand against the insurgents entrenched around La Guillotière town hall, on April 30 and May 1, 1871.

=== Marseille (March 22 – April 5, 1871) ===
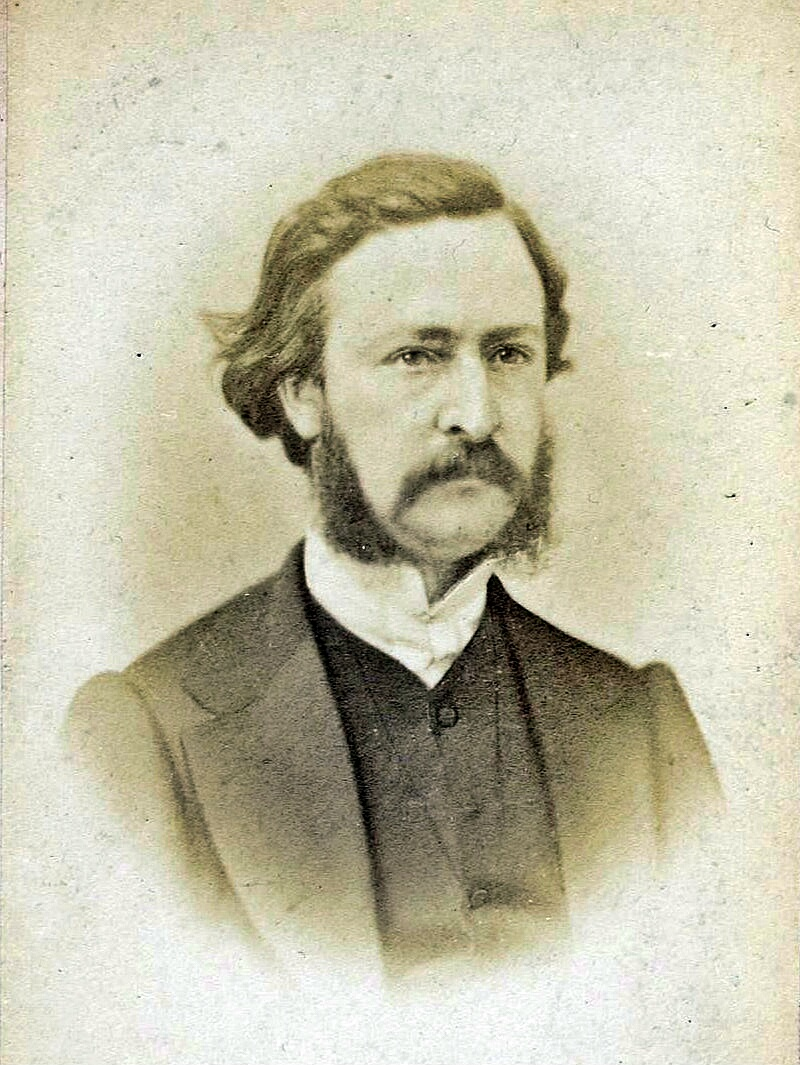
Gaston Crémieux was the key player in these events.

On August 7, 1870, an insurrection was initiated by Gaston Crémieux, Émile Bouchet, Maurice Rouvier, and Gustave Naquet, resulting in the seizure of the prefecture and, the following day, the city hall. The insurgents were apprehended and subsequently convicted, receiving prison sentences of no more than a year by the end of the month.

In the aftermath of the Republic's proclamation on September 4, the insurgents were released, met with widespread acclaim. However, the most radical republicans, organized within the Ligue du Midi and led by Crémieux, soon engaged in conflict with the provisional government. On October 31, 1870, another insurrection erupted, leading to the proclamation of a Commune, with Alphonse Esquiros at the helm of the Municipal Commission. Prefect Alphonse Gent restored order and reported to the provisional government on November 13 that calm had returned.

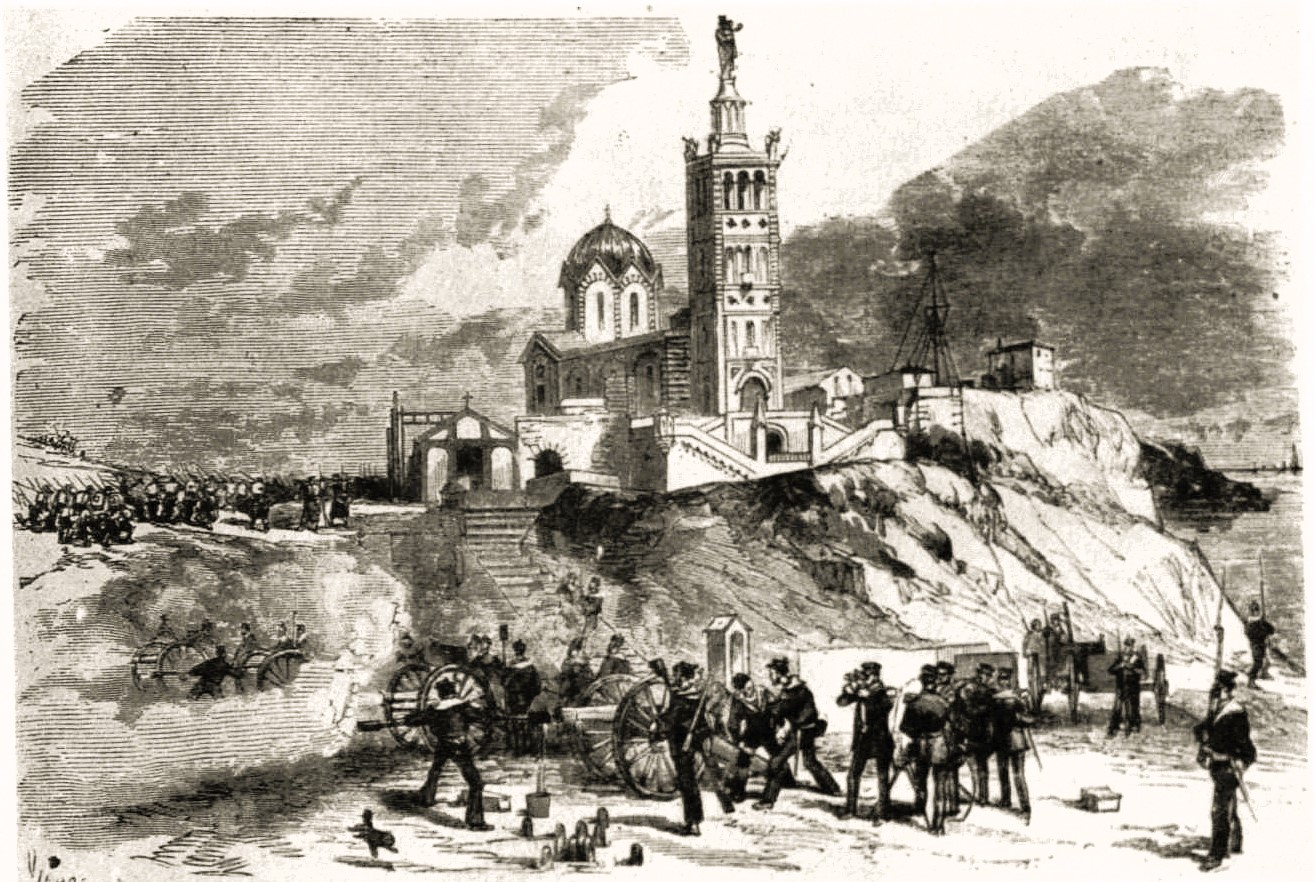
The army bombarding Marseille insurgents from Notre-Dame-de-la-Garde, nicknamed "Notre-Dame-de-la-Bombarde", on April 4 and 5, 1871, the last episode of the Marseille Commune.

Four days after the commencement of the Parisian uprising, a third insurrection occurred on March 22, 1871. This insurrection was led by Crémieux in collaboration with Clovis Hugues, who was prominently displaying the red flag. The insurgents seized the prefecture, where Crémieux proclaimed solidarity with Paris and welcomed representatives arriving to offer their support.

Crémieux was confronted with the challenge of navigating internal dissensions, his concern for maintaining order and public services, and the desertion of numerous officials.

On April 4, 1871, General Henri Espivent de La Villesboisnet forces successfully overcame the Commune in Marseille. The following day, the triumphant troops paraded, proclaiming, "Long live Jesus! Long live the Sacred Heart!" Following the restoration of governmental authority through force, the clubs were closed, the National Guard was disarmed and dissolved, and censorship was reinstated. This marked the onset of a period known as the "Moral Order (Third French Republic)," which lasted for five years.

=== Narbonne (March 24–31, 1871) ===
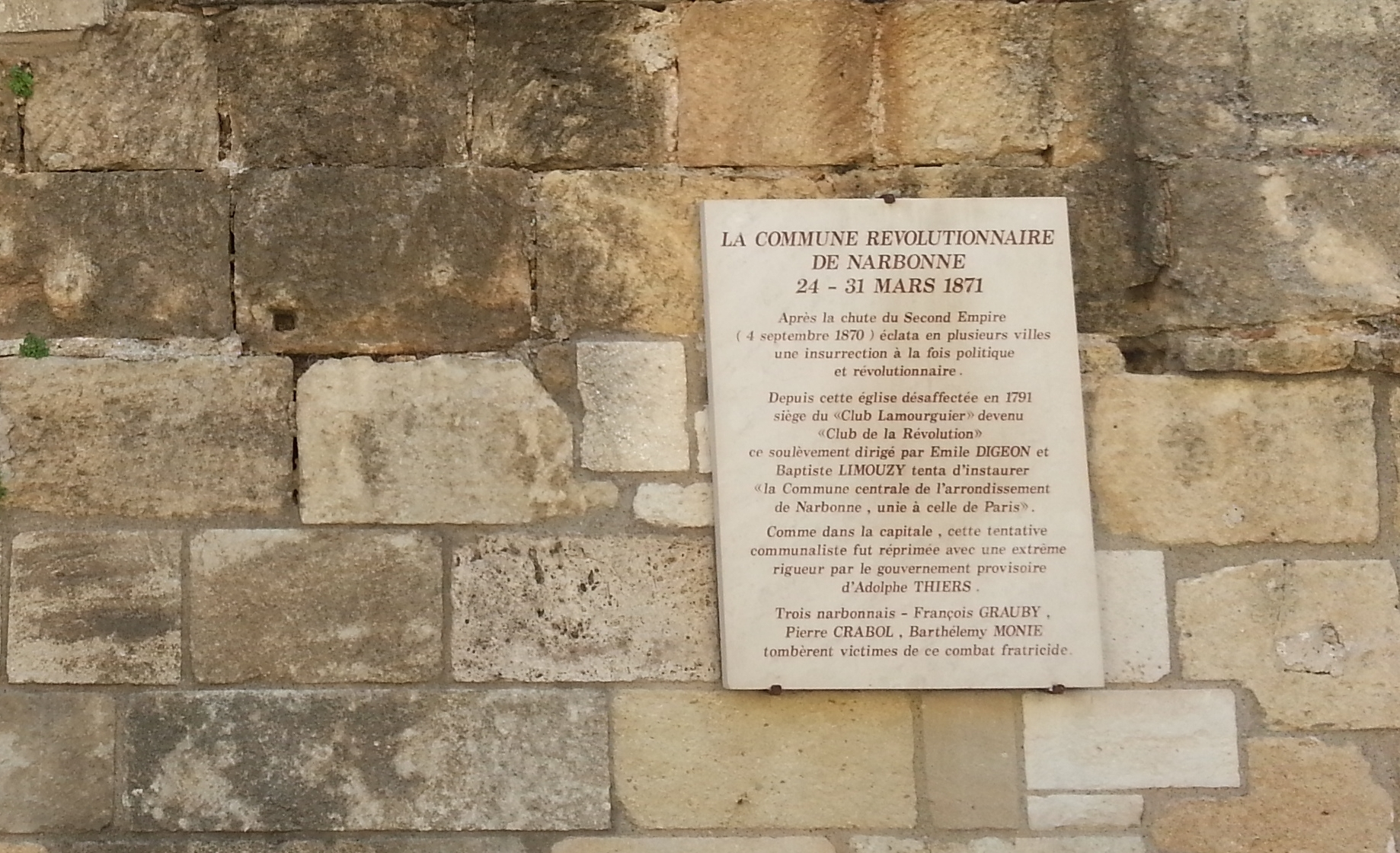
Commemorative plaque of the Narbonne Commune, wall of Saint-Étienne Commune.

In the aftermath of the Uprising of March 18, 1871, members of the "Revolution Club" appealed to Émile Digeon, urging him to spearhead a popular insurrection. Between March 24 and March 31, 1871, they successfully captured the central districts of the city, effectively mobilizing support for their cause.

=== Paris (March 18–May 28, 1871) ===
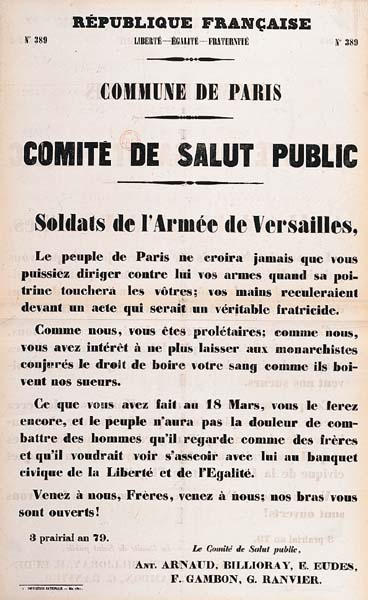
Poster from the Comité de Salut public de la Commune de Paris.

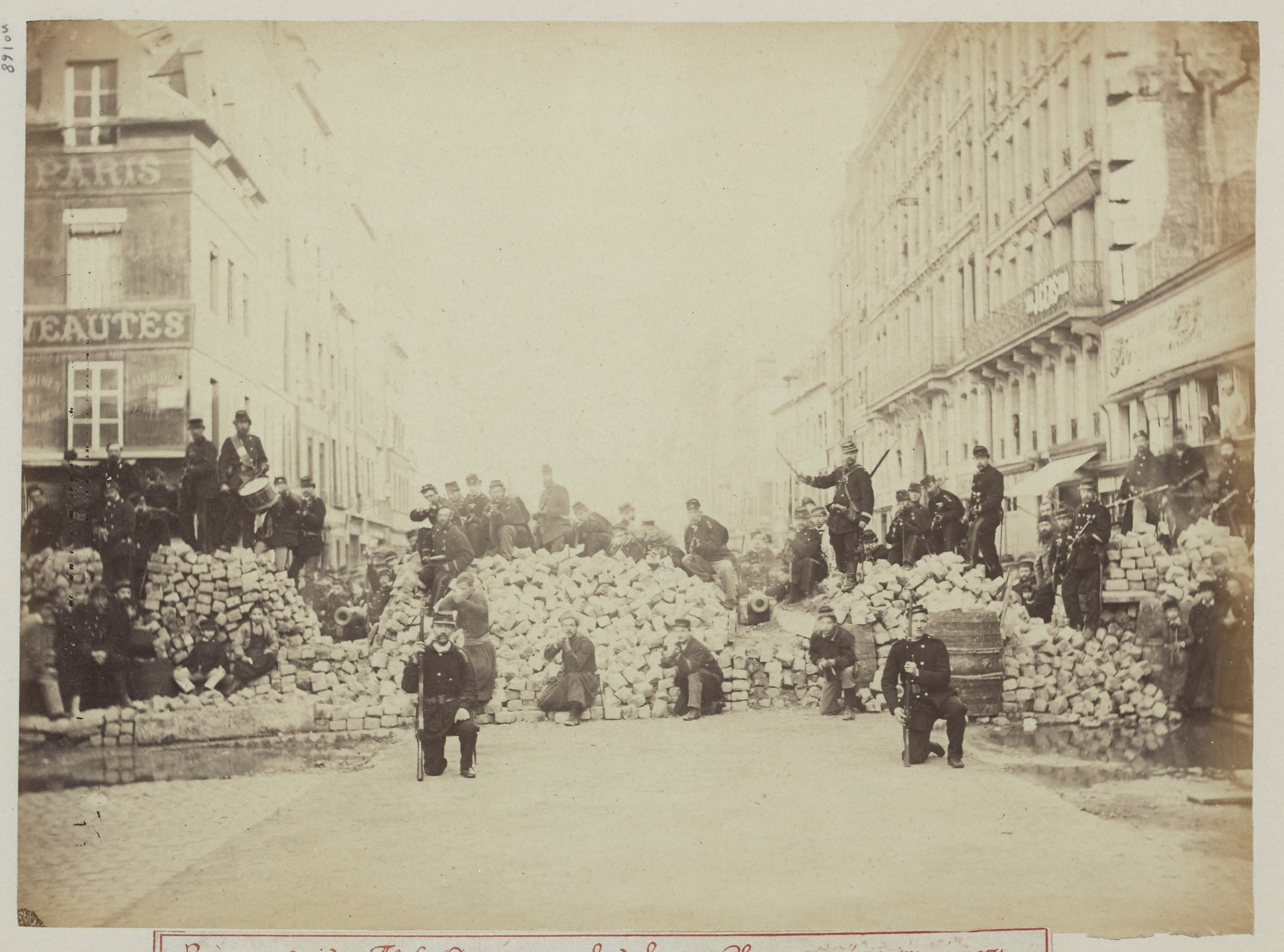
Faubourg Saint-Antoine barricade, Uprising of March 18, 1871.

The sequence of events commenced on March 18, 1871, during the uprising, when the National Guard reclaimed the cannons of Montmartre. These cannons had been purchased by the Parisians and subsequently seized by the army under the orders of Adolphe Thiers.

The Commune was ultimately suppressed by Versailles troops during the Bloody Week (Semaine sanglante) from May 21 to May 28, 1871.

=== Saint-Étienne (March 24–28, 1871) ===
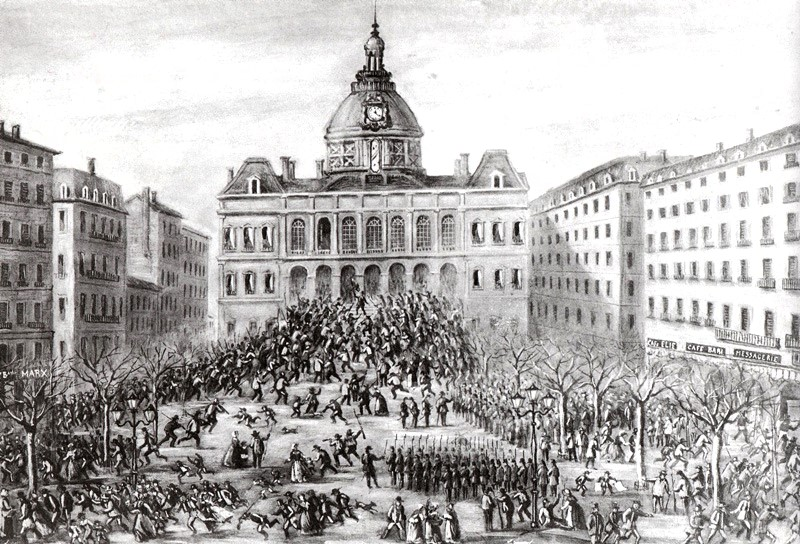
Capture of the town hall by the people of Saint-Etienne on March 24, 1871, the starting point of the short-lived Saint-Étienne Commune.

In the aftermath of the Paris insurrection, sympathizers convened to discuss the ongoing events. Five days later, on March 23, 1871, following the Lyon Commune, a delegation formally demanded the resignation of the municipal council. When the council refused, the subsequent day, the crowd stormed the town hall and proclaimed the Commune. The National Guard, deployed by Prefect Henri de L'Espée, sided with the insurrection, and Prefect L'Espée died under unclear circumstances on March 25, 1871, leading to a loss of popular support for the movement.

Following the dissolution of the revolutionary committee, which occurred on March 28, 1871, without any organized opposition, numerous participants were subjected to deportation.

=== Toulouse (March 25–27, 1871) ===
On March 25, 1871, at the Capitole, the actor Saint-Gaudens, a captain in the National Guard, vociferously proclaimed the "Declaration of the Revolutionary Commune of Toulouse," authored by Armand Duportal. Duportal subsequently sought to negotiate with Versailles, asserting that public order had not been disrupted. Concurrently, royalist treasurer-general François de Carbonel established a "battalion of order."

The calls for calm issued by Public Prosecutor (France) Louis Delcurrou averted bloodshed. On March 27, regular army forces retook the prefecture and town hall. Edmond Valette, an officer involved in the movement, was appointed provisional mayor.

=== Besançon ===
The Commune of Besançon never materialized beyond the planning stage, having been genuinely conceived and prepared by revolutionary supporters with assistance from the future Jura Federation. Despite an insurrectionary atmosphere and armed supporters organized from Switzerland, as reported by many local notables, correspondence from James Guillaume and Mikhail Bakunin reveals plans to launch the uprising between late May and early June 1871. However, the onset of Bloody Week led to the serious undermining and ultimate abandonment of all insurrectionary attempts in Besançon.

== See also ==
- History of anarchism
- Municipalism and communalism

== Bibliography ==
- Gaillard, Jeanne (1971). Communes de province, Commune de Paris (1870-1871) [Communes de province, Commune de Paris (1870-1871)] (in French). Flammarion.
- Lejeune, Dominique (2016). La France des débuts de la IIIe République, 1870-1896 [Early France of the Third Republic, 1870-1896] (in French).
