= Marseille Commune =

Insurrection in Marseille, France

Marseille Commune Commune de Marseille
- 22 March – 5 April 1871 (14 days)
- Status: Unrecognized commune
- Common languages: French
- Government: Autonomous commune administered under principles of direct democracy
- Leader
  - 1871: Gaston Crémieux
- History
  - Established: 22 March 1871
  - Disestablished: 5 April 1871
Preceded by	Succeeded by
Government of National Defense	French Third Republic

The Marseille Commune was an insurrectionary communalist movement declared in solidarity with the Paris Commune uprising of March 18, 1871. It aimed to support the nascent republic against the maneuvers of the "Versaillais" and to enable the city of Marseille to govern its own interests. The movement united republicans, moderates, Blanquists, socialists, and members of the First International of various persuasions.

Officially led by a departmental commission that replaced the prefect, the revolutionary commune appointed lawyer-poet Gaston Crémieux as its leader. However, it quickly faced internal divisions. Unable to fulfill its legal responsibilities, it was overtaken by incompetent and violent Parisian delegates. To prevent it from organizing elections and gaining democratic legitimacy, the Versaillais general Henri Espivent de La Villesboisnet declared it illegal and deployed troops against it. The commune was brutally suppressed between the night of April 4 and April 5, 1871, extinguishing the Paris Commune's last hope of gaining provincial support. While its roots trace back to the first insurrection of November 1, 1870, the Marseille Commune lasted only fourteen days, from March 22 to April 5, 1871.

== History ==
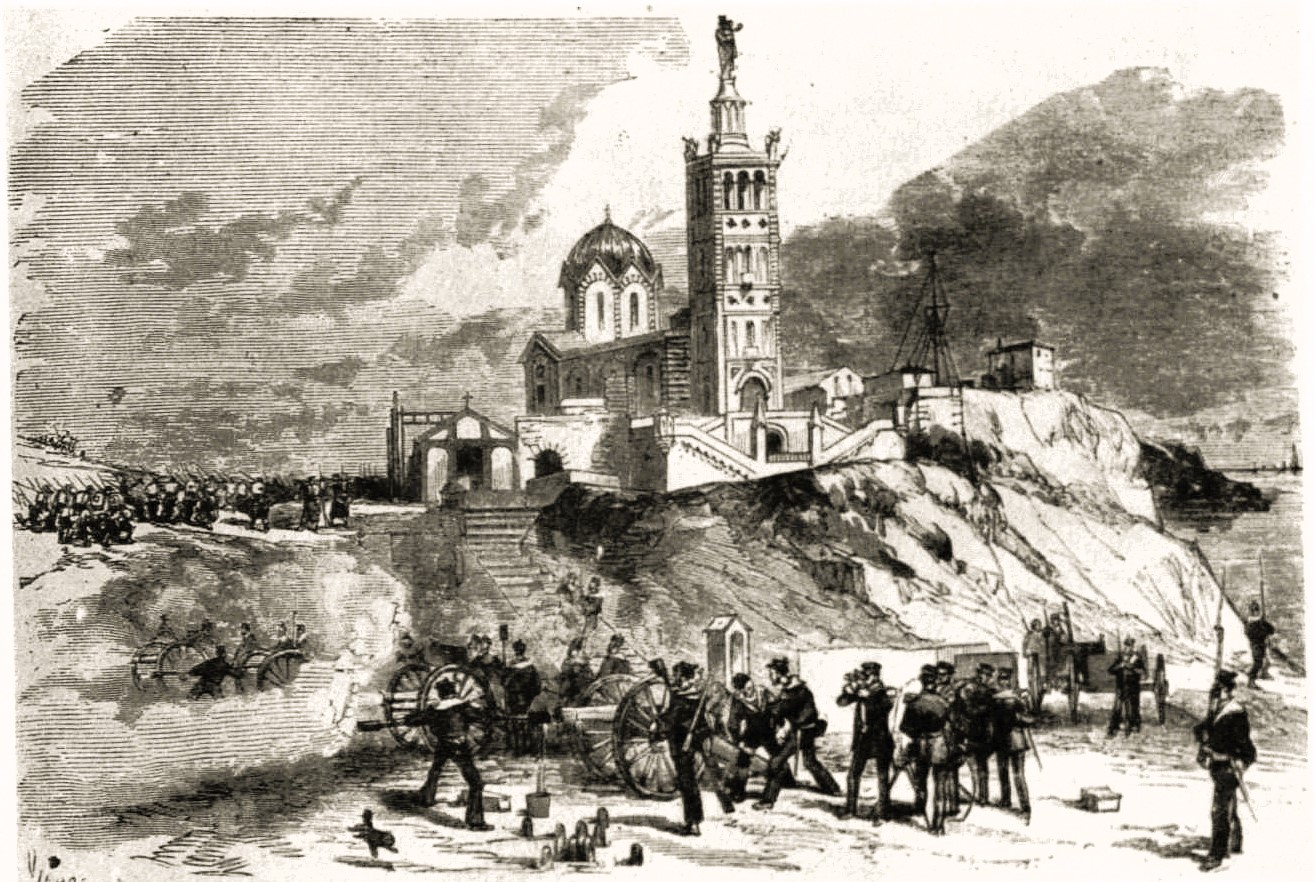
The army bombarding the Marseille insurgents from Notre-Dame-de-la-Garde, nicknamed "Notre-Dame-de-la-Bombarde".

The origins of the Marseille Commune lie in the final days of the Second Empire. Republican sentiments were strong in the city, with Marseille's mayors, though moderate, being firmly committed to republican ideals. Additionally, from 1865, the most radical Marseille Freemasons developed a robust mutual aid policy through education, uniting a wide range of opponents to Napoleon III.

The "La Réunion des Amis choisis" lodge of the Grand Orient, composed of republicans and Blanquists, established a "Central Initiative Committee of the Lodges" on February 11, 1868, with ten members: lawyer Gaston Crémieux, Barne, Brochier, Carriol, Chappuis, de Pleuc, Dhionnet, Massip, Rouvier, and Adolphe Royannez. Concurrently, the "Phocaean Association for Education, Instruction, and Education of Both Sexes" and the "Central Relief Fund" were founded.

Meanwhile, new press freedoms led to a proliferation of republican newspapers, closely monitored and often prosecuted by the police but highly active, including Le Peuple, edited by Gustave Naquet. In 1869, Léon Gambetta, then a radical, was elected deputy for Bouches-du-Rhône. Crémieux initiated Gambetta into the "La Réforme" lodge, where future commune actors like Rouvier, Naquet, and Esquiros were active.

Following the collapse of the Second Empire in the face of Bismarck's Prussia, with power vacant, France established a provisional government led by Gambetta. In Marseille, an initial insurrection signaled the fragility and intensity of these new times.

=== From one insurrection to another ===
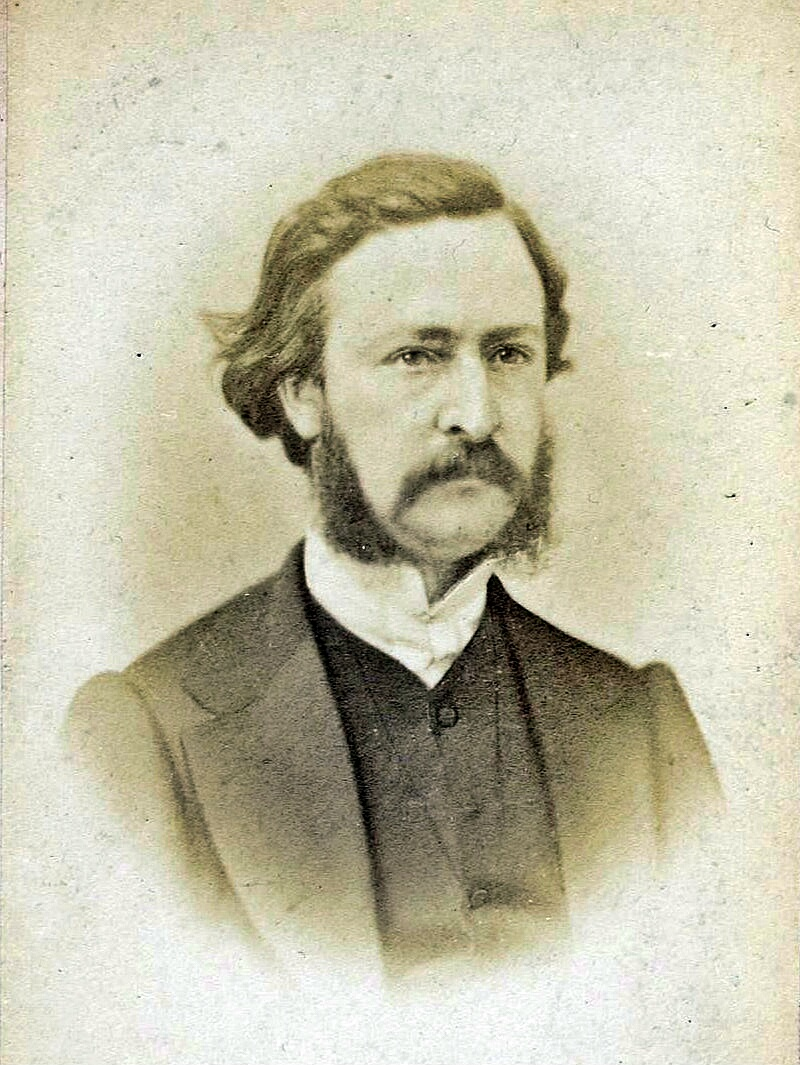
Gaston Crémieux, from the commune collection.

On August 7, 1870, the first popular insurrection, led by Gaston Crémieux, Émile Bouchet, Maurice Rouvier, and Gustave Naquet, stormed the prefecture. That evening, these radicals met on Rue Vacon with socialists, formed an action committee, and the next day seized the town hall, establishing a revolutionary committee led by Crémieux, Paul Giraud, Clovis Hugues, Félix Granet, Cabasse, municipal employee Joseph Tardif, journalists Auguste Sorbier and Armand Elbert, Internationalists Charles Alerini, Étienne-Louis Combes, Victor Bosc, Philibert Gilbert, Frédéric Bordes, Auguste Conteville, and Célestin Matheron, joined by entrepreneur Félix Debray, shoemaker Joseph Maviel, mason Esprit Tourniaire, and employee Eugène Barthélémy.

This initial movement was harshly suppressed by the local administration, loyal to imperial laws. The "rebels" were imprisoned in a dungeon at Fort Saint-Jean. On August 27, a court-martial sentenced the leaders: Pierre Bernard, Tardif, Barthélémy, and Giraud to one month; Tourniaire to three; Crémieux, Combe, Bosc, and Sorbier to six; Bordes to eight; and Conteville, Gilbert, Debray, and Maviel to one year. On September 4, 1870, the day the Republic was proclaimed, they were freed; Gambetta confirmed their release as a large crowd greeted the prisoners. That day, Gambetta appointed Alphonse Esquiros as senior administrator of Bouches-du-Rhône, with Adolphe Carcassonne as president of this first commune; the tricolor flag was raised at the town hall. On September 7, Crémieux welcomed Esquiros at Saint-Charles station and escorted him to the prefecture.

Meanwhile, the creation of the Ligue du Midi (15 departments), led locally by Esquiros, Bastélica, and Crémieux, strengthened the republican pole. However, conflicts emerged within Marseille's municipal council between moderate republicans and Blanquists. These peaked when Esquiros, the senior administrator, lost Gambetta's confidence due to illegal decrees (suspending the legitimist newspaper Gazette du Midi and dissolving Marseille's Jesuit congregation). Unable to openly oppose the provisional government in Tours, Esquiros sent Crémieux to negotiate with Adolphe Crémieux and Gambetta, but the effort failed.

Esquiros resigned, briefly replaced by Louis-Antoine Delpech, who also resigned. Gambetta then appointed Alphonse Gent. Tensions escalated, fueled by rivalry between the bourgeois National Guard and the working-class Civic Guard created by Esquiros.

On October 3, 1870, the "General Commissioner of the Ligue du Midi for the Defense of the Republic" tasked Crémieux with rallying the region, who declared:

We are resolved to make every sacrifice, and, if we stand alone, we will call for revolution, the relentless and inexorable revolution, with all its hatreds, angers, and patriotic furies. We will march from Marseille armed, preaching holy war along the way.

— Sudhir Hazareesingh, From Subject to Citizen: The Second Empire and the Emergence of Modern French Democracy

On October 19, 1870, Crémieux rallied support for the Ligue du Midi and the Revolutionary Commune at a meeting at the Alhambra. As the Civic Guard was disbanded by the provisional government, Gambetta severed ties with the Ligue. The insurrectional departmental commission then called on Marseillais to take up arms.

On October 31, 1870, the town hall was reoccupied, and the commune was proclaimed. The next day, Gustave Cluseret was appointed commander of the National Guard, Clovis Hugues led the Urban Legion, and Esquiros headed the municipal commission. On November 2, Gent was met with gunfire at Saint-Charles station (Crémieux was absent, attending a meeting in Isère). Esquiros's popularity remained strong, but his son's death from typhoid shifted dynamics. Gambetta, sympathetic personally but not politically, allowed Esquiros to be replaced by Gent.

Gent, bolstered by public sympathy after surviving an attack upon arrival, restored government control. By November 13, he telegraphed Tours that order was restored in Marseille.

=== The start of the commune ===
With peace signed with Germany, the provisional government gave way to legislative elections on February 8, 1871. Esquiros was reelected in Marseille, while Gent resigned, outraged by the armistice terms. The parliament, convening in Bordeaux, was dominated by rural, royalist notables—legitimists and Orléanists

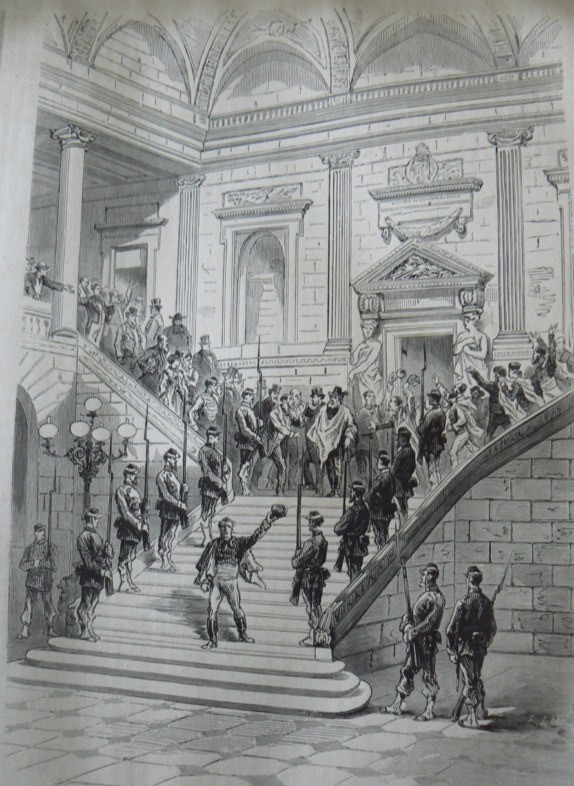
Garibaldi leaving the Grand Théâtre in Bordeaux under a National Guard honor guard.

At Bordeaux, Crémieux, from the public gallery, saluted Garibaldi—elected illegally as an Italian citizen and barred from speaking by royalist deputies—with the famous words:

Rural majority, shame of France!

The gallery crowd applauded, to the dismay of another Marseillais, Adolphe Thiers.

On March 18, 1871, the Paris Commune uprising began. On March 22, news reached Marseille of Thiers, now head of government, threatening to disarm Paris. That day, Crémieux led a third insurrection. He galvanized the radical Eldorado club (republican and socialist) and urged the moderate National Guard club to support Paris, denouncing Versailles. Facing lukewarm support, he returned to rally the Eldorado. Ironically, the Versaillais' missteps triggered the commune's true start.

That evening, the new prefect, Rear-Admiral Paul Cosnier, and General Espivent, ordered the National Guard to rally for Versailles. Mayor Jacques-Thomas Bory tried to dissuade them, but their call failed. A National Guard parade on Cours Belsunce turned into a demonstration involving Garibaldians, Marseillais citizens, and remnants of Esquiros's Civic Guard.

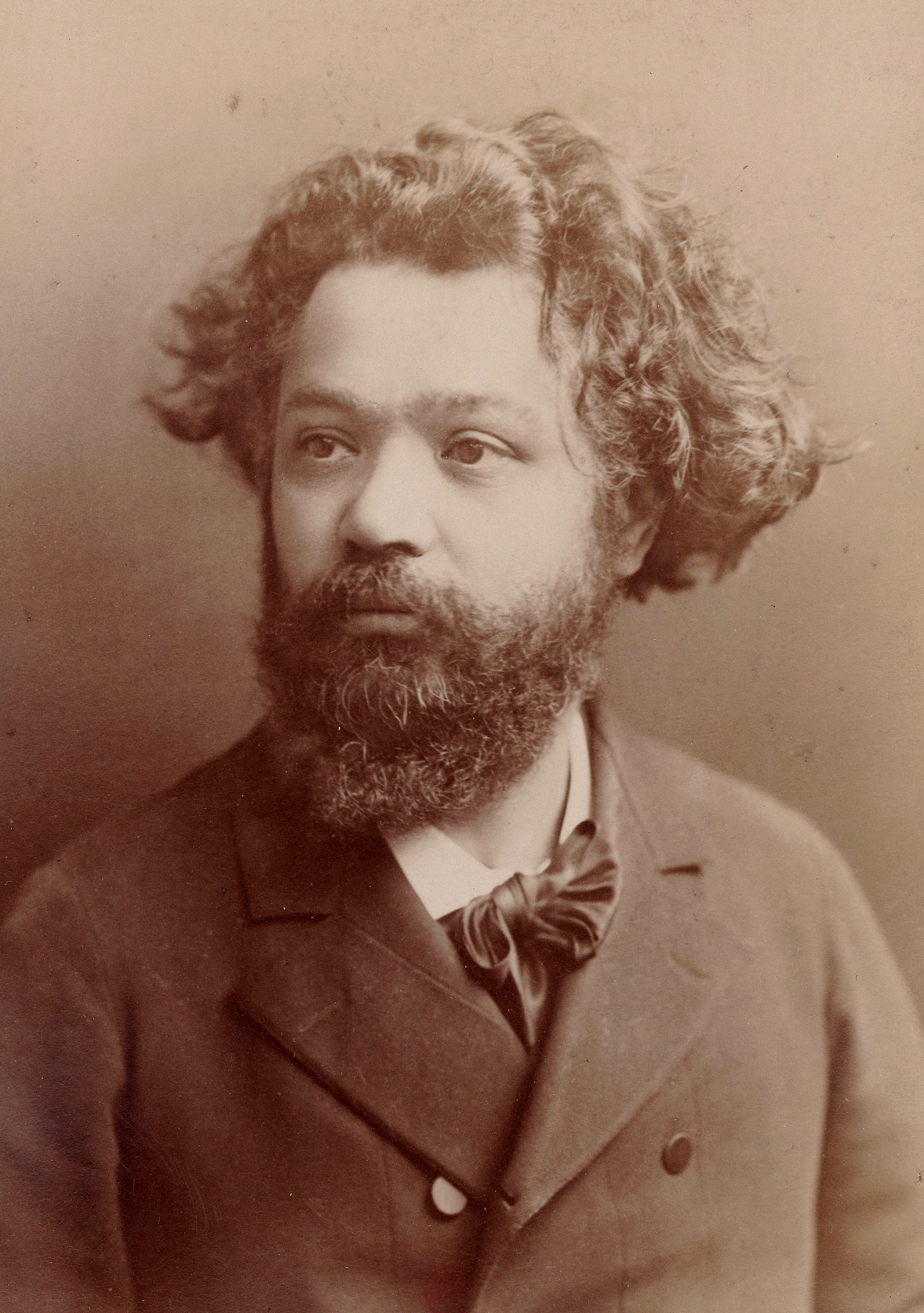
Journalist Clovis Hugues.

The crowd stormed the prefecture without bloodshed. Clovis Hugues, a 20-year-old journalist, marched alongside Crémieux, waving the red flag of the social republic and becoming his right-hand man (later a Boulangist). The Marseille Commune, begun on March 23, lasted until April 5.

=== Avoiding "anarchy" ===
With the prefect imprisoned, the mayor resigned, and Espivent in flight, a 12-member departmental commission, including radicals (Job, Étienne), Internationalists (Alérini), National Guard members (Bouchet, Cartoux), and three municipal council delegates, took over. Crémieux, from the departmental hall balcony, declared Marseille's solidarity with Paris, urged order, and proposed freeing Admiral Cosnier, but the crowd refused.

Alarmed, municipal members tried to withdraw from the commune. Crémieux persuaded Bouchet to stay. On March 27, four Parisian delegates—Landeck, Bernard Landeck, born in Poland in 1832, joined the IWA in 1866. After the commune, he fled to London, associating with Karl Marx. Amouroux, Albert May (Séligman), and Méguy—arrived. Landeck took charge, treating moderates as suspects. Crémieux, arrested, released, and threatened, considered resigning. Communal elections were set for April 6. On March 28, Espivent, having withdrawn his troops to Aubagne, illegally declared Bouches-du-Rhône in a state of war, supporting Thiers's government.

As order was restored in other insurgent cities like Lyon, Toulouse, Saint-Étienne, Limoges, and Narbonne, internal strife peaked in Marseille. The commission (Landeck) dissolved the municipal council (Bouchet) and pushed for the red flag as the commune's emblem. Crémieux proposed the black flag as a symbol of mourning, not anarchism, aiming to maintain legal continuity and avoid disorder. However, administrative leaders—telegraph, judiciary, and police—abandoned their posts, leaving the commune with only proclamations.

=== Suppression ===
On April 3, 1871, Espivent marched 6,000–7,000 troops against Marseille. Fighting began the next day. The railway station held, but Versaillais forces reached barricades on Rue Saint-Ferréol, targeting the prefecture where insurgents were entrenched.

Crémieux attempted to negotiate at Castellane's outposts; two battalions of the 6th Chasseurs fraternized with the crowd. Garibaldians defending the station resisted fiercely. Crémieux believed the commune could triumph. After a brief meeting, Espivent feigned retreat. Some soldiers fraternized (many later executed), but shots from a legitimist club in the Christian Brothers' house killed many insurgents.

By noon, Espivent bombarded the city from Notre-Dame-de-la-Garde, earning the nickname "Notre-Dame de la Bombarde." After over 280 shells, the prefecture fell on April 5 at 7 a.m., after ten hours of fierce fighting. Landeck fled to Paris, Bastélica to Spain, Royannez and Clovis Hugues escaped. Caught between marines, chasseurs, and cannon fire from the hill, with the port under two warships, the city and prefecture fell. The insurgents suffered about 150 deaths and over 500 prisoners; Espivent's forces lost 30 dead and 50 wounded. The next day, troops paraded, shouting "Long live Jesus! Long live the Sacred Heart!"

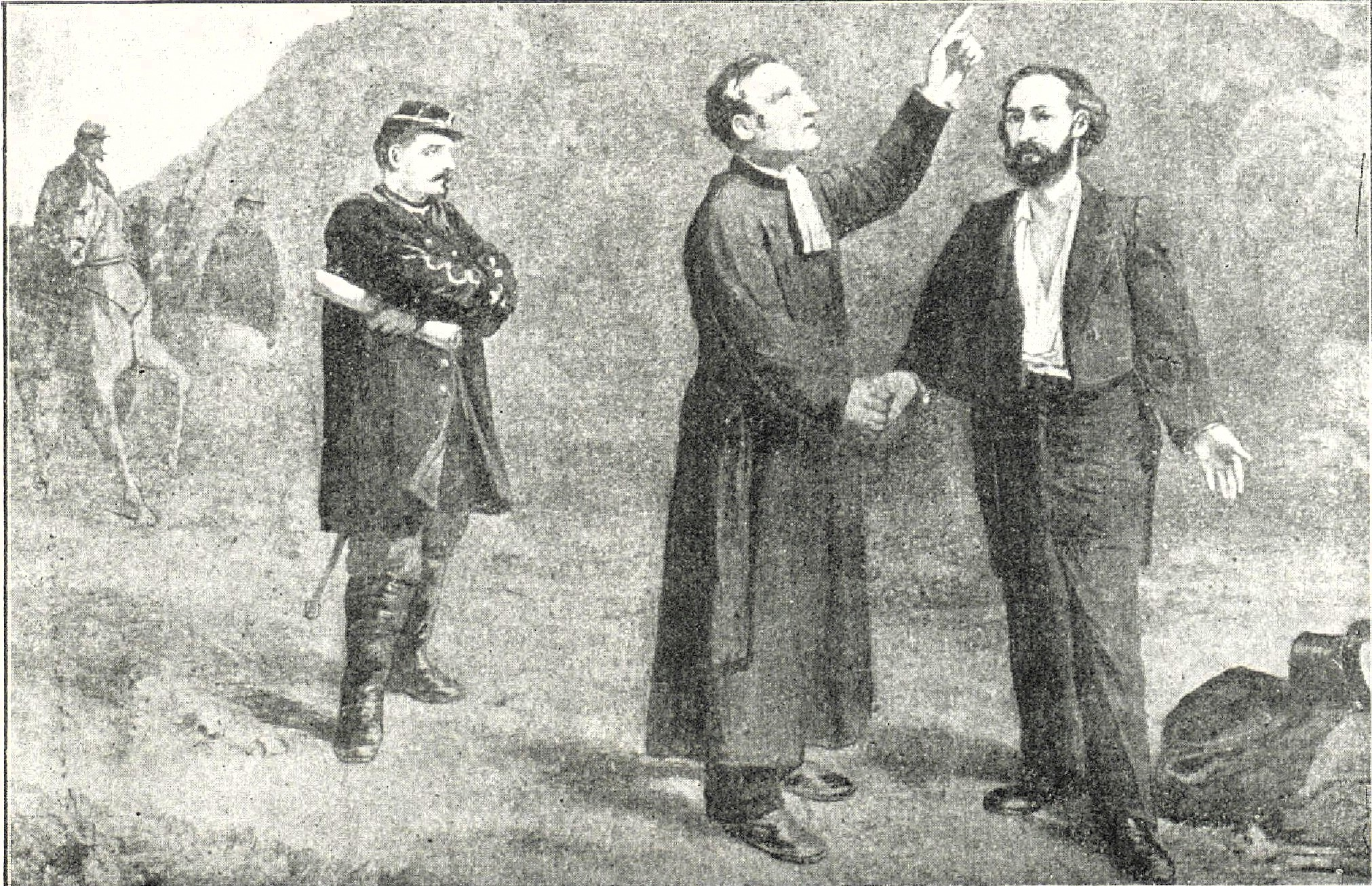
Rabbi Vidal visiting Gaston Crémieux on the day of his execution at the Pharo, November 30, 1871.

Gaston Crémieux refused to flee and was arrested on April 8, 1871, in the Jewish cemetery. His trial began June 12 before a court-martial with other local leaders, mostly moderates: Bouchet, Ducoin, Breton, Pélissier, Duclos, Novi, Nastorg, Hermet, Genetiaux, Chachuat, Éberard, and Matheron. Many were acquitted, but the prosecution sought an example. On June 28, Crémieux, recognized as a political prisoner, was the only one sentenced to death. Clovis Hugues was captured four months later. The Court of Cassation upheld the verdicts on September 15.

Adolphe Thiers, now president, advocated for clemency for Étienne and Pélissier. He delayed Crémieux's file for four days, but the pardon commission, pressured by Espivent, upheld the sentence.

Crémieux was executed at the Pharo on November 30, 1871; Clovis Hugues received four years in prison and a 6,000-franc fine. With government authority restored, clubs were closed, the National Guard disarmed and disbanded, and censorship reinstated, ushering in five years of "Moral Order."

== See also ==
- Gaston Crémieux
- Clovis Hugues
- Paris Commune
- French Third Republic
- Government of National Defense
- Léon Gambetta
- Blanquism
- International Workingmen's Association

== Bibliography ==
- Aubray, Maxime; Michelesi, Sylla (1872). Histoire des évènements de Marseille du 4 septembre 1870 au 4 avril 1871 [History of the events in Marseille from September 4, 1870, to April 4, 1871] (in French). Marseille: T. Samat. p. 394. OCLC 457049692.
- Crémieux, Gaston (1879). Œuvres posthumes, précédées d'une lettre de Victor Hugo et d'une notice par Alfred Naquet [Posthumous works, preceded by a letter from Victor Hugo and a note by Alfred Naquet] (in French). Paris: Édouard Dentu, Librairie de la Société des Gens de Lettres. OCLC 457049692.
- Lissagaray, Prosper-Olivier (1929). Histoire de la Commune de 1871 [History of the Commune of 1871] (in French). Paris: Librairie du Travail. OCLC 123456789.
- Lepelletier, Edmond (1871). Histoire de la commune de Paris [History of the Paris Commune] (PDF) (in French). OCLC 987654321. Archived from the original (PDF) on March 3, 2016.
- Dubreuilh, Louis (1871). Jaurès, Jean (ed.). La Commune [The Commune] (in French). p. 294.
- Camous, Claude (2009). La Commune à Marseille [The Commune in Marseille] (in French). Preface by Jean Contrucci. Gémenos: Autres Temps. ISBN 978-2-84521-377-7.
- Leidet, Gérard; Drogoz, Colette (2013). 1870-1871, Autour de la Commune de Marseille: Aspects du mouvement communaliste dans le Midi [1870-1871, Around the Marseille Commune: Aspects of the Communalist Movement in the South]. Collection Promémo (in French). Postface by Jacques Rougerie. Paris: Éditions Syllepse. ISBN 978-2-84950-388-1.
- Ricker, Achille; Faucher, Jean-André (1967). Histoire de la franc-maçonnerie en France [History of Freemasonry in France] (in French). Paris: Nouvelles Éditions Latines. ISBN 978-2-7233-0063-6.
- Vignaud, Roger (2003). Gaston Crémieux: La Commune de Marseille, un rêve inachevé [Gaston Crémieux: The Marseille Commune, An Unfinished Dream] (in French). Aix-en-Provence: Édisud. ISBN 978-2-7449-0387-8.
