= Lyon Commune =

1870–1871 revolutionary movement in Lyon, France

Commune de Lyon
- 1870–1871
- Flag

- Location of Lyon in France
- Capital: Lyon
- Government: Committee of Public Safety (Lyon)
  - Type: Local revolutionary provisional government
- History
  - Established: 4 September 1870
  - Salvation Committee established: 17 September 1870
  - Second uprising begins: 22 March 1871
  - Disestablished: 1 May 1871
Preceded by	Succeeded by
Second French Empire	French Third Republic

The Lyon Commune (French: Commune de Lyon) was a short-lived revolutionary movement in Lyon, France, in 1870–1871. Republicans and activists from several components of the far-left of the time seized power in Lyon and established an autonomous government. The commune organized elections, but dissolved after the restoration of a republican "normality", which frustrated the most radical elements, who hoped for a different revolution. Radicals twice tried to regain power, without success.

The Lyon events happened in the context of a revolutionary wave of series of similar uprisings in most major French cities in the aftermath of the collapse of the Second French Empire, culminating in the 1871 Paris Commune.

== Beginnings of the revolutionary movement and preparation for the seizure of power ==
From the first months of 1870, the Lyon members of the International Workingmen's Association (IWA) worked to prepare the workers of Lyon for a possible revolution. In liaison with Mikhail Bakunin, they organized a big meeting bringing together several thousand participants on March 13, which gave great weight to the local section, then re-elected with Albert Richard at its head. On July 20, 1870, on the second day of the Franco-Prussian War, the IWA organized a peaceful demonstration in place des Terreaux to rue Sala.

During the conflict, throughout the city the republican and more radical elements (anarchists, revolutionary socialists) prepared for the fall of the Second French Empire. The different sensibilities tried to come together to organize the aftermath of Napoleon III but they did not manage to get along. However, all these circles agreed on the idea of municipal autonomy, to break with the centralizing practices of the Empire.

The news of the defeat at Sedan and the capture of the emperor, brought by travelers coming from Geneva, spread slowly. Among the activists who learned about it and who were preparing for the seizure of power, a group of radical tendencies which called itself the "committee of the nine" quickly made a list of approximately seventy names intended to form the first organ of power which would take the place of official authorities the next day. This group was made up of members of the left wing of the radical party, Blanquists for the most part. The majority of people on this list would effectively form the Committee of Public Safety.

== The events of September 4: the seizure of power ==
=== The seizure of power and the proclamation of the Republic ===
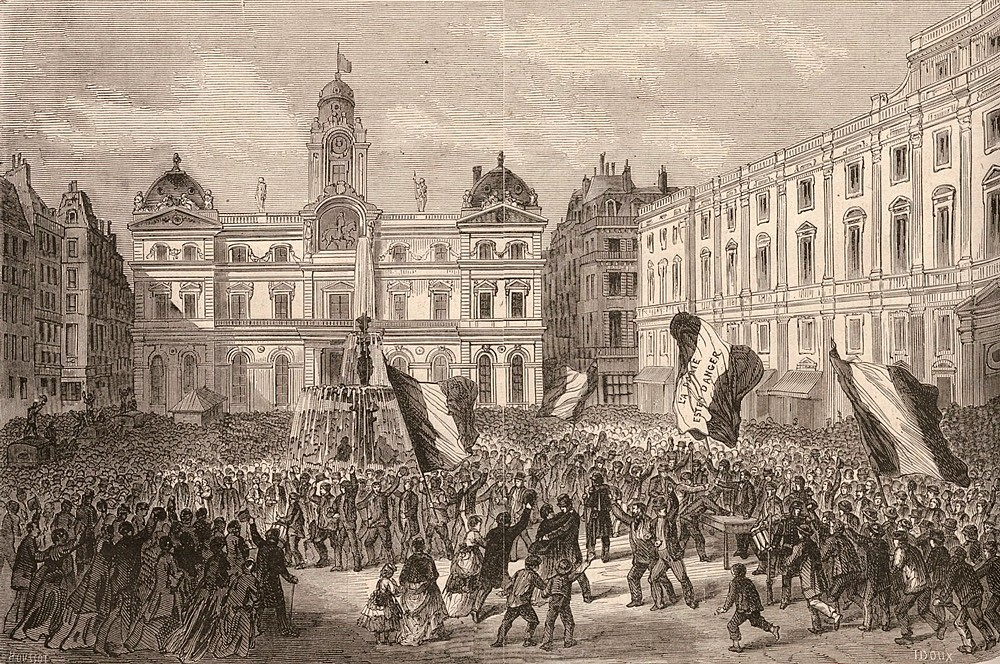
Storming of the city hall and proclamation of the Republic.

From eight o'clock in the morning, the crowd gathered without a real slogan on the forecourt of the town hall. Without encountering resistance, it seized power under the leadership of a few leaders who had quickly arrived: Jacques-Louis Hénon, Désiré Barodet, Doctor Durand. Without delay, they proclaimed the French Third Republic on the balcony, in a radical but not revolutionary spirit, and put up a poster in town decreeing the downfall of the Empire. Members of the International Workingmen's Association (IWA) participated in the uprising, and the red flag was raised in place of the tricolor, without it being clearly defined whether this symbol announced a future revolution or simply proclaimed the downfall of the previous regime. Among the members announcing the Republic, there was Charles Beauvoir, member of the IWA.

=== The organization of power ===
Immediately, a committee of public safety made up of Republicans and some militants of the International was organized. This group of sixty-seven was elected by acclamation from the balconies of the town hall. They were called by the members of the committee of nine. The majority of committee members come from working-class backgrounds; including Louis Andrieux, then released from Prison Saint-Paul. Out of the totality, only ten were members of the IWA, the patriotism of the majority of the creators of the committee rejecting many of them.

The same day, the commune of la Guillotière experienced an uprising and the establishment of a commune with the red flag.

=== The governor's attempt to take over power ===
General Henri Espivent de La Villesboisnet left his troops in town and ordered them to disperse the revolutionaries. The men of the rank refused to fight, leaving their sabers in their scabbards and mounting the butts of their rifles. In order not to see his lines disperse, and the weapons get lost in the crowd, the general quickly made them return to the barracks, leaving the public safety committee in place.

On the same day, the National Guards of the working-class neighborhoods, to whom no weapons had been entrusted, stormed the Lamothe and La Vitriolerie forts and seized weapons.

== The Lyon Commune in place ==
On September 6, Paul-Armand Challemel-Lacour, who had been appointed prefect of the Rhône by the Government of National Defense, arrived in Lyon. On September 8, ten commissioners were appointed to act as “intermediaries for the people of Lyon with the Committee for Public Safety”. Albert Richard, Louis Andrieux and Victor Jaclard, who were part of it, were delegates to the Parisian government to discuss with it the levy en masse against the Prussians. Andrieux, whose only wish was the return of order, returned from Paris with the title of public prosecutor in Lyon. Albert Richard, meanwhile, returned with Gustave Paul Cluseret who was to be appointed commander of the Rhône volunteers and the corps of snipers from the South.

Mikhail Bakunin arrived in Lyon on September 14 or 15 with Vladimir Ozerov, Walenty Lankiewicz and F. Bischoff. He was alarmed to see the Lyon section of the IWA collaborating with the Republicans, and instead pushed them to foment a revolutionary war, against the Prussians, and at the cost of the overthrow of the provisional government, which he denounced as defeatist.

On the same day, the public safety committee dissolved to make way for the authorities elected in the municipal elections that it organized. Hénon then became the first mayor of Lyon.

== The Salvation Committee of France ==
On September 17, 1870, during a public meeting, the militants of the IWA, including Bakunin, founded the Salvation Committee of France, on a program of mass levy and revolutionary war, in the spirit of 1792-1793. Camille Camet was its secretary, and its main figures were Albert Richard, Gustave Paul Cluseret, Charles Beauvoir, Mikhail Bakunin, Eugène Saignes and Louis Palix.

The Salvation Committee of France, which included delegates from different parts of the city, was very active, publishing manifestos and increasing the number of public meetings. Coordination was soon established between revolutionary groups, workers' associations and citizen militias, and the plan for an insurrection in Lyon was put in place.

In Lyon, on September 26, 1870, Salle de la Rotonde, at Les Brotteaux, during a big meeting with the workers in struggle of the national sites, the Salvation Committee of France called for the replacement of the provisional government by a decentralized and fighting federation of municipalities. The next day was spent preparing and writing a short program, which was printed on a red poster. This was put up on the morning of September 28, the day chosen for the uprising.

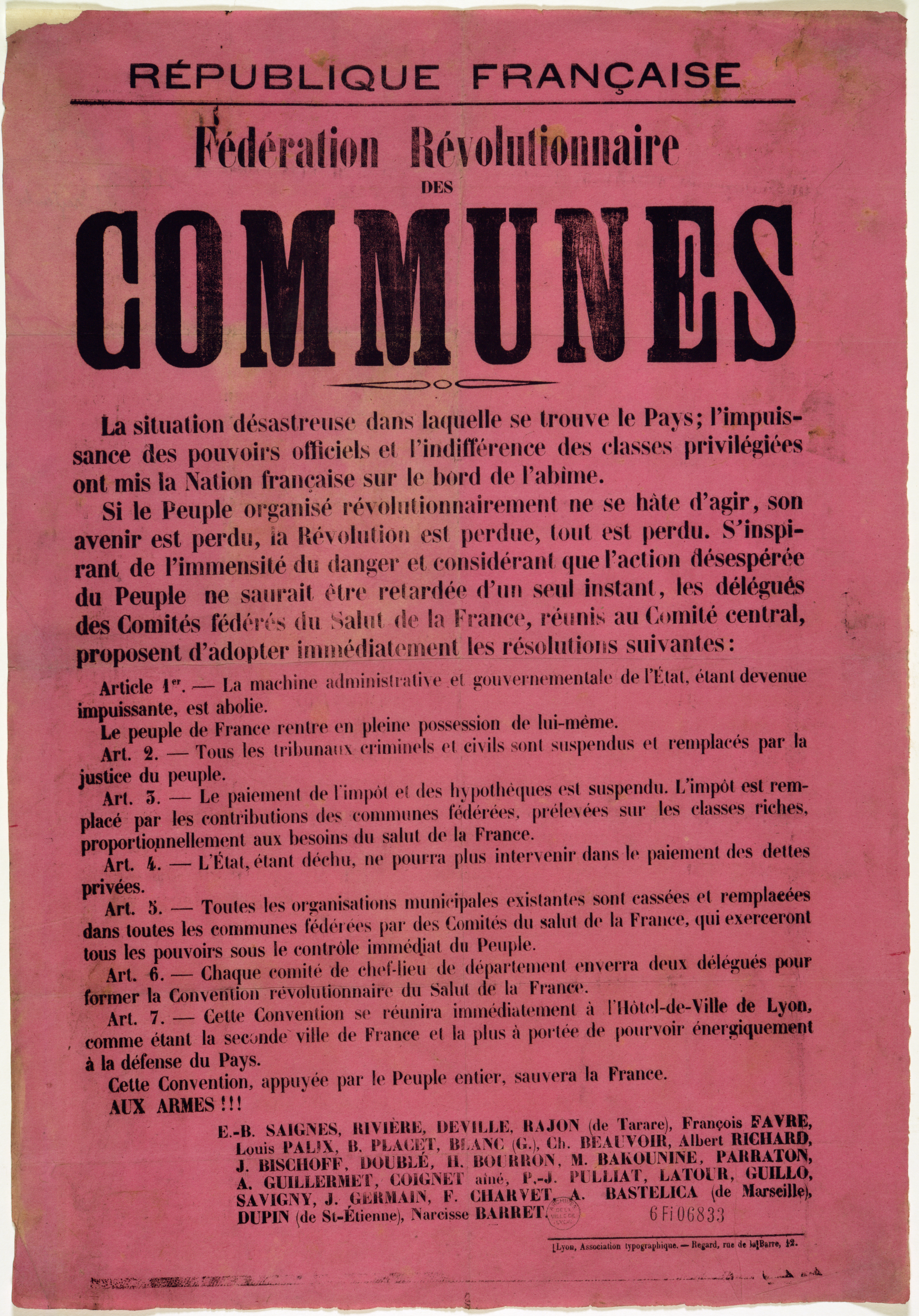
Poster of the first Municipality of Lyon, kept at the Municipal Archives of Lyon, ref. 6fi 6833

The disastrous situation in which the Country finds itself; the impotence of official powers and the indifference of the privileged classes have brought the French nation to the brink of the abyss.

If the revolutionary organized people do not hasten to act, their future is lost, the revolution is lost, all is lost. Inspired by the immensity of the danger and considering that the desperate action of the people could not be delayed for a single moment, the delegates of the federated committees for the salvation of France, meeting at the Central Committee, propose to immediately adopt the following resolutions:

Article 1. - The state's administrative and governmental machine, having become powerless, is abolished.
The people of France are coming back in full possession of themselves.
Art. 2. - All criminal and civil courts are suspended and replaced by popular justice.
Art. 3. - Payment of taxes and mortgages is suspended. The tax is replaced by contributions from federated municipalities, levied on the wealthy classes, in proportion to the needs of France's salvation.
Art. 4. - The state having fallen, will no longer be able to intervene in the payment of private debts.
Art. 5. - All the existing municipal organizations are broken and replaced in all the federated municipalities by committees for the salvation of France, which will exercise all the powers under the immediate control of the People.
Art. 6. - Each departmental chief town committee will send two delegates to form the revolutionary convention for the Salvation of France.
Art. 7. - This convention will meet immediately at the Town Hall of Lyon, as being the second city in France and the most within reach to provide energetically for the defense of the country.

This convention supported by the whole people will save France.

Aux Armes !!!

— The 26 signatories of this convention of the Revolutionary Federation of Communes and mentioned on the red poster, are in particular: Albert Richard, Michel Bakounine, Gustave Blanc, Eugène-Bertrand Saignes, Louis Palix (Lyon), Rajon (Tarare), A. Bastellica (Marseille), Dupin (St Étienne)

At the call of teams of agitators sent to the construction sites, a demonstration of several thousand workers displaying the red flag invaded the Place des Terreaux at noon. About a hundred activists from the Salvation Committee of France - including Bakunin, Saignes, Bastelica and Albert Richard - then entered the town hall.

From the top of the balcony, Saignes reads the manifesto again to the applause of the crowd. The mayor and the prefect Challemel-Lacour were held captive. Gustave Paul Cluseret went to la Croix-Rousse but failed to mobilize the working population and the national guard of the district there. Bakunin later attributed the failure of the movement to this "treason" by Cluseret: the workers gathered on the Place des Terreaux were in fact disarmed in the face of the troops and the national guard of the bourgeois neighborhoods. Surrounded by the town hall, and while the hoped-for uprising did not take place, the revolutionaries ended up negotiating the evacuation. Shortly after, when the prefectural power was restored and the repression began, Bakunin was forced to flee to Marseille.

== Second uprising ==
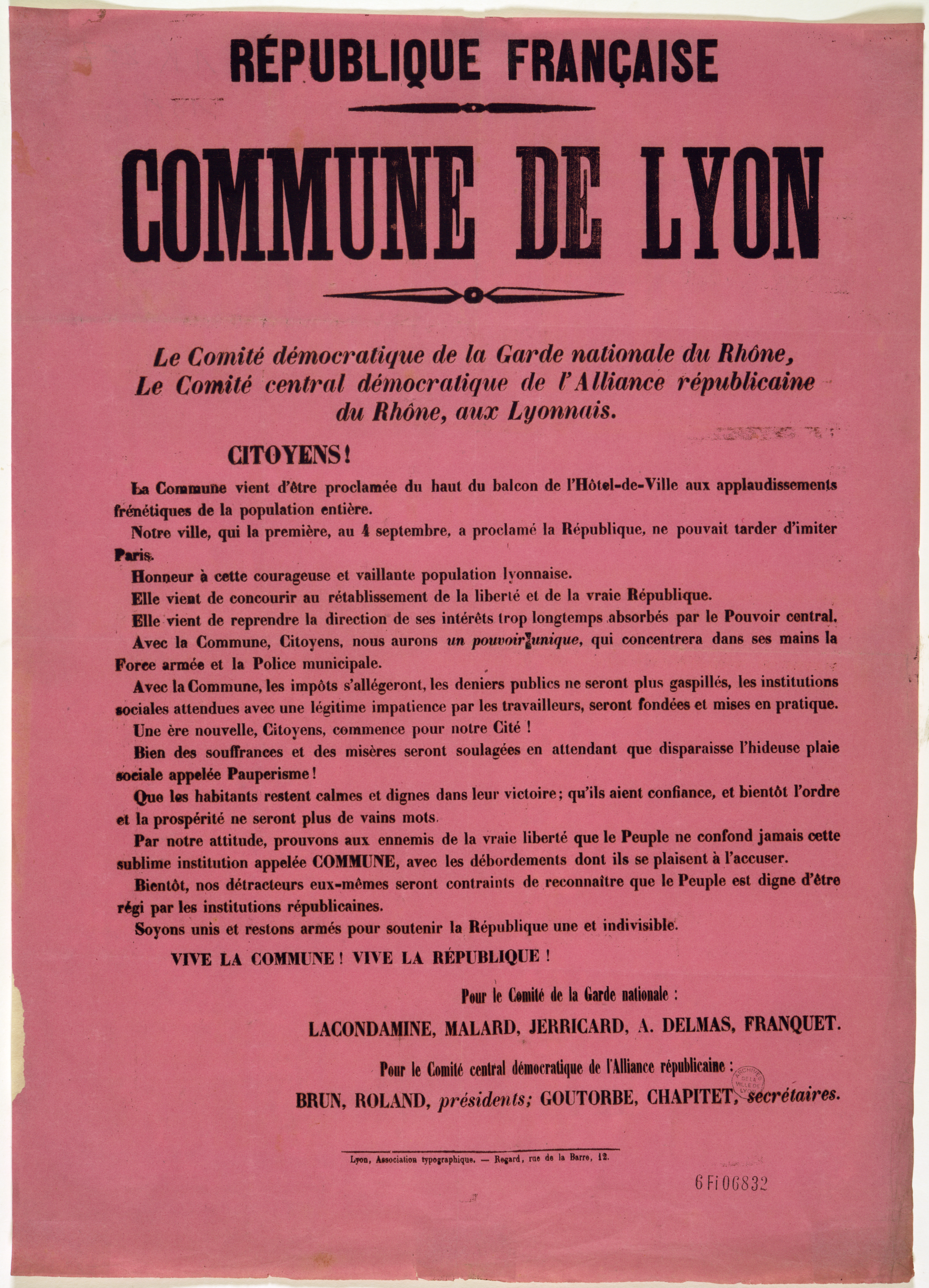
Poster proclaiming the Second Lyon Commune on March 23, 1871, kept at the Municipal Archives of Lyon, ref. 6fi 6832

In the spring 1871, many unknown Lyonnais militants and almost anonymous insurgents launched short insurrections, which took place in two stages. From March 22 to 25, 1871, the scene at the Town Hall, while that of April 30 and May 1, 1871, were more bloody, took place in the suburb of la Guillotière.

=== The Town Hall ===
During the night of March 22 to 23, the Town Hall was once again invaded with the help of actors from September 28, 1870, members of the former Committee of Public Safety, of the Revolutionary Committee of la Guillotière, and 18 battalions out of 24 of the Central Committee of the National Guard. A commission is installed.

On March 25, however, in a subtle attempt to counter the Lyon Commune, Jacques-Louis Hénon, the first mayor of Lyon of the Third Republic, had posters posted announcing the solemn reception of the heroes in arms of Belfort who had resisted the siege of the Prussians. The entry of this intervention force put an end to this insurrection.

=== La Guillotière ===
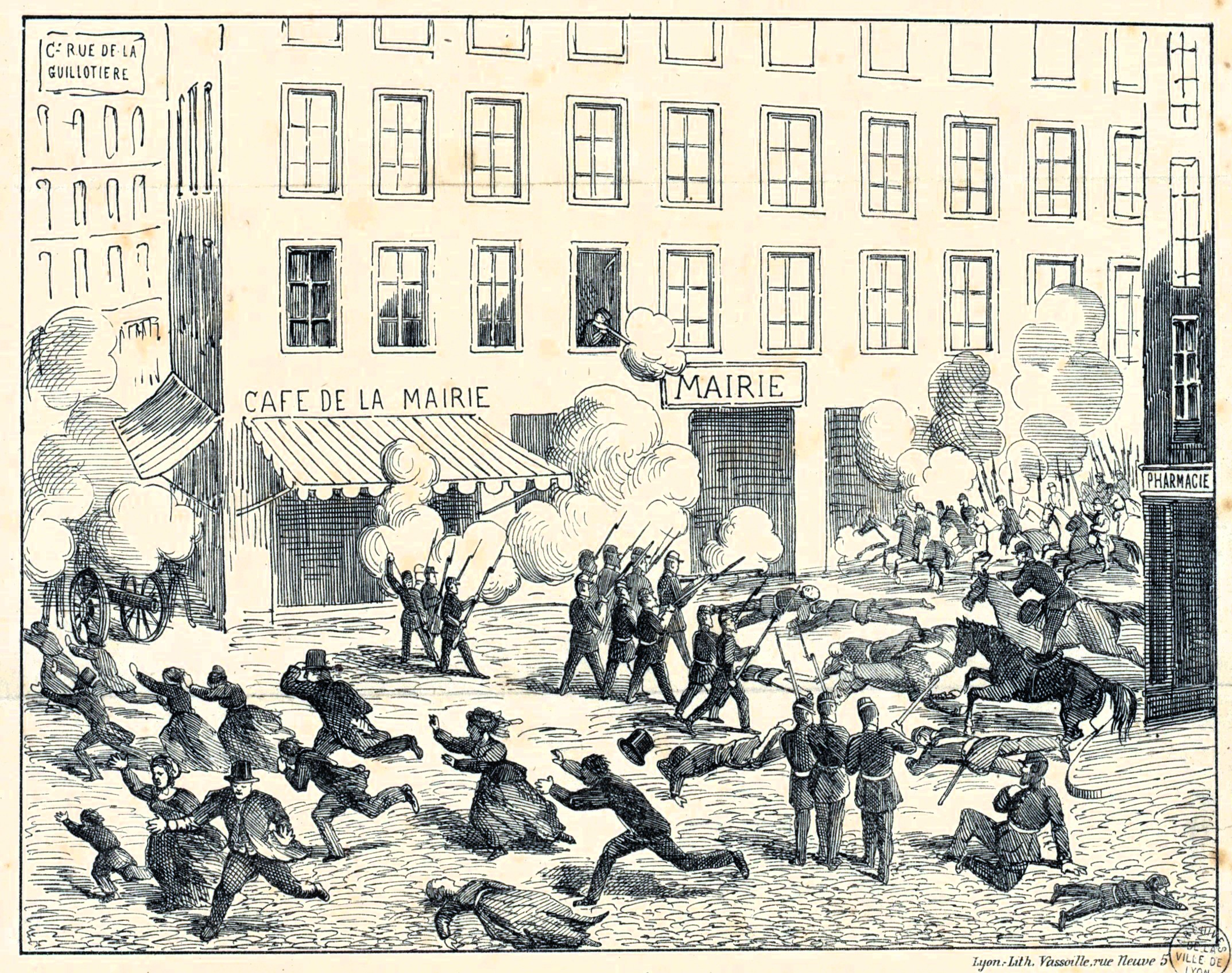
Final fighting around the town hall of La Guillotière on April 30.

However, the red flag continued to fly over the town hall of la Guillotière, place du Pont. On April 30, after a call to boycott the elections, it was occupied by the national guards who forbade access to the polls with the complicity of the majority of the population. Barricades were erected on Grand rue de la Guillotière and cours des Brosses. The army arrived from Perrache, on the orders of prefect Marie-Edmond Valentin, facing a crowd of 20,000 to 25,000 people shouting "Don't shoot! Stick in the air! You are being made to march against the people!" It was then that two columns of infantry, one by the Pont de la Guillotière with Valentin and the other by the rue de Marseille with Andrieux, dispersed the demonstrators around 7.45 p.m. by firing. The insurgents retaliated from behind the barricades and the battle lasted until 11 p.m., when the soldiers called in the artillery to break down the doors of the town hall of la Guillotière. There were around thirty dead. Agent Jacques François Griscelli appeared to have played a role in this episode by defeating the "Geneva plot".

In Croix-Rousse, a barricade was erected on rue de Cuire, but, devoid of defenders, it was destroyed on April 30 at around 1:30 pm. On the other hand, the barricades on the Grand rue de la Guillotière held out until 11:20 am on May 1, when there were many wounded and at least 13 dead. La Guillotière now embodied the worker district and thus replaced the insurrectionary slopes of Croix-Rousse.

== See also ==
- Besançon Commune
- Le Creusot Commune

== Bibliography ==
- Archer, Julian P. W. (1971a). The First International and the Lyon revolutionary movement, 1864–1871 (Ph.D.). University of Wisconsin – Madison. OCLC 3633738.
- Archer, Julian (October 1971). "La Commune de Lyon (mars–avril 1871)" [The Commune of Lyon (March–April 1871)]. Le Mouvement Social (in French) (77): 5–47. doi:10.2307/3807010. ISSN 0027-2671. JSTOR 3807010.
- Archer, Julian P. W. (April 1972). "The Crowd in the Lyon Commune and the Insurrection of La Guillotiere". International Review of Social History. 17 (1): 183–188. doi:10.1017/S0020859000006489. ISSN 0020-8590. JSTOR 44594905.
- Avrich, Paul (1988). "Paris Commune". Anarchist Portraits. Princeton, New Jersey: Princeton University Press. ISBN 0-691-04753-7. OCLC 17727270.
- Grawitz, Madeleine (1990). Michel Bakounine (in French). Plon. p. 452. ISBN 2259022340.
- Greenberg, Louis M (1971). Sisters of Liberty: Marseille, Lyon, Paris, and the Reaction to a Centralized State, 1868–1871. Cambridge, Mass.: Harvard University Press. ISBN 978-0-674-81000-6. OCLC 132664.
- Lequin, Yves (1977). Les Ouvriers de la region lyonnaise, 1848–1914 [Workers in the Lyon region, 1848–1914] (in French). Lyon: Presses Universitaires de Lyon. ISBN 978-2-7297-0004-1. OCLC 805646040.
- Moissonnier, Maurice (1972). La premiere internationale et la commune a Lyon (1865–1871) [The international premiere and the commune in Lyon (1865–1871)] (in French). Paris: Editions sociales. OCLC 902707001.
- Moissonnier, Maurice (April 1972). "La Province et la Commune" [The Province and the Commune]. International Review of Social History (in French). 17 (1): 151–182. doi:10.1017/S0020859000006477. ISSN 0020-8590. JSTOR 44594904.
- Rabbe, Matthieu (2015). Les communards à Lyon: les insurgés, la répression, la surveillance [Communards in Lyon: insurgents, repression, surveillance] (in French). Lyon: Atelier de création libertaire. ISBN 978-2-35104-087-4.
- Riviale, Philippe (2003). Sur la commune cerises de sang [On the common blood cherries] (in French). Paris: L'Harmattan. p. 96. ISBN 9782747552905. OCLC 470462597.
