= Le Creusot Commune =

1871 insurrectionary commune in France

- Formation: March 26, 1871
- Dissolved: March 28, 1871
- Type: Insurrectionary commune
- Purpose: Communalism
- Location: France
- Key people: Jean-Baptiste Dumay

Le Creusot Commune was a brief insurrectionary commune proclaimed in Le Creusot in March 1871.

== History ==
=== Situation in Creusot after the fall of the Empire ===
On September 4, 1870, the fall of the Empire led Eugène Schneider, president of the Legislative Body under the deposed regime and mayor of Le Creusot, to go into exile in England. In the town, democrats and conservatives clashed over the vacant local power. The former held numerous public meetings and led a National Defense committee, where the fight against the Prussians was organized according to the directives of Léon Gambetta, Minister of the Interior in the provisional government.

On September 24, under popular pressure, Jean-Baptiste Dumay, chairman of the National Defense Committee, was appointed provisional mayor of Le Creusot by the new prefect. The new mayor organized supplies for the armies of the Centre region fighting near Dijon, protecting Le Creusot, and formed a Working National Guard in his town.

However, the Municipal Council, a mere product of Schneider's staff, remained in place: indeed, a delegation from the company convinced the Minister of the Interior that only its continuation could preserve arms production in the face of revolutionary unrest. The few social measures proposed by the new mayor were systematically rejected by the company's management.

In 1871, Jean-Baptiste Dumay requested and obtained from Giuseppe Garibaldi, before he left Dijon, some 4,000 rifles and as many kilograms of ammunition enabling him to equip the National Guard. In the legislative elections of February 8, the Gambettist Republican list, led by Garibaldi, won 77% of the votes in Le Creusot, but the Conservative list, massively supported by the peasants votes, won in the rest of the department.

On February 26, unrest broke out in the city. The government of Adolphe Thiers sent in troops. On March 12, the Commissaire de police was dismissed and replaced by his predecessor appointed under the Empire: the mayor protested vigorously to the Ministry of the Interior and obtained the annulment of the appointment.

=== Insurrection development ===
On March 19, 1871, Jean-Baptiste Dumay gave a speech to workers at a file factory in Arnay-le-Duc, where he learned of the Paris uprising the previous day against Thiers' government. The following day, the Republican-Socialist Committee of Le Creusot decided to hold a review of the National Guard and a demonstration in support of the Parisian movement on March 26.

On March 25, Albert Leblanc, sent to the provinces by the Central Committee of the Paris National Guard, called on the people of Creusot to proclaim the Commune, following the example of Paris, Lyon and Saint-Étienne. With his help, Dumay carefully prepared the proclamation for the next day's rally.

On March 26, in the square in front of the town hall (now Square Schneider), the confrontation between the national guards and the line soldiers turned into a fraternization, with cries of "Long live the Republic", with the colonel withdrawing his troops. From a window on the second floor of the town hall, on which the red flag was hoisted, Jean-Baptiste Dumay proclaimed: "I am no longer the representative of the Versailles Government, I am the representative of the Commune of Le Creusot".

During the night, he sent the National Guards to occupy the station, the telegraph and the post office, only to find the three establishments already held by the troops. On the morning of March 27, the prefect, the public prosecutor and a thousand soldiers arrived by train. Meetings were banned and arrest warrants were issued for the leaders of the movement. Demonstrations in support of Dumay and the Commune were dispersed.

However, the proclamation was repeated several times, and the red flag was once again raised. But on March 28, order was finally restored. Most of the leaders of the Republican-Socialist Committee managed to reach Geneva; others were imprisoned. Dumay, himself taken prisoner, escaped and remained hidden in Le Creusot. At the end of April, the Prefect ordered the disarmament of the National Guard. 700 rifles and 20,000 rounds of ammunition were seized, but many workers kept their weapons.

=== Consequences ===
The municipal election of April 30 saw Jean-Baptiste Dumay, still in hiding, opposing Henri Schneider. Dumay's list came within sixteen votes of passing in the first round. But around a hundred workers were opportunely dismissed before the second ballot, and on May 10, all the Schneider candidates were elected. Henri Schneider remained mayor for 25 years.

On June 28 and 29, the Chalon Assize Court judged twenty-two Creusot residents on charges of inciting civil war: it acquitted the thirteen defendants present, but Dumay, exiled in Switzerland, was sentenced in absentia on September 9 to hard labor for life. Returning to France in 1880, he joined the possibilist movement and was elected Paris Municipal Councillor (1887–1890), then deputy for the Seine (1889–1893). After losing the 1893 legislative elections in Saint-Étienne, where he had stood as an independent socialist, he withdrew from the political scene. After retiring to Chelles, he became the leader of the local SFIO.

== See also ==
- Le Creusot
- Jean-Baptiste Dumay
- Labour movement
- Paris Commune
- Lyon Commune
