= Désiré Barodet =

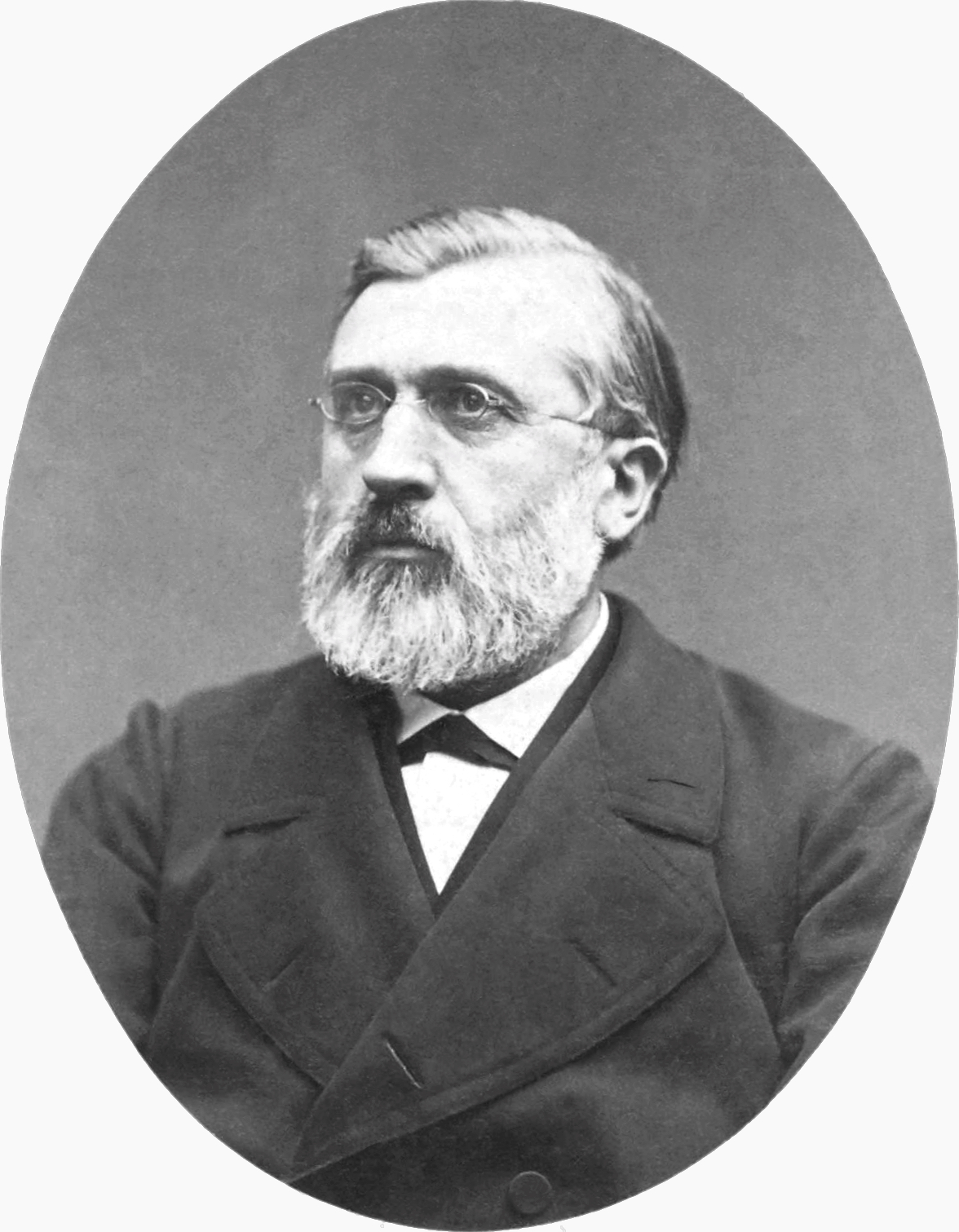
Portrait of Désiré Barodet by Carjat

Claude-Désiré Barodet (27 July 1823 – 28 April 1906) was a French Radical Republican politician.

== Biography ==
The son of a teacher, Barodet studied at a minor seminary; however he later changed his profession and trained to become a teacher.

He was inspired of the new ideas brought about by the 1848 Revolutions. He was summoned by Minister Falloux for republican propaganda, but dismissed because of his radical views. He then became a free teacher at Cuisery. After the 1851 coup d'état, he joined Lyon where he campaigned alongside the Republicans. He became a merchant there and joined Freemasonry. He also attended a republican club, the Cercle de la Ruche where he met Jacques-Louis Hénon.

After the fall of the Empire in 1870 and later the suppression of the Lyon Commune (which he took part in), he was one of the leaders of the local radical party and was appointed Mayor of Lyon in 1871 by Adolphe Thiers at the request of the Conseil municipal. He had to resign this office when the National Assembly, by a special law of 4 April 1873, abolished the central mairie of Lyon and subordinated the municipal authorities to the government because of their radical tendencies.

The Radical party then nominated him as their candidate in a by-election in Paris against moderate Republican Charles de Rémusat, and Barodet won a victory on 27 April that saw Thiers overthrown as the legitimists in the Assembly used him as an occasion taken to give Thiers a vote of no confidence.

At the beginning of the Third Republic, Barodet joined the extreme left in the National Assembly, the Republican Left in the Chamber of Deputies and was one of the leaders of the Radicals.

In 1877, he was the author of the first bill on free, compulsory and secular primary education, taken up by Jules Ferry in 1882. That same year (1877) he was one of the signatories of the manifesto of 363. On 11 November 1881, he proposed the principle of the publication of the electoral programs and commitments of deputies so that each citizen could check whether the commitments are kept; this work called "the Barodet" is still topical in the National Assembly.

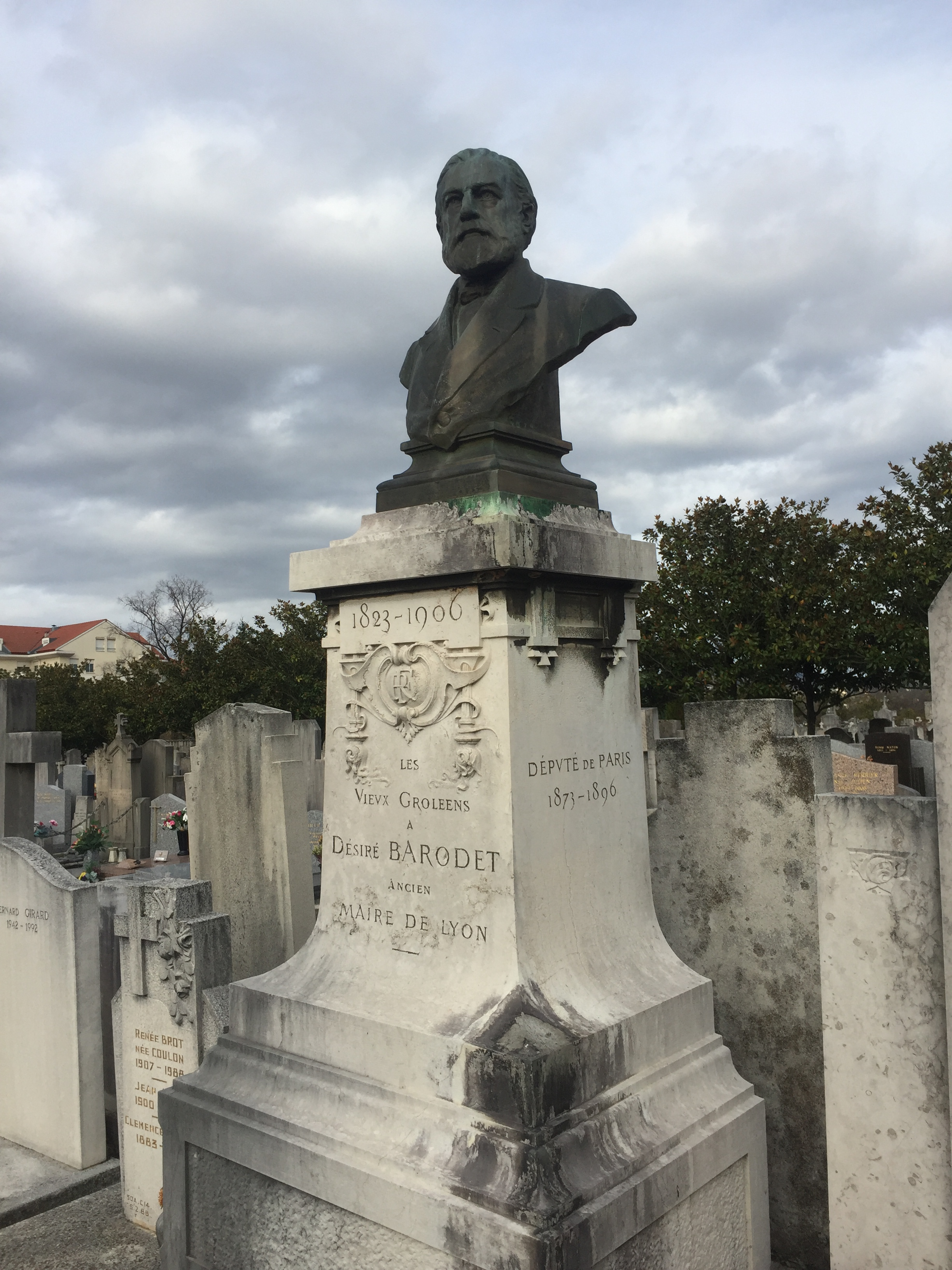
Barodet's tombstone at the Cemetery of Croix-Rousse

In 1896, he left the Chamber of Deputies for the Senate, where he remained until 1900.
