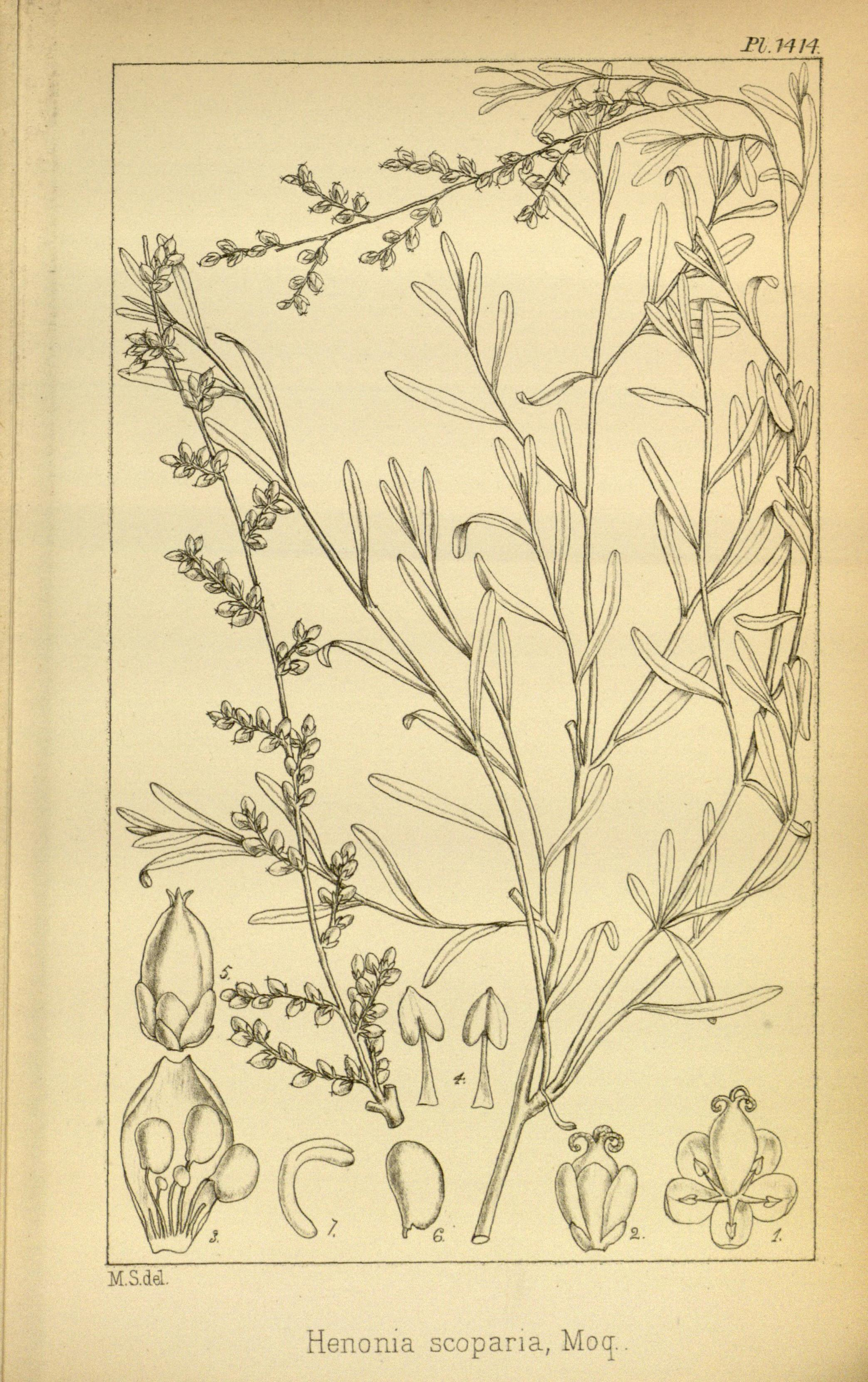

Conservation status
- Endangered (IUCN 3.1)

Scientific classification
- Kingdom: Plantae
- Clade: Tracheophytes
- Clade: Angiosperms
- Clade: Eudicots
- Order: Caryophyllales
- Family: Amaranthaceae
- Subfamily: Amaranthoideae
- Genus: Henonia; Moq.
- Species: H. scoparia

Binomial name
- Henonia scoparia Moq.

= Henonia =

Genus of plants

Henonia is a monotypic genus of flowering plants belonging to the family Amaranthaceae. It only contains one species, Henonia scoparia.

It is native to Madagascar, where it is known as kifafalahy.

== Description ==
Henonia scoparia is a shrub or small tree which grows from 1 to 2.5 meters tall. Flowers appear in March, and it fruits starting in November.

== Range and habitat ==
Henonia scoparia is endemic to southwestern Madagascar, in former Toliara Province. It is known from four herbarium specimens, with three known locations. Based on these collections, the species' estimated extent of occurrence (EOO) is 7,150 km^{2}, and its area of occupancy (AOO) is 16 km^{2}.

It is found in dry forest, bushland, dunes, and thickets in the Madagascar succulent woodlands and Madagascar spiny thickets ecoregions, between 100 and 520 meters elevation.

Little is known about the population size of the species. The species' native habitat is threatened with degradation by human activity.

== Name ==
The genus name of Henonia is in honour of Jacques-Louis Hénon (1802–1872), a French republican politician. The Latin specific epithet of scoparia refers to broom, from scopae. It was first described and published in (A.P.de Candolle), Prodr. Vol.13 (Issue 2) on page 237 in 1849.
