= Henoonia =

Scientific classification
- Kingdom: Plantae
- Clade: Tracheophytes
- Clade: Angiosperms
- Clade: Eudicots
- Clade: Asterids
- Order: Solanales
- Family: Solanaceae
- Genus: Henoonia; Griseb.
- Species: H. myrtifolia

Binomial name
- Henoonia myrtifolia Griseb.

Synonyms
- Castela brittonii (Small) Engl.; Castelaria brittonii Small; Bissea myrtifolia (Griseb.) V.R.Fuentes; Henoonia angustifolia Urb.; Henoonia brittonii (Small) Monach.

Genus of plants

Henoonia is a monotypic genus of flowering plants belonging to the family Solanaceae. The only species is Henoonia myrtifolia. It is native to Cuba. It is a stiff bush, with a whitish bark, red-pubescent branches, alternate papery leaves of 3.0-3.8 cm long and 1.0-1.3 cm wide that grow from thickened nodes, with a very short leafstalk, shortly spade-shaped to oblong, the tip sharp or pointed, margin entire, veined, glabrous above, initially with soft rufous felty hair below but becoming glabrous with age except near the main vein. The rufous, velvety calyx of 2.5 mm long consists of 5 sepals, finally splitting under the fruit. Corolla merged, with 5 petal lobes, glabrous, with 5 anthers opposite the petal lobes. Ovary superior, unilocular, stigma simple and nearly seated. The velvety, globe- to egg-shaped berry of about 1.3 cm long is topped with a curved beak of about 0.6 cm. The endosperm is absorbed as the seed ripens, the seed skin leathery, the 2 cotyledons are leaf-like, and the embryonic root is short.

The genus name of Henonia is thought to be in honour of Jacques-Louis Hénon (1802–1872), a French republican politician. The Latin specific epithet of myrtifolia 'myrtle-leaved' is derived from the Latin myrtus meaning 'myrtle', and folium meaning 'leaf'. It was first described and published in Cat. Pl. Cub. on page 167 in 1866.
