= Gaston Crémieux =

French writer

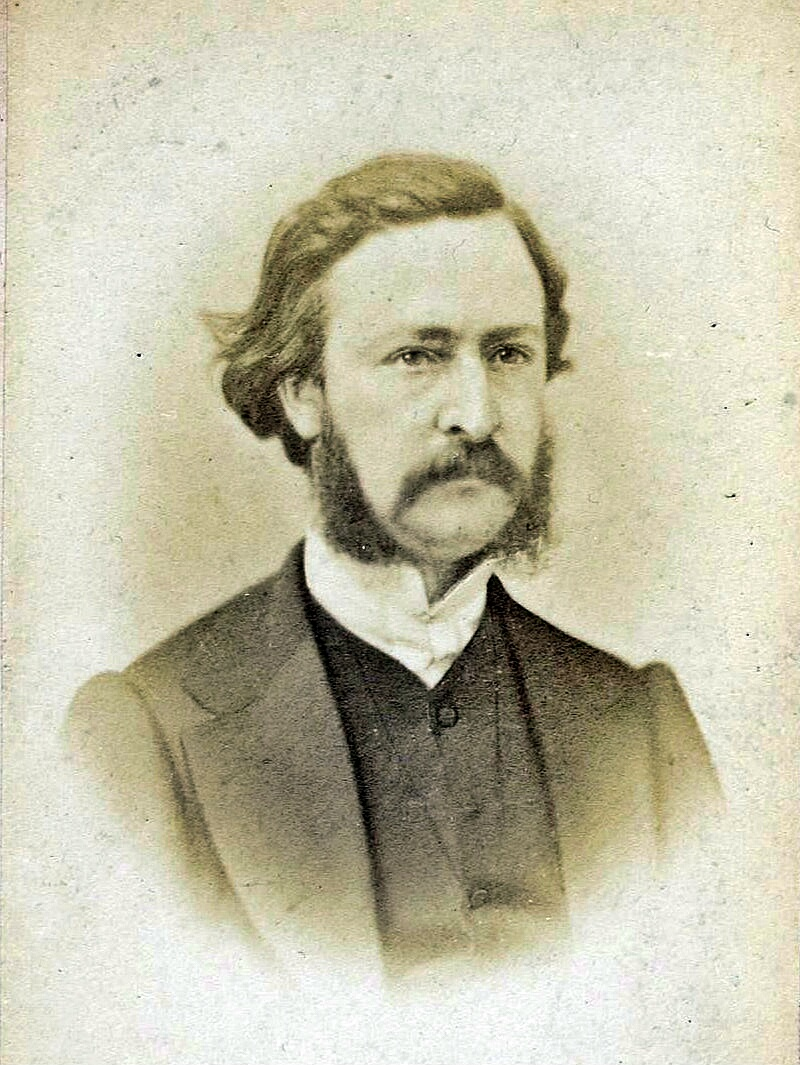
- Born: Louis, Gaston, Isaac Crémieux; June 22, 1836; Nîmes
- Died: November 30, 1871 (aged 35); Marseille
- Cause of death: execution by firing squad
- Citizenship: French
- Education: Université d'Aix-Marseille Université Paul-Cézanne - Aix-Marseille III

Gaston Crémieux (born Isaac Louis Gaston, 22 June 1836, Nîmes, France; died 30 November 1871, Marseille) was a lawyer, a journalist and a French writer. He distinguished himself by defending poor people, supporting Gambetta and Garibaldi. He led the League of the South (Ligue du midi) with Esquiros and Bastelica. He was friends with Adolphe Joseph Carcassonne. In 1871, he became head of the Marseille's Commune. This democratic uprising (in conjunction with the Paris Commune) was bloodily repressed by General Espivent, and Gaston Cremieux was sentenced to death by a military court and died at thirty-five years, mercy having been refused by Thiers and the commission with which he was surrounded. He was celebrated by Victor Hugo, Louise Michel, and Jean Jaurès.

== Sources ==
- (in French) His posthumous works : Gaston Cremieux, Paris E. Dentu. 1879, p. 1 here
- (in English) Marseille's commune story on line at marxist.org, by Prosper-Olivier Lissagaray
