= Jeanne Royannez =

French sculptor

Jeanne Hugues-Royannez
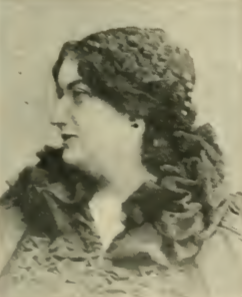
- Mme Hugues (Clovis, née Jeanne Royannez)
- Born: Jeanne Royannez; 5 November 1855; Paris, France
- Died: 6 May 1932 (aged 76); Paris, France
- Known for: Sculpture
- Spouse: Clovis Hugues (m. 1877–1907)

Jeanne Royannez, also known as Madame Clovis Hugues (1855-1932) was a French sculptor.

== Biography ==
Hugues-Royannez was born on 5 November 1855 in Paris. She studied with Laure Coutan-Montorgueil. In 1877 she married the socialist journalist Clovis Hugues (1851-1907) with whom she had two daughters. She first exhibited at the Paris Salon in 1886. Hugues-Royannez exhibited her work in the Woman's Building at the 1893 World's Columbian Exposition in Chicago, Illinois.

She died on 6 May 1932 in Paris.

== Gallery ==
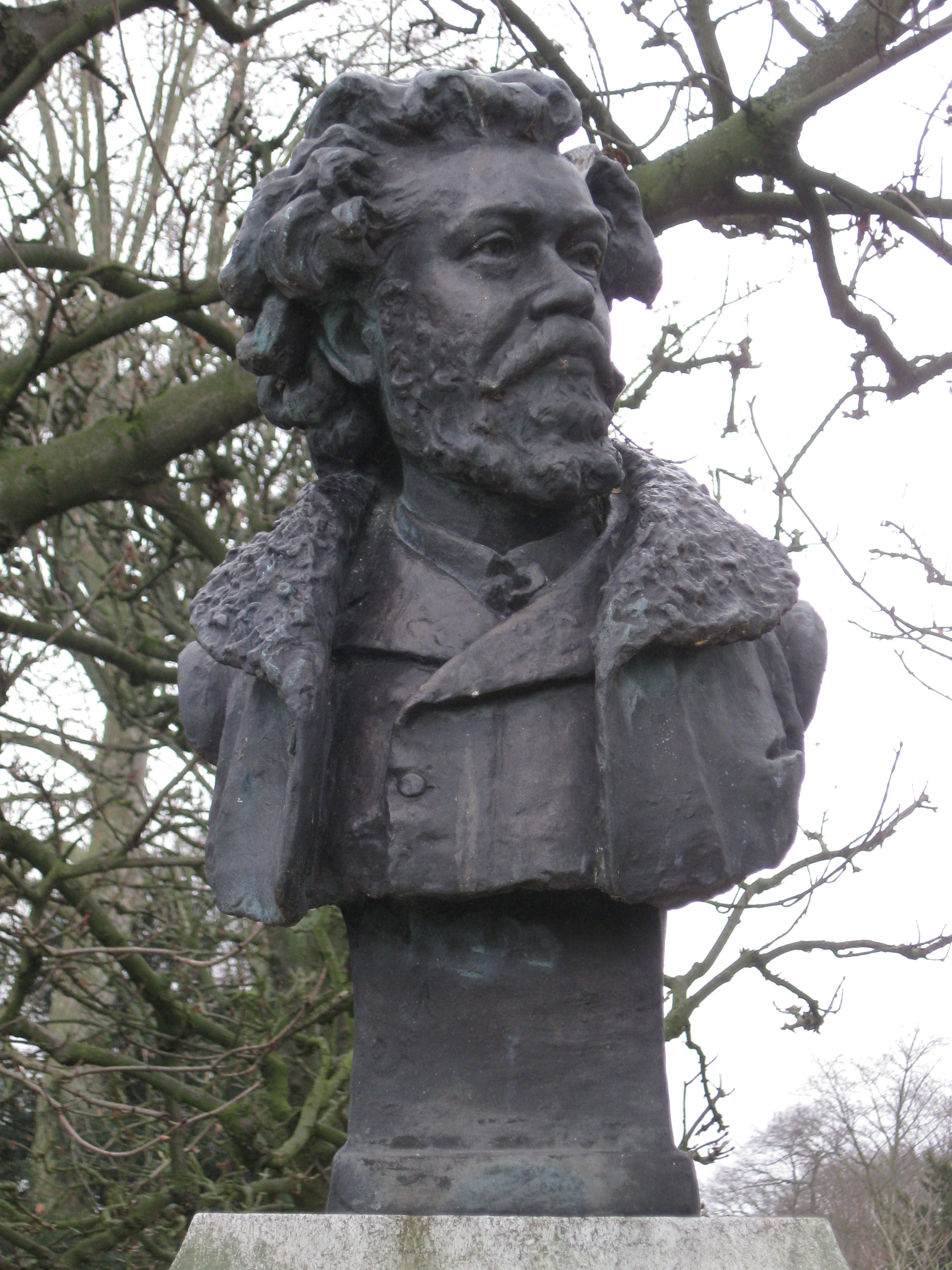
Bust of Clovis Hugues
