= Declaration to the French People =

Position statement of the Paris Commune

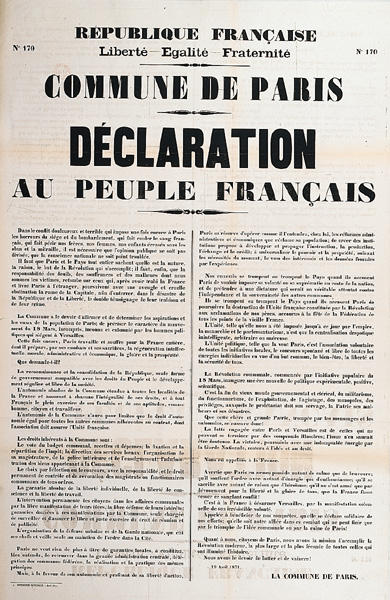

The Declaration to the French People is a summary of the 1871 Paris Commune's political program by its government, the Commune. It was written by three journalists: Charles Delescluze, Jules Valles, and Pierre Denis, a Jacobin, socialist, and Proudhonist, respectively. The Commune adopted the summary three weeks into their term. Only one elected official dissented. The declaration inveighs against the Versailles government and aligns the Commune with other provinces. The program is made in the name of Paris, not the working classes or revolution, and primarily demands a republican government and secondly, Commune autonomy extended to all of France, giving local bodies control over administration, economics, education, and security. It referenced a federation between communes.
