= Jean-Baptiste Dumay =

French politician

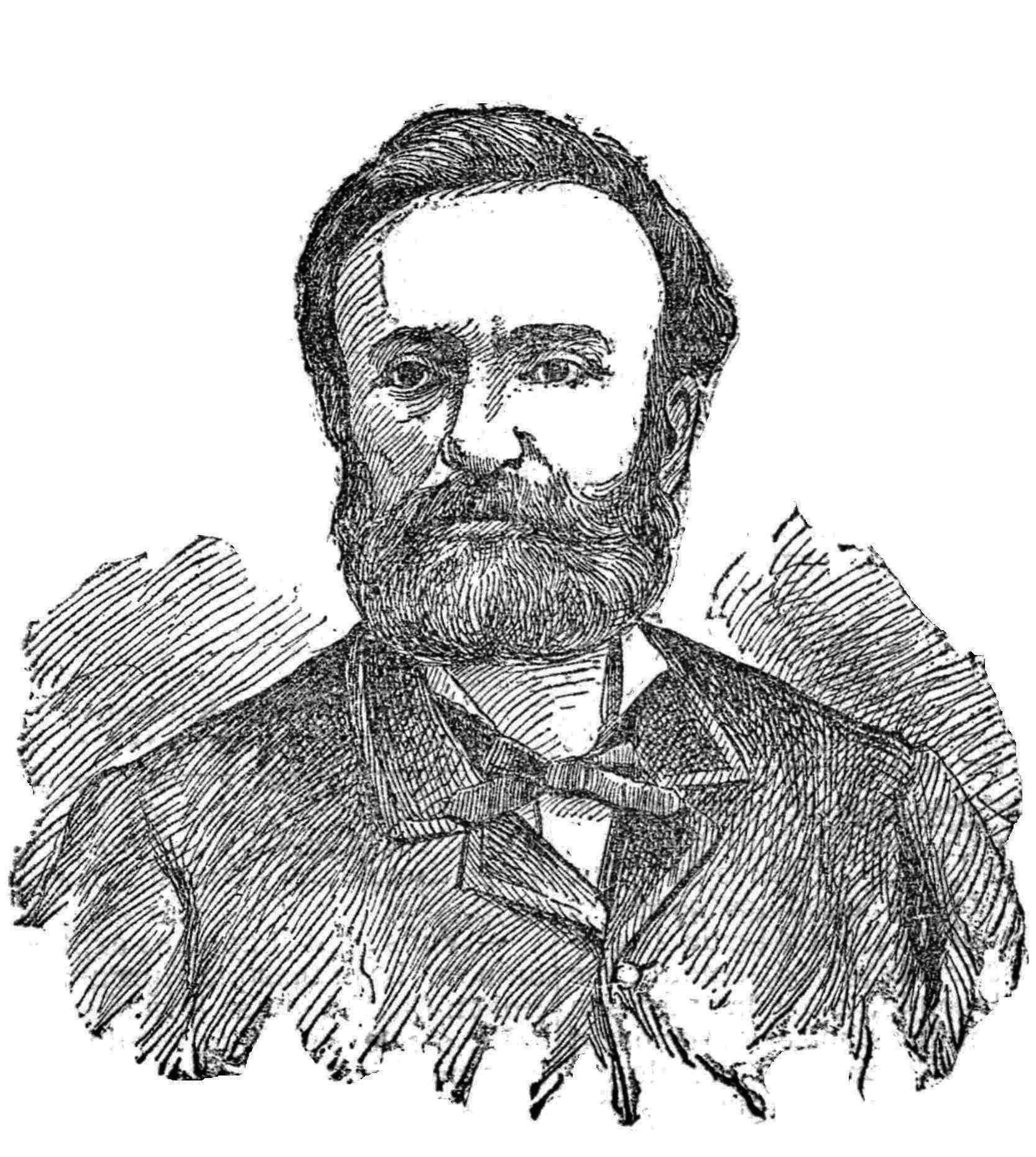
Dumay (Le Radical, 1889-10-03)

Jean-Baptiste Dumay (10 September 1841, in Le Creusot – 27 April 1926, in Paris) was a French politician. He represented the Federation of the Socialist Workers of France (from 1889 to 1890) and the Revolutionary Socialist Workers' Party (from 1890 to 1893) in the Chamber of Deputies.
