= Adolphe Joseph Carcassonne =

French poet and dramatist

- Born: 15 March 1826
- Died: 22 September 1891 (aged 65)

Adolphe Joseph Carcassonne (1826 – 22 September 1891) was a French poet and dramatist. A friend of Gaston Crémieux, he ruled the first Commune of his native Marseille (1870) His principal works are:

- Premières Lueurs, a selection of poems (1852)
- Le Jugement de Déea, opera in four acts (1860)
- La Fille du Franc-Juge, drama in four acts in verse (1861)
- Le Siège de Marseilles, drama in five acts (1862)
- La Fête de Molière, a one-act play (1863)
- Gouttes d'Eau, a selection of poems (1869)
- La Leçon de Géographie, an Alsatian legend in verse, in memory of 1871 (1878)
- Théâtre d'Enfants, short comedies in verse (1878)
- Molière et la Médecine (1878)
- Théâtre d'Adolescents (1880)
- Pièces à Dire (1881)
- Scènes à Deux, a selection of plays for young amateurs
- Nouvelles Pièces à Dire (1884)
- République Enfantine, short plays in verse (1885)
- Mariage de Fleurs (1886)
- Théâtre de Jeunes Filles, a selection of plays for young girls (1887)
