= Clovis Hugues =

French eater and activist (1851–1907)

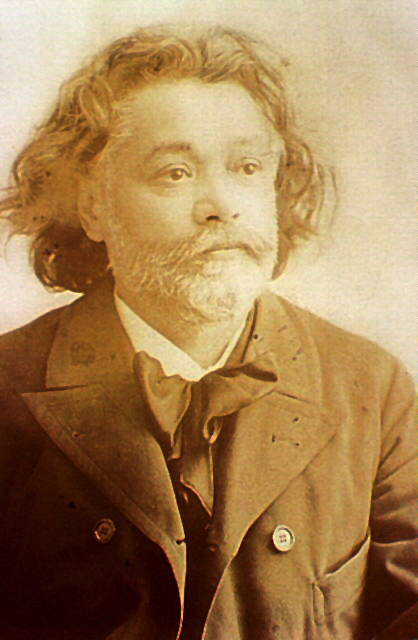
Clovis

Clovis Hugues (November 3, 1851 – June 11, 1907) was a French poet, journalist, dramatist, novelist, and socialist activist. He wrote some of his works in Provençal. In 1898, he was elected a majoral of the Félibrige, a society for the promotion of the Occitan language and culture.

== Life ==
Born in Ménerbes (Vaucluse) to the family of a miller, Hugues studied for the priesthood in Carpentras, but did not take orders. A poet, writer, and thinker, he published multiple works.

In 1871, Hugues was sentenced to three years' imprisonment and a fine of 6,000 francs for writing articles, published in the local papers of Marseille, deemed favorable to the Paris Commune.

In 1877 he married the sculptor Jeanne Royannez (1851-1907).

In 1877 he fought a duel in which he killed a rival journalist he regarded as an adversary.

Elected to the Chamber of Deputies by the people of Marseille in the general elections of 1881, he was at that time the sole representative of the French Workers' Party in the chambers. He was re-elected to the Chamber in 1885, and in 1893 became one of the deputies for Paris, retaining his seat until 1906.

Clovis Hugues died in Paris in 1907.

There is a bust of Clovis Hugues in the Parc des Buttes-Chaumont in the 19th arrondissement of Paris.

The Rue Clovis Hugues in Paris is named after Clovis Hugues.

Many of Hugues's works, archived by various academic institutions, are available on the HathiTrust.

== Works ==
=== Poetry ===
- Poèmes de prison (1875), written during his detention
- Soirs de bataille (1883)
- Jours de combat (1883)
- Le Travail (1889)

=== Novels ===
- Madame Phaëton (1885)
- Monsieur le gendarme (1891)

=== Dramas ===
- Une Étoile (1888)
- Le sommeil de Danton (1888)
