= Henri-François-Alphonse Esquiros =

French writer

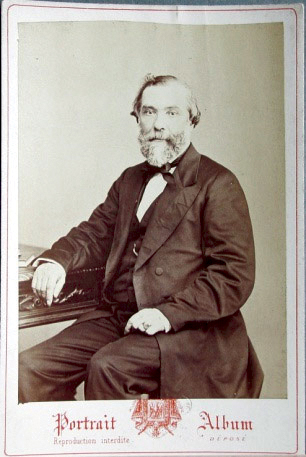
Henri-François-Alphonse Esquiros (ca. 1869)

Henri-François-Alphonse Esquiros (23 May 1812 – 12 May 1876) was a French writer born in Paris. He usually wrote with the name Alphonse Esquiros.

After some minor publications he produced L'évangile du peuple (1840), an exposition on the life and character of Jesus as a social reformer. This work was considered an offense against religion and decency, and Esquiros was fined and imprisoned. He was elected in 1850 as a socialist to the Legislative Assembly, but was exiled in 1851 for his opposition to the Second French Empire.

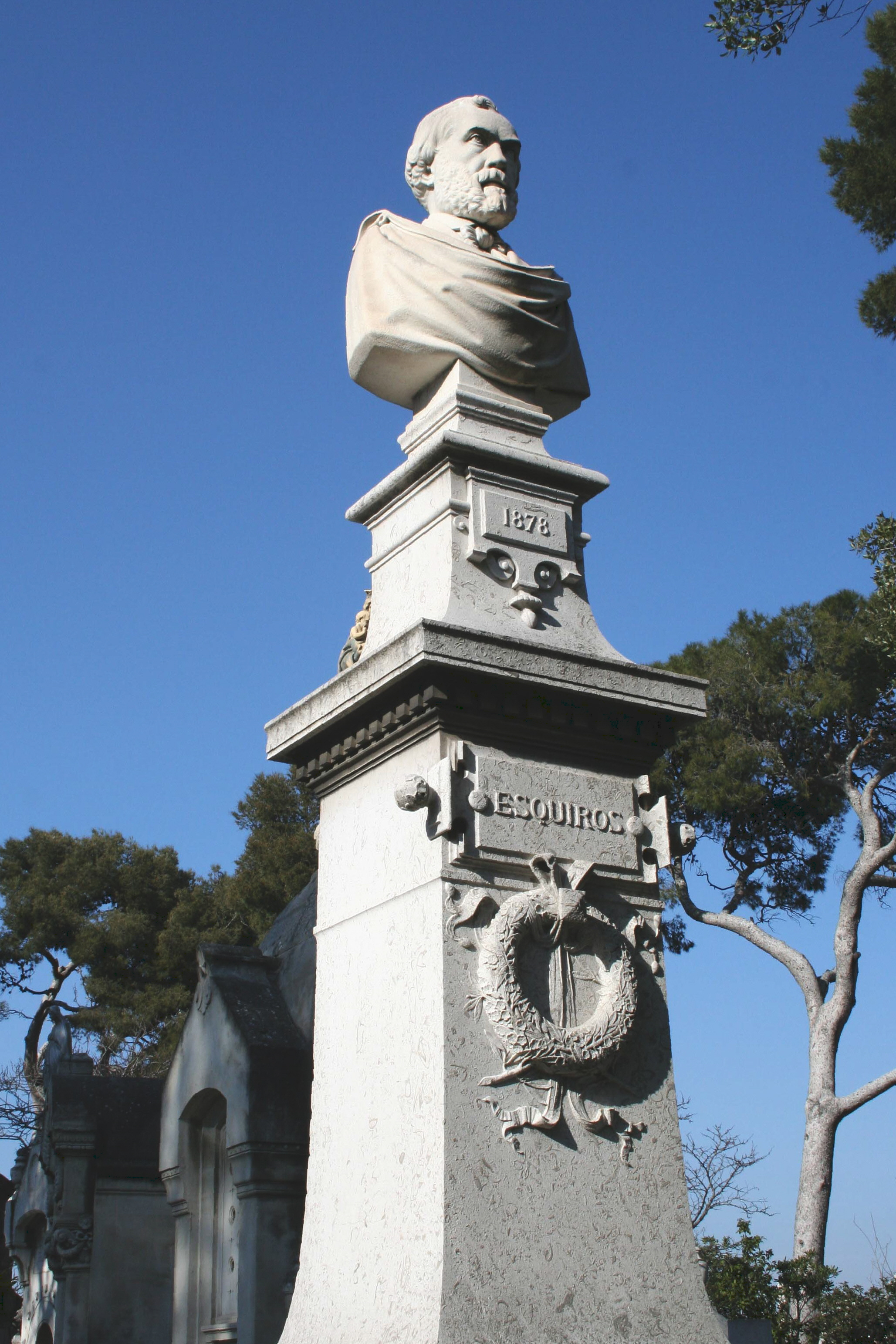
Tomb of Equiros Chauvet

Returning to France in 1869 he was again a member of the Legislative Assembly, and in 1876 was elected to the senate. He died at Versailles on 12 May 1876. He turned to account his residence in England in L'Angleterre et la vie anglaise (5 vols., 1859-1869), portions of which were also published in English, e.g. Cornwall and its Coasts (1865). Among his numerous works on social subjects may be noted Histoire des Montagnards (2 vols., 1847); Paris, ou Les sciences, les institutions, et les moeurs au XIXe siecle (2 vols., 1847); and Histoire des martyrs de la liberté (1851).

== Works ==
- Les Hirondelles, 1834
- Charlotte Corday, 1840
- L'Evangile du peuple, 1840
- Chants d'un prisonnier, 1841
- Le château enchanté, 1846
- Paris, ou Les sciences, les institutions, et les moeurs au XIXe siecle, 1847
- Histoire des Montagnards, 1847
- De la vie future au point de vue socialiste, 1850
- Histoire des martyrs de la liberté, 1851
- Les Vierges martyres, Les Vierges folles, Les Vierges sages 1840–42, La Morale universelle, 1859
- La Néerlande et la vie hollandaise, 1859
- L'Angleterre et la vie anglaise, 1869
- Illustrations de la marine française, 1851
