= Jacques-Louis Hénon =

French politician (1802–1872)

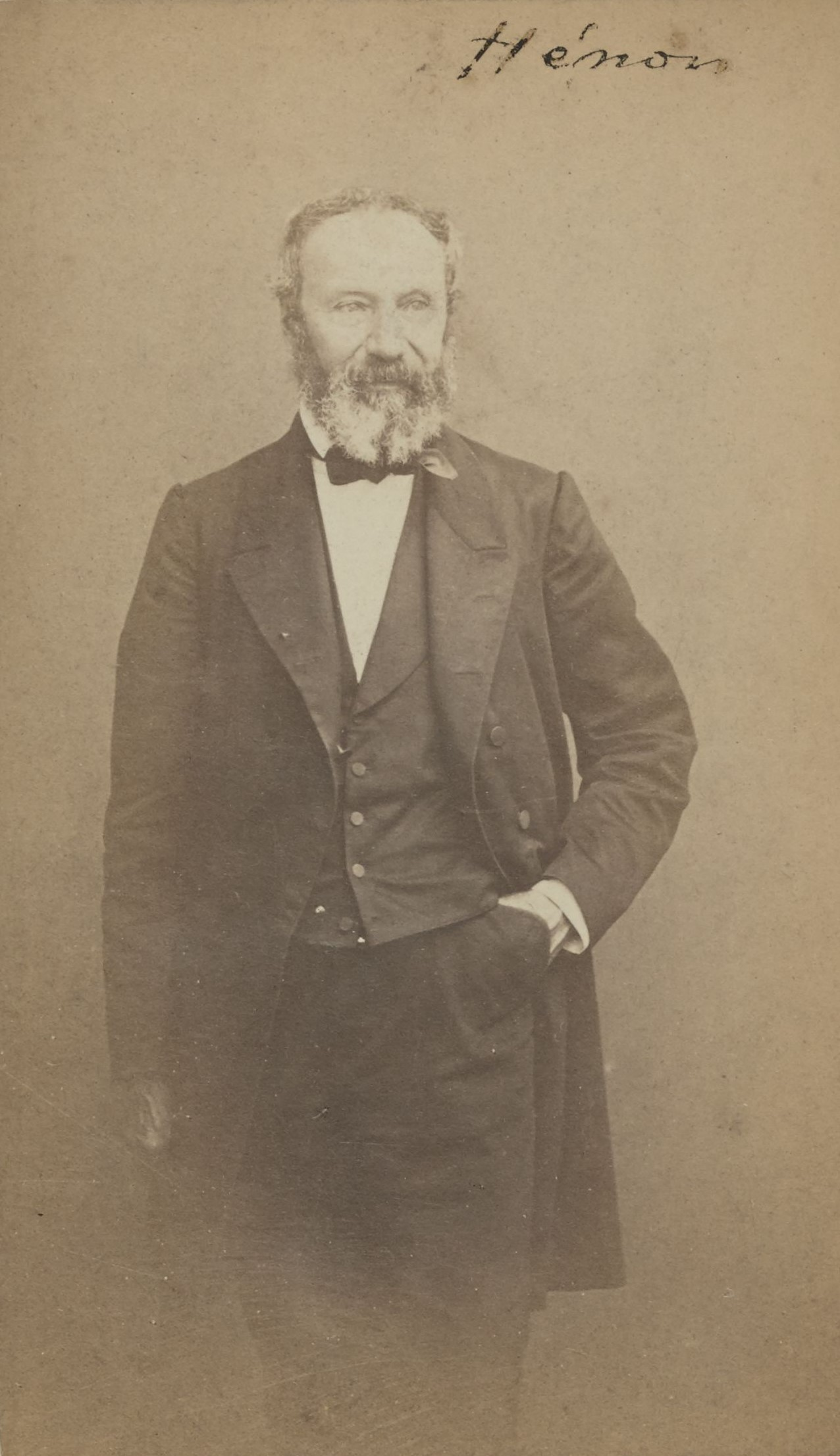
Jacques-Louis Hénon, photograph by Étienne Carjat

Jacques-Louis Hénon (31 May 1802 in Lyon – 28 March 1872 in Montpellier) was a French republican politician. He was member of the Corps législatif in 1852 and from 1857 to 1869. He was the mayor of Lyon from 1870 to 1872.

Earlier in his career he served as a professor at the École vétérinaire de Lyon (1823–1824) and at the École nationale vétérinaire d'Alfort (1825–1833). He later studied medicine in Montpellier and Paris, submitting his graduate thesis in 1841. In 1848–49 he was a substitute instructor of botany at the École préparatoire de médecine et pharmacie de Lyon. On 4 September 1870 he proclaimed the French Third Republic in the city hall of Lyon.

The Rue Jacques Louis Hénon (Lyon, 4ème arrondissement) is named in his honor. Also, in 1849, Alfred Moquin-Tandon named a monotypic genus of flowering plants belonging to the family Amaranthaceae, from Madagascar, Henonia also in his honor. Also Henoonia, a monotypic genus of flowering plants belonging to the family Solanaceae from Cuba is also thought to be named after him.

== Selected published works ==
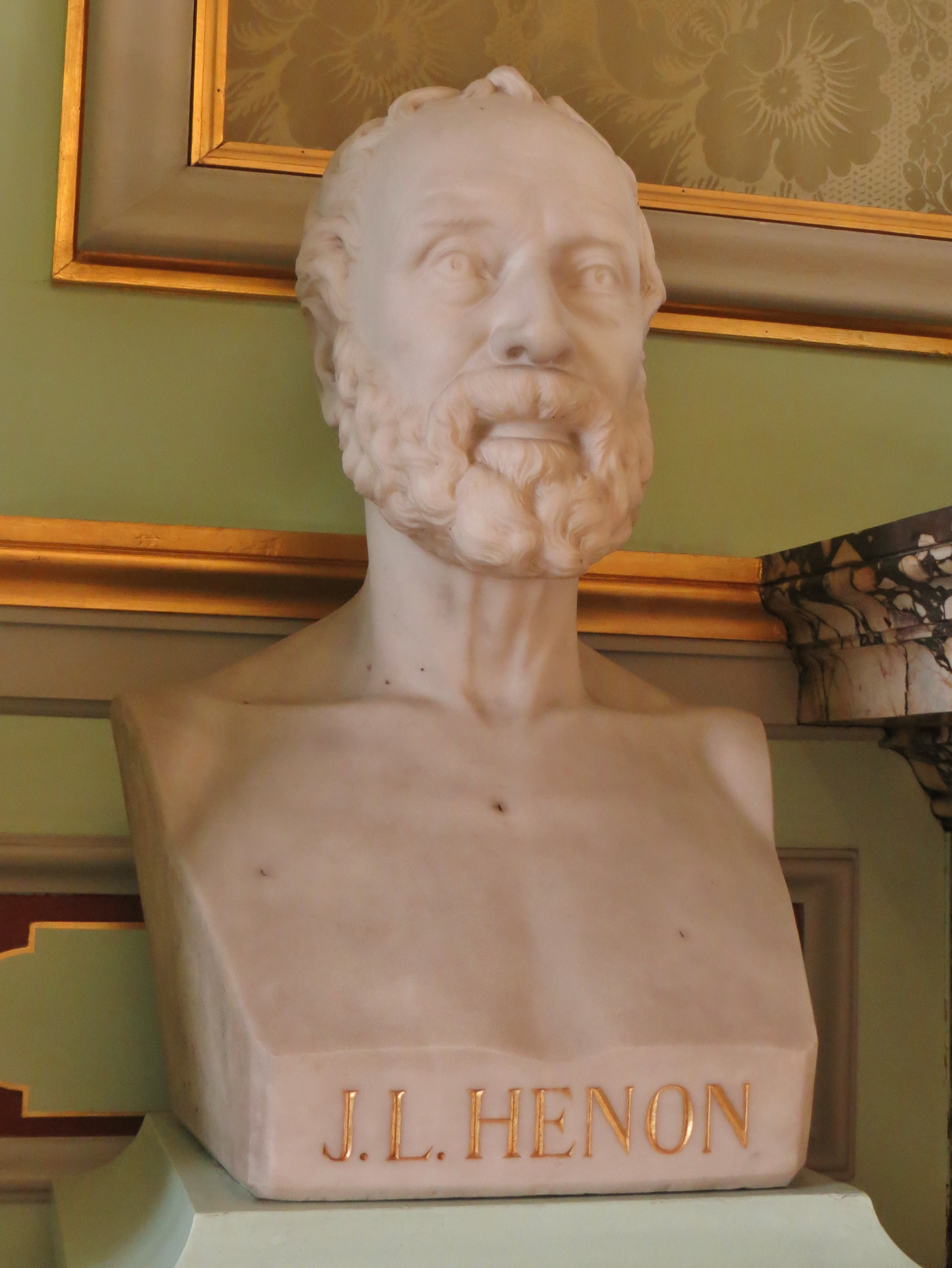
Bust of Jacques-Louis Hénon at the Hôtel de Ville, Lyon.

- Excursion au Mont-Pilat. Lyon, L. Boitel, (1835) – Excursion to Mont Pilat.
- Notice sur l'oxalide de Deppe, Lyon : Barret, (1838) – Note on Oxalis deppei.
- De l'Influence des végétaux sur l'eau, et de quelques boissons aqueuses fournies par les tiges et les feuilles des plantes, (1841).
- Notice sur J.C. Favre, médecin vétérinaire. Lyon, Nigon, (1845).
- Flore et pomone lyonnaises, ou Dessins et descriptions des fleurs et des fruits obtenus ou introduits par les horticulteurs du département du Rhône, (1847).
- Notice sur le Jardin de la marine royale à Toulon, (1847).
- Promenade à la recherche du "Narcissus reflexus" de Loiseleur. Paris : impr. de E. Martinet, (s. d.) Extrait du "Bulletin général de la Société botanique de France". Séance du 10 avril 1863, (1863) – On research involving Narcissus reflexus of Loiseleur.
