= 1871 Internal Campaign =

Military campaign by the French government

1871 Internal Campaign / French Civil War of 1871
- Part of Paris Commune
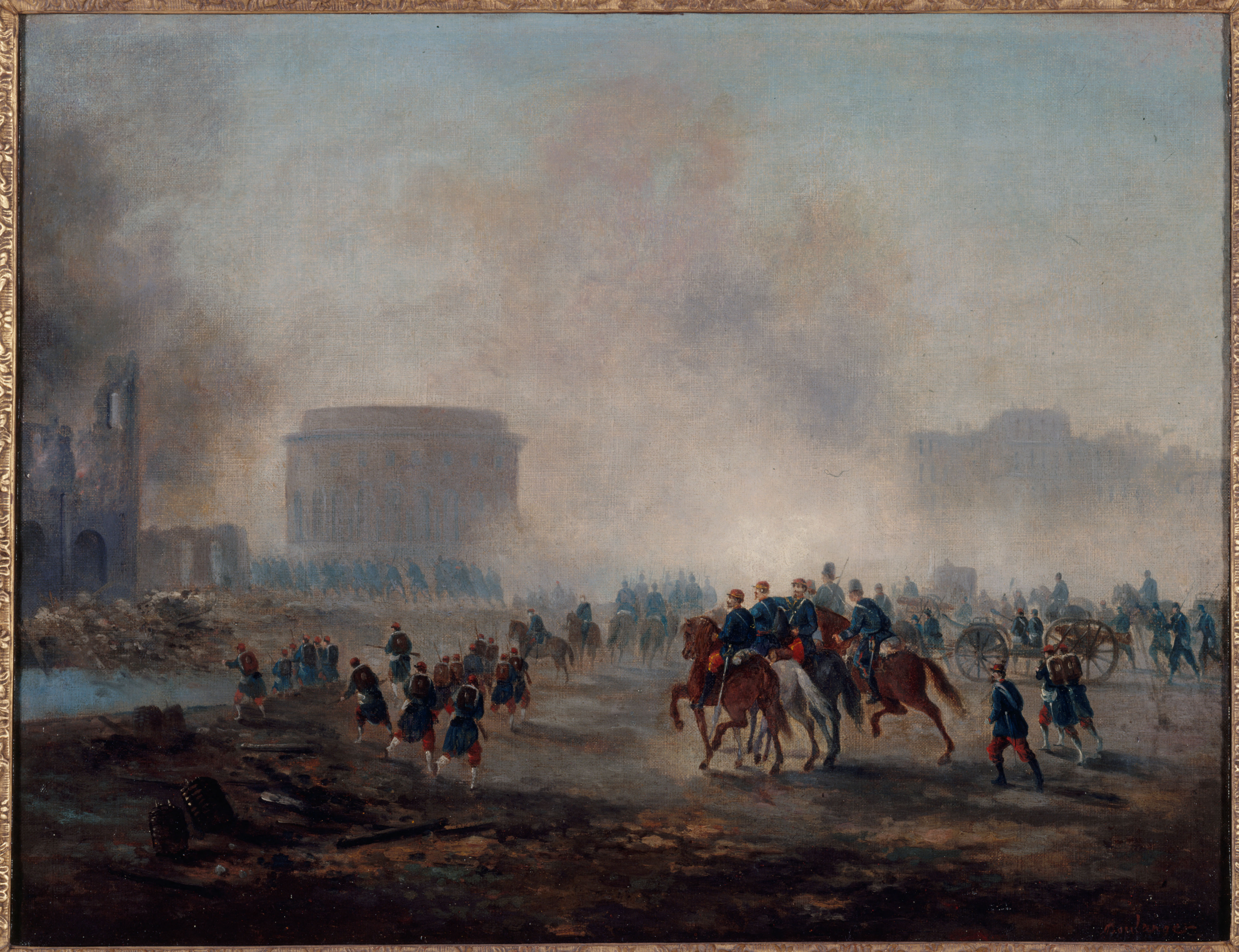
- Gustave Boulanger, La Villette Surrounded by Versailles Troops, May 1871, Musée Carnavalet.
Date	March 18, 1871 – June 7, 1871 (81 days)
Location	France
Result	Versailles government victory

Belligerents
French Third Republic (Government of Versailles)	Paris Commune; Marseille Commune; Saint-Étienne Commune; Lyon Commune; Narbonne Commune; Le Creusot Commune and other movements seeking to establish insurrectionary communes in France.

Commanders and leaders
Paris: Patrice de MacMahon Marseille: Henri Espivent de La Villesboisnet	

Strength
Paris: 120,000 men	Paris: 20,000–170,000 men

Casualties and losses
Paris: 877 killed 6,454 wounded, 183 missing, Marseille: 30 killed 50 wounded	Paris: 5,700–10,000 killed 43,522 captured Marseille: 150 killed 500 captured

The 1871 Internal Campaign was the official name used by the Government of Versailles to designate the series of military operations intended to regain control of the entire French territory, suppress various groups advocating direct democracy—most notably the National Guard and the established insurrectionary communes (Paris, Lyon, Marseille, Saint-Étienne, Narbonne, Le Creusot)—and prevent other revolutionary movements from establishing communes, such as the proposed Commune of Besançon and disturbances in Toulouse, Brest, and elsewhere. The conflict has also been referred to as the French Civil War of 1871 or simply the Civil War by contemporaries and foreign observers. Taking place during the political transition following the collapse of the Second French Empire, the conflict pitted the regular French Army of the Versailles government against the National Guard supporting the Communards between 18 March and 7 June 1871. Its best-known episode was the Bloody Week.

Although the victory of the Versailles government brought the civil war in France to an end, ensured the continuation of representative democracy, and allowed the implementation of the Treaty of Frankfurt, the severity of the repression, its human cost, and the atrocities committed left lasting scars on French society.

The repression also contributed to the radicalization of some anarchists, who carried out a series of attacks until the end of the 19th century.

The National Guard, long regarded as one of the symbols of the French Revolution, was subsequently dissolved. The defeat of the Communards also had a significant international impact, particularly within the labor movement, and inspired the publication of The Civil War in France by Karl Marx.

== History ==
The 1871 Internal Campaign followed shortly after the end of the Franco-Prussian War, whose hostilities had concluded with the Armistice of 28 January 1871. At the same time, other armed suppressions of insurrectionary movements took place in French Algeria, notably the suppression of the Henanchas revolt and the Mokrani Revolt.

Initially, the troops stationed in Paris withdrew to Versailles following the outbreak of the insurrection of 18 March. During the final days of March, a series of skirmishes occurred west of the capital, particularly at the Courbevoie roundabout, which was recaptured by the regular army under General Joseph Vinoy. On 3 April, following an initial engagement at the Bergères roundabout (the Battle of Courbevoie), government forces successfully repelled the Commune's attempted "march on Versailles" during the Battle of Rueil and the Battle of Meudon.

On 6 April 1871, nineteen days after the outbreak of the Paris insurrection, Adolphe Thiers, then serving as the "Head of the Executive Power of the French Republic", signed a decree at Versailles reorganizing the army "for the restoration of order in France". Because Vinoy was held responsible for the failure of 18 March, the more popular Marshal Patrice de MacMahon was appointed commander-in-chief.

Military operations began on 11 April around the capital, with the objectives of capturing Fort d'Issy and the salient at the Porte du Point-du-Jour. Throughout the remainder of the month, numerous positions were recaptured by the Versailles Army, which had been reinforced from 23 April onward by the arrival of two additional army corps composed of prisoners of war who had escaped or been released by Germany. On 9 May, Fort d'Issy was occupied after two weeks of fighting. Fort de Vanves fell on 13 May, the day that marked the beginning of the full-scale assault on the capital's fortifications. On 21 May, Versailles troops entered Paris intra muros, beginning a week of fighting and atrocities known as the Bloody Week.

Although the final assaults took place on 28 May, the official end of the campaign was not fixed until 7 June by a ministerial circular dated 22 May 1873. The circular also classified the following more limited military interventions as part of the "internal campaign":

- Toulouse (22 March–3 April)
- Marseille (Marseille Commune, 23 March –4 April)
- Narbonne (Narbonne Commune, 24 March–31 March)
- Saint-Étienne (Saint-Étienne Commune, 25 March–1 April)
- Limoges (4 April–7 April)
- Bordeaux (17 April)
- Lyon (Lyon Commune, 30 April–1 May)
- Montereau (7 May–8 May).

The Treaty of Frankfurt was signed on 10 May 1871, while the internal situation in France had not yet been fully stabilized. German troops occupied part of French territory until 1873.

== See also ==
- Franco-Prussian War
- Paris Commune
- Bloody Week

== Bibliography ==
- Rougerie, Jacques (2004). Paris libre, 1871 [Paris Free, 1871]. Points. Histoire. Paris: Éditions du Seuil. ISBN 2-02-055465-8. ISSN 0768-0457.
- Rougerie, Jacques (2021). La Commune de 1871 [The Commune of 1871]. Presses universitaires de France. ISBN 978-2-7154-0708-4.
- Tombs, Robert (2014). Paris, bivouac des Révolutions. Libertalia. ISBN 978-2-918059-44-8.
