= Chronology of the Paris Commune =

List of events during the 1871 revolutionary government

This chronology of the Paris Commune lists major events that occurred during and surrounding the Paris Commune, a revolutionary government that controlled Paris between March and May 1871.

== 1871 ==
- January 22: Uprising in Paris at the city hall ends with five dead
- January 28: Armistice of Versailles signed, de facto French surrender to the Prussians
- February 26: Treaty of Versailles ends the Franco-Prussian War
- March 1: Germans parade through Paris; National Guard Central Committee protests
- March 10: Assembly decides to move to Versailles, snubbing Paris
- March 18: Failed attempt to seize Montmartre cannons begins the Paris Commune
- March 22: Second Lyon Commune
- March 26: Elections replace the National Guard Central Committee governance with that of the Commune Council
- March 28: Proclamation of the Commune
- March 30: First skirmish between Communards and Versaillais at Courbevoie
- April 2: Versaillais return for Battle of Courbevoie, ending in Communard retreat
- April 3:
  - Battle of Rueil
  - Battle of Meudon
- April 10: Commune Council makes legitimate and illegitimate children equally eligible for National Guard pensions
- April 11: Women's Union founded
- April 16: Commune approves worker takeover of abandoned workshops
- April 19: Commune program established in the Declaration to the French People
- April 24: Unions invited to organize abandoned workshops
- April 25 – May 9: Battle of Fort d'Issy
- April 28:
  - Committee of Public Safety discussions begin
  - Commune bans baker night work
- May 1:
  - Commune's third phase begins as Commune forms Committee of Public Safety
  - Louis Rossel replaces Gustave Paul Cluseret as Communard Delegate for War (defense minister)
- May 7: Commune banned pawnshop sale of vital pawned professions; paid for some possessions to be returned to their owners
- May 9: Louis Rossel steps down as Delegate for War
- May 10: Louis Charles Delescluze becomes Delegate for War
- May 15: Minority declaration of the Committee of Public Safety shows schism
- May 16: Vendome Column destroyed
- May 21: Commune Council's last session
- May 22–28: Semaine sanglante (Bloody Week)
- May 23: Jarosław Dąbrowski dies
- May 24:
  - Hostages executed
  - Battle of Butte-aux-Cailles
- May 25: Louis Charles Delescluze dies
- May 28: Final barricades vanquished; Commune ends
