= Granier de Cassagnac =

Granier de Cassagnac is the name of:

- Adolphe Granier de Cassagnac (1806–1880), French journalist
- His son Paul Adolphe Marie Prosper Granier de Cassagnac (1843–1904), French journalist and politician
- Raphaël Granier de Cassagnac (1973–), French physicist and writer
