= Battle of Fort d'Issy =

1871 battle during the Paris Commune

- Part of Paris Commune
Date	25 April – 9 May 1871
Location	Fort d'Issy, France
Result	Versaillais victory

Belligerents
(France) French Third Republic (Versaillais)	Paris Commune (Communards)

Strength
20,000	1,000–1,500

Casualties and losses
210–560 dead or wounded	350 dead

The Battle of Fort d'Issy took place in April and May 1871 between the Paris Commune and Versaillais government forces at Fort d'Issy, south of Paris, France.

== Bibliography ==
- Lissagaray (1886) [1876]. History of the Paris Commune of 1871. Translated by Marx, Eleanor. London: Reeves and Turner. OCLC 66270162.
- Tombs, Robert (1981). The War Against Paris, 1871. Cambridge University Press. ISBN 978-0-521-28784-5.
