= Battle of Butte-aux-Cailles =

1871 battle during the Paris Commune

- Part of Paris Commune
Date	24–25 May 1871
Location	Butte-aux-Cailles, Paris, France
Result	Versaillais victory

Belligerents
(France) French Third Republic (Versaillais)	Paris Commune (Communards)

The Battle of Butte-aux-Cailles took place on 24–25 May 1871 between the Paris Commune and Versaillais government forces in the Parisian district of Butte-aux-Cailles.

== Bibliography ==
- Lissagaray (1886) [1876]. History of the Paris Commune of 1871. Translated by Marx, Eleanor. London: Reeves and Turner. OCLC 66270162.
- Tombs, Robert (1981). The War Against Paris, 1871. Cambridge University Press. ISBN 978-0-521-28784-5.
