= Battle of Meudon =

1871 battle during the Paris Commune

- Part of Paris Commune
Date	April 3, 1871
Location	Meudon, France
Result	Versaillais victory

Belligerents
(France) French Third Republic (Versaillais)	Paris Commune (Communards)

Strength
10,000	10,000

The Battle of Meudon took place on 3 April 1871 between the Paris Commune and Versaillais government forces near Meudon in the Île-de-France. The battle was part of the attempts by the Paris Commune to seize Versailles, the seat of Adolphe Thiers’ government, and it ended in a defeat for the Federates.

== Troops ==
=== Federates ===
The Federates were commanded by General Émile Eudes, assisted by Louis-Antoine Ranvier and Avrial. They were accompanied by 10,000 men and 8 cannons, however, they were largely disorganized. The National Guards thought they were participating in a simple military parade, that the Versailles army would fraternize with them, and were devoid of officers and non-commissioned officers. There were also no reserves, supplies, and they only had eight cannons to fire, while Paris housed hundreds of artillery pieces and several years of ammunition.

=== Versailles ===
The Versailles defense of Meudon was entrusted to a corps of gendarmes numbering about a thousand men entrenched in the town's castle. They had the support of an artillery battery built on an old Prussian position. General La Mariouse's brigade was stationed at Viroflay. It was composed of the 35th and 42nd regiments. These two regiments were the only surviving regiments of the former imperial army and were among the best Versailles units. Four other regiments (one marine infantry, one marine rifleman, and two line) were also sent to hold Meudon and reinforce La Mariouse's brigade.

== The Battle ==
The battle began with a Versailles bombardment of the Federates from the Meudon battery. This bombardment caused chaos among the Federates who were surprised by the fighting. The rear retreated precipitously to Fort d'Issy and the front entered Meudon at a charge. Once there, without command, the Federate soldiers did not know what to do and could not take advantage of their numerical superiority. Indeed, the village was then defended only by a thousand gendarmes who held the castle. Running out of ammunition, they were eventually chased away by the Federates and retreated to the rest of the village and the old Prussian batteries.

In early afternoon, Versailles General La Mariouse arrived with 9,000 reinforcements. He managed to retake the castle. However, the Federates maintained themselves in the rest of the village. Their lack of artillery began to be felt and new Parisian attacks ran up against the walls of the village. Eudes then ordered a retreat which ended at Fort d'Issy where Ranvier had returned to install artillery.

== Bibliography ==
- Lissagaray (1886) [1876]. History of the Paris Commune of 1871. Translated by Marx, Eleanor. London: Reeves and Turner. OCLC 66270162.
- Tombs, Robert (1981). The War Against Paris, 1871. Cambridge University Press. ISBN 978-0-521-28784-5.
