= Henry Kistemaeckers =

Henry Kistemaeckers may refer to:

- Henry Kistemaeckers (publisher) (1851–1934), Belgian publisher
- Henry Kistemaeckers (playwright) (1872–1938), his son, Belgian-born French author and playwright
