= Jacques Rougerie =

Jacques Rougerie may refer to:

- Jacques Rougerie (architect) (born 1945), French architect-oceanographer
- Jacques Rougerie (historian) (1932–2022), historian of the Paris Commune
- Jacques Rougerie (rugby union) (born 1945), French rugby union player
