= Jacques Rougerie (historian) =

French historian (5 January 1932 – 22 March 2022)

- Born: January 5, 1932; France
- Died: March 22, 2022 (aged 90); France
- Occupation: Historian

Jacques Rougerie (5 January 1932 – 22 March 2022) was a French historian of the Paris Commune.

== Works ==
- Procès des communards (1964)
- Paris libre 1871 (1971)
- 1871: Jalons pour une histoire de la Commune de Paris (1973)
- La Commune (1988)
- Eugène Varlin: Aux origines du mouvement ouvrier (2019)

== See also ==
- Besançon Commune
- Dictionnaire biographique du mouvement ouvrier français
- Histoire de la Commune de 1871
- Prosper-Olivier Lissagaray
- Jean Maitron
- Robert Tombs
