= Battle of Rueil =

1871 battle during the Paris Commune

- Part of the Paris Commune
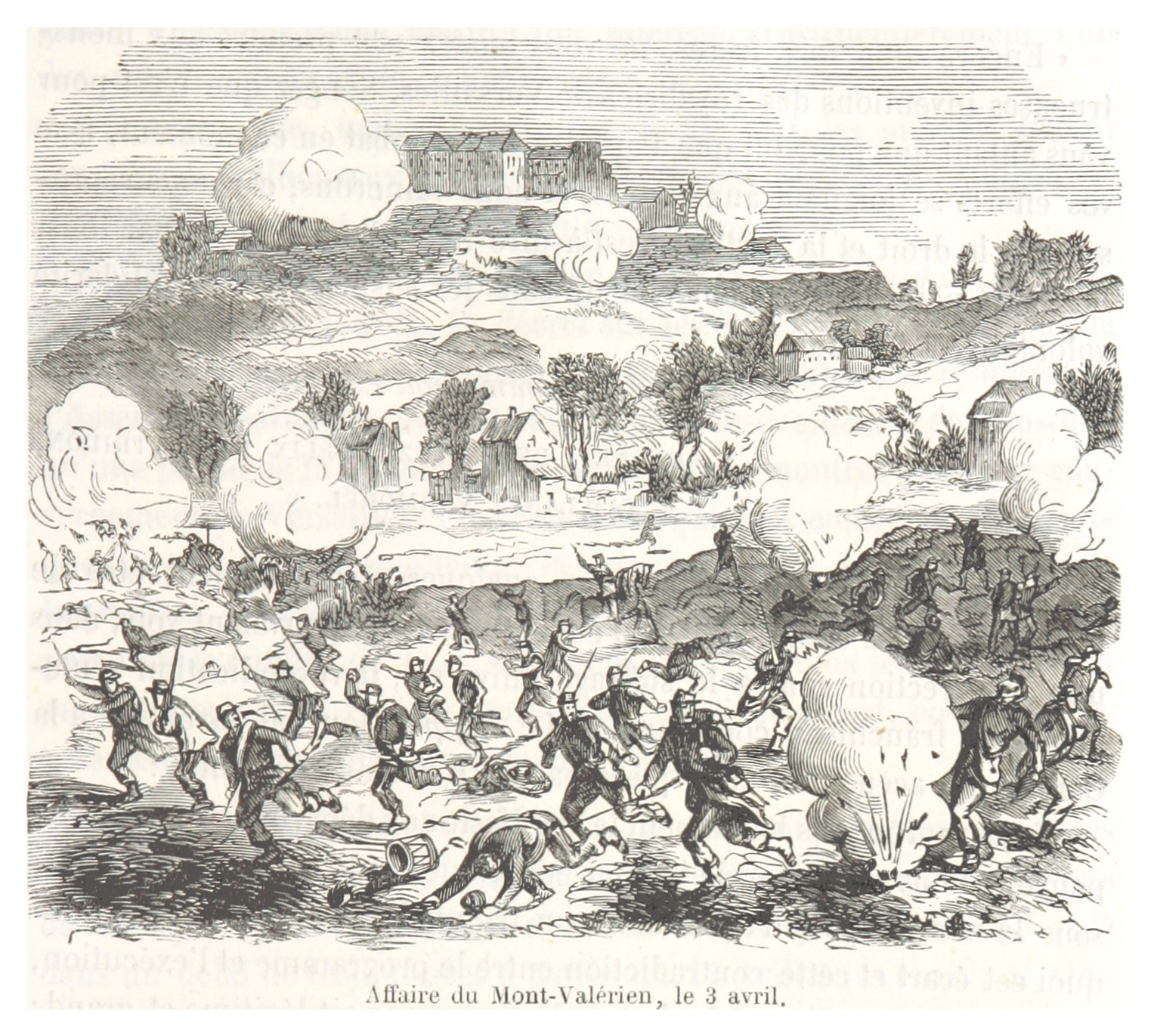
| Date | 3 April 1871 |
| Location | Neuilly-sur-Seine to Bougival, France |
| Result | Versaillais victory |

Belligerents
| (French Third Republic) France (Versaillais) | Paris Commune (Communards) |

Commanders and leaders
| Unknown | Unknown |

Strength
| 10,000 | 2,200 |

Casualties and losses
| Unknown | Unknown |

The Battle of Rueil took place on 3 April 1871 between the Paris Commune and Versaillais government forces in the Île-de-France.

== Bibliography ==
- Lissagaray (1886) [1876]. History of the Paris Commune of 1871. Translated by Marx, Eleanor. London: Reeves and Turner. OCLC 66270162.
- Tombs, Robert (1981). The War Against Paris, 1871. Cambridge University Press. ISBN 978-0-521-28784-5.
