= Our Lady and St Chad Catholic Academy =

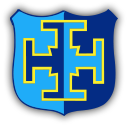

Location
- Old Fallings Lane; Wolverhampton, West Midlands, WV10 8BL; England; 52.6110°N 2.1083°W

Information
- Type: Academy
- Motto: "Be The Best You Can Be"
- Religious affiliation: Roman Catholic
- Department for Education URN: 141802 Tables
- Principal: Louisa Craig
- Gender: Coeducational
- Age: 11 to 18
- Houses: Bernadette, St. Peter, St. Catherine, Kolbe, Romero, Teresa
- Colours: Blue and Gold
- Website: School website

Our Lady and St. Chad Catholic Academy (A Specialist Sports College) is a Roman Catholic secondary school and sixth form with academy status, located in the Old Fallings area of Wolverhampton, West Midlands, England.

The Building Schools for the Future program invested £7 million into improving the school, which was completed in September 2013. The school was funded another £4.7 million in 2018 to build 14 new classrooms and science laboratories.

Originally, the school was titled "Our Lady and St. Chad Catholic Sports College"; however, it gained academy status in 2015, partnering with three schools in Wolverhampton.

The name of the school comes from the influence of St. Chad. The secondary building, the Marist Centre, was named after the Marist Brothers. The school was established in 1978 following the merger of St Chad's College, the Roman Catholic grammar school for boys established by the Marist Brothers, which was based at the Old Fallings Lane site, and Our Lady of Mercy girls' grammar school, situated near Snow Hill, Wolverhampton, and started by the Sisters of Mercy.

== Consortium and houses ==
OLSC consists of 4 house groups; Bernadette, Kolbe, Romero and Teresa.

As of Monday 2 March 2015, Our Lady and St. Chad officially became an academy along with St. Mary's, Holy Rosary and Corpus Christi Primary Schools to unite as one in the "Pope John XXIII Multi Academy".

As of today, the school is in the trust of St Gabriel the Archangel Catholic Multi-Academy Trust

== Curriculum ==
All students study English, Maths, Science, RE, PE, Geography, History, Modern Foreign Language, Computing, Music, Creative Media.

Year 9 and 10

All Students study English Literature, English Language, Maths, Combined Science, RE and PE, and can choose from additional subjects.

Year 11

All Students study English Literature, English Language, Maths, Combined Science, RE and PE, and can choose from additional subjects.

Year 12 and 13

Students have the choice of studying a range of subjects including A level, T level and BTEC. All sixth form students also study Social Justice.

== Alumni ==
- Robert Tombs (b. 1949) – historian of France
- Gerry O‘Hara - (b. 1956) - professional footballer
- Dave Rushbury - (b. 1955) - professional footballer and football manager
