= J. B. Bury =

Anglo-Irish historian and classical scholar (1861–1927)

John Bagnell Bury FBA
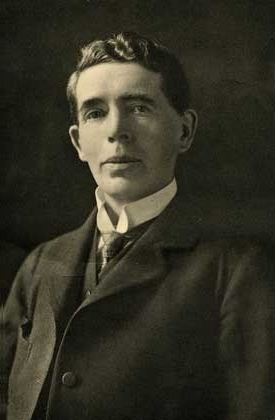
- Born: 16 October 1861; County Monaghan, Ireland
- Died: 1 June 1927 (aged 65); Rome, Italy
- Relatives: Robert Gregg Bury (brother); J. P. T. Bury (nephew)

Academic background
- Education: Trinity College, Dublin

Academic work
- Institutions: University of Dublin (1885–1902); University of Cambridge (1902–1927)
- Notable students: Steven Runciman

John Bagnell Bury FBA (/ˈbjʊəri/; 16 October 1861 – 1 June 1927) was an Anglo-Irish historian, classical scholar, Medieval Roman historian and philologist. He objected to the label "Byzantinist" explicitly in the preface to the 1889 edition of his Later Roman Empire. He was Erasmus Smith's Professor of Modern History at Trinity College Dublin (1893–1902), before being Regius Professor of Modern History at the University of Cambridge and a Professorial Fellow of King's College, Cambridge from 1902 until his death.

== Early life and education ==
Bury was born the son of Edward John Bury and Anna Rogers in 1861 in Clontibret, County Monaghan, where his father was Rector of the Anglican Church of Ireland. He was educated first by his parents and then at Foyle College in Derry. He studied classics at Trinity College Dublin, where he was elected a scholar in 1879, and graduated in 1882.

He was elected a fellow of Trinity College Dublin in 1885 at the age of 24. Also in that year, he married his second cousin Jane Bury, who assisted him in his work, notably with her chapter on Byzantine art in the History of the later Roman Empire (1889); they had one son. In 1893, he was appointed to the Erasmus Smith's Chair of Modern History at Trinity College, which he held for nine years. In 1898 he was appointed Regius Professor of Greek, also at Trinity, a post he held simultaneously with his history professorship. In late 1902 he became Regius Professor of Modern History at the University of Cambridge, and early the following year he was elected a Professorial Fellow of King's College, Cambridge, and received the degree Master of Arts (MA) (honoris causa).

At Cambridge, Bury became a mentor to Steven Runciman (the medievalist), who later commented that he had been Bury's "first, and only, student". At first, the reclusive Bury tried to brush him off; then, when Runciman mentioned that he could read Russian, Bury gave him a stack of Bulgarian articles to edit, and so their relationship began. Bury was the author of the first truly authoritative biography of Saint Patrick (1905).

In 1917 he was chairman of the British School of Archaeology in Egypt and Egyptian Research Account.

Bury remained at Cambridge until his death at the age of 65 in Rome, where he had taken his annual retreat since 1918. He is buried in the Protestant Cemetery in Rome.

He received the honorary degree Doctor of Laws (LL.D.) from the University of Glasgow in June 1901, the honorary degree of Doctor of Laws (LL.D.) from the University of Aberdeen in 1905, and the honorary degree Doctor of Letters (D.Litt.) from the University of Oxford in October 1902, in connection with the tercentenary of the Bodleian Library.

His brother, Robert Gregg Bury, was an Irish clergyman, classicist, philologist, and a translator of the works of Plato and Sextus Empiricus into English.

== Writings ==
Bury's writings, on subjects ranging from ancient Greece to the 19th-century papacy, are at once scholarly and accessible to the layman. His two works on the philosophy of history elucidated the Victorian ideals of progress and rationality which undergirded his more specific histories. He also led a revival of Byzantine history (which he considered and explicitly called Roman history), which English-speaking historians, following Edward Gibbon, had largely neglected. In 1886–88 he published a series of articles on the Frankish domination in Greece. In 1892 he was among the first contributors to Karl Krumbacher's journal Byzantinische Zeitschrift. He contributed to, and was himself the subject of, an article in the 1911 Encyclopædia Britannica. With Frank Adcock and S. A. Cook he edited The Cambridge Ancient History, launched in 1919.

In 1913, Bury wrote A History of Freedom of Thought, a book from the freethinking perspective criticizing Christianity and the Catholic Church as being against reason. In response, Hilaire Belloc wrote an essay exposing numerous historical inaccuracies in the book, and accusing him of not doing original research, but simply "repeating what some other man of the same kind has said before him, and that other man is repeating something that was said before him."

=== History as a science ===
Bury's career shows his evolving thought process and his consideration of the discipline of history as a "science". From his inaugural lecture as Regius Professor of Modern History at Cambridge delivered on 26 January 1903 comes his public proclamation of history as a "science" and not as a branch of "literature". He stated:

I may remind you that history is not a branch of literature. The facts of history, like the facts of geology or astronomy, can supply material for literary art; for manifest reasons they lend themselves to artistic representation far more readily than those of the natural sciences; but to clothe the story of human society in a literary dress is no more the part of a historian as a historian, than it is the part of an astronomer as an astronomer to present in an artistic shape the story of the stars.

Bury's lecture continues by defending the claim that history is not literature, which in turn questions the need for a historian's narrative in the discussion of historical facts and essentially evokes the question: is a narrative necessary? But Bury describes his "science" by comparing it to Leopold von Ranke's idea of science and the German phrase that brought Ranke's ideas fame when he exclaimed "tell history as it happened" or "Ich will nur sagen wie es eigentlich gewesen ist." [I only want to say how it actually happened.] Bury's final thoughts during his lecture reiterate his previous statement with a cementing sentence that argues "...she [history] is herself simply a science, no less and no more".

== Bibliography ==
The Odes of Pindar

- The Nemean Odes of Pindar (1890)
- The Isthmian Odes of Pindar (1892)

Rome

- A History of the Later Roman Empire from Arcadius to Irene (2 vols.) (1889)
- A History of the Roman Empire From its Foundation to the Death of Marcus Aurelius (1893)
- The Imperial Administrative System in the Ninth Century, with a revised text of the Kletorologion of Philotheos (1911)
- A History of the Eastern Roman Empire from the Fall of Irene to the Accession of Basil I (A. D. 802–867) (1912)
- A History of the Later Roman Empire from the Death of Theodosius I to the Death of Justinian (1923)
- The Invasion of Europe by the Barbarians (1928)
- The Life of St. Patrick and His place in History (1905)
- History of the Papacy in the 19th Century (1864–1878) (1930)
- Selected Essays (1930), ed. by Harold Temperley
- Romances of Chivalry on Greek Soil (1911)

Greece

- A History of Greece to the Death of Alexander the Great (1900)
- The Ancient Greek Historians (Harvard Lectures) (1909)
- The Hellenistic Age: Aspects of Hellenistic Civilization (1923), with E. A. Barber, Edwyn Bevan, and W. W. Tarn

Philosophical

- A History of Freedom of Thought (1913)
- The Idea of Progress: An Inquiry into Its Origin and Growth (1920)

=== As editor and annotator ===
- Edward Gibbon, The History of the Decline and Fall of the Roman Empire (2 Editions. 1st Edition: 1896–1900; Revised edition: 1909-14) - 2ND American edition at Online Library of Liberty in 12 volumes
  - J.B. Bury, ed., 2 volumes, 4TH Edition (New York: The Macmillan Company, 1914) Volume 1 Volume 2
- Edward Augustus Freeman, Freeman's Historical Geography of Europe (third edition, 1903)
- Edward Augustus Freeman, The Atlas To Freeman's Historical Geography (third edition, 1903)

== See also ==
- Historiography of the United Kingdom

== Notes ==
Academic offices
Preceded by Robert Yelverton Tyrrell	Regius Professor of Greek at Trinity College Dublin; 1898–1902	Succeeded by John Isaac Beare
Preceded by Lord Acton	Regius Professor of Modern History at the University of Cambridge; 1902–1927	Succeeded by G. M. Trevelyan
