= The New Cambridge Modern History =

Cambridge Historical Book Series

The New Cambridge Modern History replaced the original Cambridge Modern History in an entirely new project with all new editors and contributors. It was published by Cambridge University Press in fourteen volumes between the 1950s and the 1970s. It included a wide range of new scholarship on traditional themes as well as more coverage of science, technology, political ideas, the arts, intellectual history, and the art of warfare. The Shifting Balance of World Forces 1898–1945 brought the chronology down to 1945. The chair of the editorial board was Sir George Norman Clark. The New Cambridge Modern History has been described as "a comprehensive examination of the political, economic, social, and cultural development of the world from 1493 to 1945".

The final volume is a new Historical atlas. Some volumes have appeared in revised editions.

== Volumes published ==
=== I. The Renaissance, 1493–1520 (1957) ===
Sources:

1. The Renaissance, 1493-1520 (G. R. Potter and D. Hay, eds.) 1957 469 pp.

- General Introduction: History and the Modern Historian Sir George Clark
- 1 Introduction Denys Hay
- 2 The face of Europe on the eve of the great discoveries H. C. Darby
- 3 Fifteenth-century civilisation and the Renaissance Hans Baron
- 4 The Papacy and the Catholic Church R. Aubenas
- 5 Learning and education in Western Europe R. Weiss
- 6 The arts in Western Europe
- 6.1. Italy R. Wittkower
- 6.2. Northern Europe L. D. Ettlinger
- 6.3. Spain E. Frankfort
- 6.4. Vernacular literature H. W. Lawton
- 7 The Empire under Maximilian I R. G. D. Laffan
- 8 The Burgundian Netherlands, 1477-1521 C. A. J. Armstrong
- 9 International relations in the West J. R. Hale
- 10 France under Charles VIII and Louis XII R. Doucet
- 11 The Hispanic kingdoms and the Catholic kings J. M. Batista i Roca
- 12 The invasions of Italy Cecilia M. Ady
- 13 Eastern Europe C. A. Macartney
- 14 The Ottoman Empire V. J. Parry
- 15 The New World
- 15.1. Portuguese expansion H. V. Livermore
- 15.2. Spaniards in the New World J. H. Parry
- 16 Expansion as a concern of all Europe E. E. Rich

=== II. The Reformation, 1520–1559 (1958, new ed. 1990) ===
Geoffrey Rudolph Elton, ed.

Introduction to the second edition G. R. Elton
1 The age of the Reformation G. R. Elton
2 Economic change

1. European agriculture Heide Wunder
2. The greatness of Antwerp S. T. Bindoff

3 The Reformation movements in Germany R. W. Scribner
4 The Reformation in Zurich, Strassburg and Geneva E. G. Rupp
5 The Anabaptists and the sects James M. Stayer
6 The Reformation in Scandinavia and the Baltic N Andersen
7 Politics and the institutionalisation of reform in Germany R. W. Scribner
8 Poland, Bohemia and Hungary R. R. Betts
9 The Reformation in France, 1515-1559 F. C. Spooner
10 The Reformation in England G. R. Elton
11 Italy and the papacy D Cantimori
12 The new orders H. O. Evennett
13 The empire of Charles V in Europe H. G. Koenigsberger
14 The Habsburg-Valois wars Maria J. Rodriguez-Salgado
15 Intellectual tendencies

1. Literature Denys Hay
2. Science A. R. Hall

16 Schools and universities Denys Hay
17 Constitutional development and political thought in western Europe G. R. Elton
18 Constitutional development and political thought in the Holy Roman Empire Volker Press
19 Constitutional development and political thought in eastern Europe R. R. Betts
20 Armies, navies and the art of war J. R. Hale
21 The Ottoman Empire, 1520-1566 V. J. Parry
22 Russia, 1462-1584 J. Fennell
23 The New World, 1521-1580 J. H. Parry
24 Europe and the East I. A. Macgregor

=== III. The Counter-Reformation and price revolution, 1559–1610 (1968) ===
R. B. Wernham, ed.

1 INTRODUCTION R. B. Wernham
2 THE ECONOMY OF EUROPE 1559-1609 F. C. Spooner
3 THE PAPACY, CATHOLIC REFORM, AND CHRISTIAN MISSIONS T. M. Parker
4 PROTESTANTISM AND CONFESSIONAL STRIFE T. M. Parker
5 SOCIAL STRUCTURE, OFFICE-HOLDING AND POLITICS J. Hurstfield
6 INTERNATIONAL DIPLOMACY AND INTERNATIONAL LAW G. Mattingly
7 ARMIES, NAVIES AND THE ART OF WAR J. R. Hale
8 THE BRITISH QUESTION 1559-69 R. B. Wernham
9 WESTERN EUROPE AND THE POWER OF SPAIN H. G. Koenigsberger
10 THE AUSTRIAN HABSBURGS AND THE EMPIRE G. D. Ramsay
11 THE OTTOMAN EMPIRE 1566-1617 V. J. Parry
12 POLAND AND LITHUANIA P. Skwarczynski
13 SWEDEN AND THE BALTIC I. Andersson
14 EDUCATION AND LEARNING R. R. Bolgar
15 SCIENCE Marie Boas Hall
16 POLITICAL THOUGHT AND THE THEORY AND PRACTICE OF TOLERATION Miss M. J. Tooley
17 COLONIAL DEVELOPMENT AND INTERNATIONAL RIVALRIES OUTSIDE EUROPE
17.1. AMERICA J. H. Parry
17.2. ASIA AND AFRICA J. B. Harrison

=== IV. The Decline of Spain and the Thirty Years War 1609–48/59 (1970) ===
J. P. Cooper, ed.

1 GENERAL INTRODUCTION J. P. Cooper
2 THE EUROPEAN ECONOMY 1609-50 F. C. Spooner
3 THE EXPONENTS AND CRITICS OF ABSOLUTISM R. Mousnier
4 THE SCIENTIFIC MOVEMENT AND ITS INFLUENCE 1610-50 A. C. Crombie and M. A. Hoskin
5 CHANGES IN RELIGIOUS THOUGHT G. L. Mosse
6 MILITARY FORCES AND WARFARE 1610-48 J. W. Wijn
7 SEA-POWER J. P. Cooper
8 DRAMA AND SOCIETY J. Lough
9 SPAIN AND EUROPE 1598-1621 H. R. Trevor-Roper
10 THE STATE OF GERMANY (to 1618) G. D. Ramsay
11 THE THIRTY YEARS WAR E. A. Beller
12 THE LOW COUNTRIES E. H. Kossmann
13 SWEDEN AND THE BALTIC 1611-54 M. Roberts
14 INTERNATIONAL RELATIONS AND THE ROLE OF FRANCE 1648-60 G. Livet
15 THE SPANISH PENINSULA 1598-1648 J. H. Elliott
16 FRENCH INSTITUTIONS AND SOCIETY 1610-61 R. Mousnier
17 THE HABSBURG LANDS 1618-57 V-L. Tapie
18 THE FALL OF THE STUART MONARCHY J. P. Cooper
19 THE ENDING OF POLISH EXPANSION AND THE SURVIVAL OF RUSSIA

1. POLAND-LITHUANIA 1609-48 H. Jablonowski
2. RUSSIA 1613-45 J. L. H. Keep

20 THE OTTOMAN EMPIRE 1617—48 V. J. Parry
21 EUROPE AND ASIA J. B. Harrison
22 THE EUROPEAN NATIONS AND THE ATLANTIC E. E. Rich
23 LATIN AMERICA 1610-60 W. Borah

=== V. The Ascendancy of France 1648-88 (1961) ===
F. L. Carsten

PREFACE F. L. Carsten
1 INTRODUCTION: THE AGE OF LOUIS XIV F. L. Carsten
2 ECONOMIC PROBLEMS AND POLICIES D. C. Coleman
3 THE SCIENTIFIC MOVEMENT A. R. Hall
4 PHILOSOPHY W. von Leyden
5 POLITICAL THOUGHT S. Skalweit
6 CHURCH AND STATE Anne Whiteman
7 ART AND ARCHITECTURE R. Wittkower
8 THE SOCIAL FOUNDATIONS OF STATES Sir George Clark
9 FRENCH DIPLOMACY AND FOREIGN POLICY IN THEIR EUROPEAN SETTING G. Zeller
10 FRANCE UNDER LOUIS XIV J. Lough
11 THE ACHIEVEMENTS OF FRANCE IN ART, THOUGHT AND LITERATURE David Ogg
12 THE DUTCH REPUBLIC E. H. Kossmann
13 BRITAIN AFTER THE RESTORATION David Ogg
14 EUROPE AND NORTH AMERICA E. E. Rich
15 SPAIN AND HER EMPIRE Juan Reglá
16 PORTUGAL AND HER EMPIRE V. M. Godinho
17 EUROPE AND ASIA

1. THE EUROPEAN CONNECTION WITH ASIA J. B. Harrison
2. THE ENGLISH AND DUTCH EAST INDIA COMPANIES C. D. Cowan

18 THE EMPIRE AFTER THE THIRTY YEARS WAR F. L. Carsten
19 ITALY AFTER THE THIRTY YEARS WAR Giorgio Spini
20 THE HABSBURG LANDS R. R. Betts
21 THE OTTOMAN EMPIRE UNDER MEHMED IV A. N. Kurat
22 SCANDINAVIA AND THE BALTIC J. Rosen
23 THE RISE OF BRANDENBURG F. L. Carsten
24 POLAND TO THE DEATH OF JOHN SOBIESKI H. Jablonowski
25 RUSSIA; THE BEGINNING OF WESTERNISATION Werner Philipp

=== VI. The rise of Great Britain and Russia, 1688–1715/25 (1970) ===
J. S. Bromley, ed.
PREFACE J. S. Bromley
1 INTRODUCTION J. S. Bromley
2 THE SCIENTIFIC MOVEMENT AND THE DIFFUSION OF SCIENTIFIC IDEAS, 1688-1751 A. C. Crombie and Michael Hoskin
3 CULTURAL CHANGE IN WESTERN EUROPE

1. TENDENCIES IN THOUGHT AND LITERATURE W. H. Barber
2. MUSIC, 1661-1752 F W. Sternfeld

4 RELIGION AND THE RELATIONS OF CHURCH AND STATE J. McManners
5 INTERNATIONAL RELATIONS IN EUROPE Andrew Lossky
6 THE ENGLISH REVOLUTION E. S. De Beer
7 THE NINE YEARS WAR, 1688-1697 Sir George Clark
8 THE EMERGENCE OF GREAT BRITAIN AS A WORLD POWER David Ogg
9 WAR FINANCE, 1689-1714 P. G. M. Dickson and John Sperling
10 THE CONDITION OF FRANCE, 1688-1715 Jean Meuvret
11 THE SPANISH EMPIRE UNDER FOREIGN PRESSURES, 1688-1715 Roland Dennis Hussey and J. S. Bromley
12 FROM THE NINE YEARS WAR TO THE WAR OF THE SPANISH SUCCESSION Sir George Clark
13 THE WAR OF THE SPANISH SUCCESSION IN EUROPE A. J. Veenendaal
14 THE PACIFICATION OF UTRECHT H. G. Pitt
15 FRANCE AND ENGLAND IN NORTH AMERICA, 1689-1713 Philip S. Haffenden
16 PORTUGAL AND HER EMPIRE, 1680-1720 V. Magalhaes Godinho
17 THE MEDITERRANEAN Jean Mathiex
18 THE AUSTRIAN HABSBURGS J. W. Stoye
19 THE RETREAT OF THE TURKS, 1683-1730 A. N. Kurat and J. S. Bromley
20.1 CHARLES XII AND THE GREAT NORTHERN WAR Ragnhild Hatton
20.2 THE ECLIPSE OF POLAND J. Gierowski and A. Kaminski
21 RUSSIA UNDER PETER THE GREAT M. S. Anderson
22 ARMIES AND NAVIES

1. THE ART OF WAR ON LAND David G. Chandler
2. SOLDIERS AND CIVILIANS J. W. Stoye

3. NAVIES J. S. Bromley and A. N. Ryan
23 ECONOMIC ACTIVITY

1. THE MAP OF COMMERCE, I683-1721 Jacob M. Price
2. PRICES, POPULATION AND ECONOMIC ACTIVITIES IN EUROPE, I688-1715 Jean Meuvret

=== VII. The Old Regime, 1713–1763 (1957, new ed. 1996) ===
J. O. Lindsay, ed.
1 INTRODUCTORY SUMMARY J. O. Lindsay
2 THE GROWTH OF OVERSEAS COMMERCE AND EUROPEAN MANUFACTURE C. H. Wilson
3 THE SOCIAL CLASSES AND THE FOUNDATIONS OF THE STATES J. O. Lindsay
4 THE VISUAL ARTS AND IMAGINATIVE LITERATURE Sir Albert Richardson
5 THE ENLIGHTENMENT A. Cobban
6 RELIGION R. W. Greaves
7 MONARCHY AND ADMINISTRATION

1. EUROPEAN PRACTICE J. O. Lindsay
2. THE ENGLISH INSPIRATION W. R. Brock

8 THE ARMED FORCES AND THE ART OF WAR Eric Robson
9 INTERNATIONAL RELATIONS J. O. Lindsay
10 THE DECLINE OF DIVINE-RIGHT MONARCHY IN FRANCE A. Cobban
11 ENGLAND W. R. Brock
12 THE WESTERN MEDITERRANEAN AND ITALY J. O. Lindsay
13 THE ORGANISATION AND RISE OF PRUSSIA W. H. Bruford
14 RUSSIA Ian Young
15 SCANDINAVIA AND THE BALTIC R. M. Hatton
16 POLAND UNDER THE SAXON KINGS L. R. Lewitter
17 THE HABSBURG DOMINIONS C. A. Macartney
18 THE WAR OF THE AUSTRIAN SUCCESSION Mark A. Thomson
19 THE DIPLOMATIC REVOLUTION D. B. Horn
20 THE SEVEN YEARS WAR Eric Robson
21 THE DEVELOPMENT OF THE AMERICAN COMMUNITIES

1. LATIN AMERICA J. H. Parry
2. NORTH AMERICA Frank Thistlethwaite

22 RIVALRIES IN AMERICA

1. THE CARIBBEAN J. H. Parry
2. THE NORTH AMERICAN CONTINENT Frank Thistlethwaite

23 RIVALRIES IN INDIA C. C. Davies
24 ECONOMIC RELATIONS IN AFRICA AND THE FAR EAST
24. 1. AFRICA J. Gallagher
24. 2. ASIA Victor Purcell

=== VIII. The American and French Revolutions 1763–93 (1965) ===
A. Goodwin

1 INTRODUCTORY SUMMARY A. Goodwin
2 POPULATION, COMMERCE AND ECONOMIC IDEAS Sir John Habakkuk
3 LITERATURE AND THOUGHT: THE ROMANTIC TENDENCY, ROUSSEAU, KANT W. Stark
4 MUSIC, ART AND ARCHITECTURE

1. MUSIC F. W. Sternfeld
2. ART AND ARCHITECTURE Peter Murray

5 SCIENCE AND TECHNOLOGY Douglas McKie
6 EDUCATIONAL IDEAS, PRACTICE AND INSTITUTIONS A. V. Judges
7 ARMED FORCES AND THE ART OF WAR

1. NAVIES Christopher Lloyd
2. ARMIES J. R. Western

8 EUROPEAN RELATIONS WITH ASIA AND AFRICA

1. RELATIONS WITH ASIA Kenneth Ballhatchet
2. RELATIONS WITH AFRICA J. D. Hargreaves

9 EUROPEAN DIPLOMATIC RELATIONS, 1763-1790 M. S. Anderson
10 THE HABSBURG POSSESSIONS AND GERMANY E. Wangermann
11 RUSSIA I. Young
12 THE PARTITIONS OF POLAND L. R. Lewitter
13 THE IBERIAN STATES AND THE ITALIAN STATES, 1763–1793

1. THE IBERIAN STATES J. Lynch
2. THE ITALIAN STATES J. M. Roberts

14 THE DEVELOPMENT OF THE AMERICAN COMMUNITIES OUTSIDE BRITISH RULE R. A. Humphreys
15 SOCIAL AND PSYCHOLOGICAL FOUNDATIONS OF THE REVOLUTIONARY ERA R. R. Palmer
16 AMERICAN INDEPENDENCE IN ITS CONSTITUTIONAL ASPECTS Max Beloff
17 AMERICAN INDEPENDENCE IN ITS IMPERIAL, STRATEGIC AND DIPLOMATIC ASPECTS M. A. Jones
18 AMERICAN INDEPENDENCE IN ITS AMERICAN CONTEXT: WESTERN EXPANSION Esmond Wright
19 THE BEGINNINGS OF REFORM IN GREAT BRITAIN: IMPERIAL PROBLEMS: POLITICS AND ADMINISTRATION, ECONOMIC GROWTH W. R. Ward
20 FRENCH ADMINISTRATION AND PUBLIC FINANCE IN THEIR EUROPEAN SETTING J. F. Bosher
21 THE BREAKDOWN OF THE OLD REGIME IN FRANCE D. Dakin
22 THE HISTORIOGRAPHY OF THE FRENCH REVOLUTION J. McManners
23 THE OUTBREAK OF THE FRENCH REVOLUTION G. E. Rudé
24 REFORM AND REVOLUTION IN FRANCE: OCTOBER 1789-FEBRUARY 1793 A. Goodwin

=== IX. War and peace in an age of upheaval, 1793-1830 (1965) ===
Charles William Crawley, ed.

1 INTRODUCTION C. W. Crawley
2 ECONOMIC CHANGE IN ENGLAND AND EUROPE, 1780-1830 R.M. Hartwell
3 ARMED FORCES AND THE ART OF WAR

A. ARMIES N. H. Gibbs
B. NAVIES C. Lloyd

4 REVOLUTIONARY INFLUENCES AND CONSERVATISM IN LITERATURE AND THOUGHT H. G. Schenk
5 SCIENCE AND TECHNOLOGY C. C. Gillispie
6 RELIGION : CHURCH AND STATE IN EUROPE AND THE AMERICAS John Walsh
7 EDUCATION, AND PUBLIC OPINION John Roach
8 SOME ASPECTS OF THE ARTS IN EUROPE

A. THE VISUAL ARTS David Thomas
B. MUSIC F. W. Sternfeld

9 THE BALANCE OF POWER DURING THE WARS, 1793-1814 Geoffrey Bruun
10 THE INTERNAL HISTORY OF FRANCE DURING THE WARS, 1793-1814 Jacques Godechot
11 THE NAPOLEONIC ADVENTURE Felix Markham
12 FRENCH POLITICS, 1814-47 G. de Bertier de Sauvigny
13 GERMAN CONSTITUTIONAL AND SOCIAL DEVELOPMENT, 1795-1830 W. H. Bruford
14 THE AUSTRIAN MONARCHY, 1792-1847 C. A. Macartney
15 ITALY, 1793-1830 J. M. Roberts
16 SPAIN AND PORTUGAL, 1793 to c. 1840 Raymond Carr
17 THE LOW COUNTRIES AND SCANDINAVIA

A. THE LOW COUNTRIES J. A. van Houtte
B. SCANDINAVIA T.K. Derry

18 RUSSIA, 1789-1825 J.M.K. Vyvyan
19 THE NEAR EAST AND THE OTTOMAN EMPIRE, 1798-1830 C. W. Crawley
20 EUROPE’S RELATIONS WITH SOUTH AND SOUTH-EAST ASIA K. A. Ballhatchet
21 EUROPE’S ECONOMIC AND POLITICAL RELATIONS WITH TROPICAL AFRICA J.D. Fage
22 THE UNITED STATES AND THE OLD WORLD, 1794-1828 F. Thistlethwaite
23 THE EMANCIPATION OF LATIN AMERICA R. A. Humphreys, O.B.E.
24 THE FINAL COALITION AND THE CONGRESS OF VIENNA, 1813-15 E. V. Gulick
25 INTERNATIONAL RELATIONS, 1815-30 C. W. Crawley

=== X. The zenith of European power 1830–70 (1960) ===
J. P. T. Bury, ed.

1 INTRODUCTORY SUMMARY J. P. T. Bury
2 ECONOMIC CHANGE AND GROWTH Herbert Heaton
3 THE SCIENTIFIC MOVEMENT AND ITS INFLUENCE ON THOUGHT AND MATERIAL DEVELOPMENT A. R. Hall
4 RELIGION AND THE RELATIONS OF CHURCHES AND STATES Norman Sykes
5 EDUCATION AND THE PRESS John Roach
6 ART AND ARCHITECTURE Nikolaus Pevsner
7 IMAGINATIVE LITERATURE Erich Heller
8 LIBERALISM AND CONSTITUTIONAL DEVELOPMENTS J. A. Hawgood
9 NATIONALITIES AND NATIONALISM J. P. T. Bury
10 THE SYSTEM OF ALLIANCES AND THE BALANCE OF POWER Gordon Craig
11 ARMED FORCES AND THE ART OF WAR: NAVIES Michael Lewis
12 ARMED FORCES AND THE ART OF WAR: ARMIES Liddell Hart
13 THE UNITED KINGDOM AND ITS WORLD-WIDE INTERESTS David Thomson
14 RUSSIA IN EUROPE AND ASIA J.M.K. Vyvyan
15 THE REVOLUTIONS OF 1848 Charles Pouthas
16 THE MEDITERRANEAN C. W. Crawley
17 THE SECOND EMPIRE IN FRANCE Paul Farmer
18 THE CRIMEAN WAR Agatha Ramm
19 PRUSSIA AND THE GERMAN PROBLEM, 1830-66 James Joll
20 THE AUSTRIAN EMPIRE AND ITS PROBLEMS, 1848-67 C. A. Macartney
21 ITALY D. Mack Smith
22 THE ORIGINS OF THE FRANCO-PRUSSIAN WAR AND THE REMAKING OF GERMANY Michael Foot
23 NATIONAL AND SECTIONAL FORCES IN THE UNITED STATES D. M. Potter
24 THE AMERICAN CIVIL WAR Harry Williams
25 THE STATES OF LATIN AMERICA R. A. Humphreys
26 THE FAR EAST G. F. Hudson

=== XI. Material Progress and World-Wide Problems 1870–1898 (1962) ===
F. H. Hinsley

1 INTRODUCTION F. H. Hinsley
2 ECONOMIC CONDITIONS Charles Wilson
3 SCIENCE AND TECHNOLOGY Trevor I. Williams
4 SOCIAL AND POLITICAL THOUGHT David Thomson
5 LITERATURE A. K. Thorlby
6 ART AND ARCHITECTURE Sir Nikolaus Pevsner
7 EDUCATION Victor Murray
8 THE ARMED FORCES M. E. Howard
9 POLITICAL AND SOCIAL DEVELOPMENTS IN EUROPE Theodor Schieder
10 THE GERMAN EMPIRE Werner Conze
11 THE FRENCH REPUBLIC J. Nere
12 AUSTRIA-HUNGARY, TURKEY AND THE BALKANS W. N. Medlicott
13 RUSSIA J. L. H. Keep
14 GREAT BRITAIN AND THE BRITISH EMPIRE Paul Knaplund
15 INDIA, 1840-1905 Percival Spear
16 CHINA C. P. FitzGerald
17 JAPAN W. G. Beasley
18 THE UNITED STATES W. R. Brock
19 THE STATES OF LATIN AMERICA Charles C. Griffin
20 INTERNATIONAL RELATIONS A. J. P. Taylor
21 RIVALRIES IN THE MEDITERRANEAN, THE MIDDLE EAST AND EGYPT A. P. Thornton
22 THE PARTITION OF AFRICA R. E. Robinson and J. Gallagher
23 EXPANSION IN THE PACIFIC AND THE SCRAMBLE FOR CHINA F. C. Langdon
24 THE UNITED STATES AND THE OLD WORLD A. E. Campbell

=== XII. The Era of Violence, edited by David Thomson (1960) Second edition, The Shifting Balance of World Forces 1898–1945 (1968) ===
C. L. Mowat

Table of Contents of the Second edition:

1 INTRODUCTORY SURVEY: ON THE LIMITS OF MODERN HISTORY C. L. Mowat
2 THE TRANSFORMATION OF SOCIAL LIFE * David Thomson
3 THE WORLD ECONOMY: INTERDEPENDENCE AND PLANNING * Asa Briggs
4 SCIENCE AND TECHNOLOGY * Douglas McKie
5 DIPLOMATIC HISTORY 1900-1912 * J. P. T. Bury
6 THE APPROACH OF THE WAR OF 1914 * J. M. K. Vyvyan
7 THE FIRST WORLD WAR Brian Bond
8 THE PEACE SETTLEMENT OF VERSAILLES 1918-1933 * Rohan Butler
9 THE LEAGUE OF NATIONS * J. L. Brierly and P. A. Reynolds
10 THE MIDDLE EAST 1900-1945 E. Kedourie
11 INDIA AND SOUTH-EAST ASIA

1. INDIA Percival Spear
2. SOUTH-EAST ASIA * D. G. E. Hall

12 CHINA, JAPAN AND THE PACIFIC 1900-1931 * J. W. Davidson
13 THE BRITISH COMMONWEALTH OF NATIONS * J. C. Beaglehole
14 THE RUSSIAN REVOLUTION * Isaac Deutscher
15 THE SOVIET UNION 1917-1939 George Kennan
16 GERMANY, ITALY AND EASTERN EUROPE Elizabeth Wiskemann
17 GREAT BRITAIN, FRANCE, THE LOW COUNTRIES AND SCANDINAVIA Maurice Crouzet
18 THE UNITED STATES OF AMERICA * Sir Denis Brogan
19 LATIN AMERICA * J. H. Parry
20 LITERATURE 1895-1939 A, E. Dyson
21 PHILOSOPHY AND RELIGIOUS THOUGHT

1. PHILOSOPHY Renford Bambrough
2. RELIGIOUS THOUGHT W. R. Matthews

22 PAINTING, SCULPTURE AND ARCHITECTURE M. E. Cooke
23 DIPLOMATIC HISTORY 1930-1939 D. C. Watt
24 THE SECOND WORLD WAR Sir Basil Liddell Hart
25 DIPLOMATIC HISTORY OF THE SECOND WORLD WAR Sir Llewelyn Woodward

=== XIII. Companion Volume (1979) ===
Peter Burke

=== XIV. Atlas (1970) ===
H. C. Darby & Harold Fullard,
