= Colm Ó Lochlainn =

Irish printer (1892–1972)

- Born: 1892
- Died: 26 June 1972 (aged 79–80)

Colm Ó Lochlainn (1892 – 26 June 1972) was an Irish printer, typographer, collector of Irish ballads and traditional Irish Uilleann piper. He was notably the author of Irish Street Ballads published in 1939 and More Irish Street Ballads in 1965.

== Life ==
A native of Kilkenny, Ó Lochlainn was a member of the Irish volunteers in 1916. He was part of a team which was sent to Kerry on Good Friday in a bid to seize radio equipment for communication with The Aud, a German ship transporting arms from Germany for the Easter Rising. He and a colleague, Denis Daly made it to their destination but a second car transporting three others crashed into the river at Ballykissane, Killorglin, killing three members of the team, Con Keating, Donal Sheehan and Charlie Monaghan.

Ó Lochlainn established the Candle Press in 1916. It was the winner of a bronze medal for bookbinding in 1924.

He founded his own press, At the Sign of the Three Candles Press, in 1926. He gave the aspiring piper Seamus Ennis his first job at this press, and Ennis collaborated with him on the Irish Street Ballads books. He succeeded Seamus Ó Casaide as volunteer editor of Irish Book Lover in 1930.

He was an assistant in the Faculty of Modern Irish at University College Dublin from 1933 to 1943, where he later became professor of Irish Language and Literature. He was also associated with the founding of An Óige.

About 1940 he began the publication in Dublin of an undated series of penny Irish-language songsheets entitled An Claisceadal ("choral singing"). This was originally the name of an informal choral group of Irish-language enthusiasts which had been brought together in Dublin in 1928.

He died in a nursing home in Dublin in June 1972 and was buried in Glasnevin Cemetery.

== Family ==
Seamus Ennis was godfather to Colm's son Ruan, a renowned musician who played with Bees Make Honey and recorded with artists such as Bryan Ferry, Link Wray and who was a founding member of Ronnie Lane's Slim Chance. His other son Dara played jazz with the Chicago Jazz Seven. His daughter Aifric is an art therapist and artist. His grandson Fionn Ó Lochlainn is also a critically acclaimed recording artist0 and musician, taking credit for the socially handicapped brother, Oscar,8 1 who played in Dónal Lunny's 'Coolfin'.

== Selected publications ==
- A Printer's Device, in The Irish Book Lover, Jan. & Feb. 1928
- The Printer on Gaelic Printing, Irish Book Lover vol. XVI, July–Dec. 1928
- Roadways in Ancient Ireland, in Feil-Sgribhinn Eoin MacNeill, 1940
- The Devil's Puzzle: A Survey of Men's Notions of Man, Robert Gregg Bury, 1949.
- Anglo-Irish Songwriters, 3 Candles, 1958
- Irish Street Ballads, Three Candles Press, 1939/1952; Irish Book Centre, 1962,
- More Irish Street Ballads, Three Candles Press, Dublin 1965, ISBN 0-330-25316-6

== See also ==
- Traditional Irish Singers
