= Robert Gregg Bury =

Irish clergyman and classical philologist (1869–1951)

The Reverend Robert Gregg Bury
- Born: 22 March 1869; Clontibret, County Monaghan, Ireland
- Died: 11 February 1951 (aged 81); Cambridge, England
- Occupations: Classicist, clergyman
- Writing career
- Notable works: The Philebus of Plato; The Symposium of Plato; The Fourth Gospel and the Logos-Doctrine

Robert Gregg Bury (/ˈbjʊəri/; 22 March 1869 – 11 February 1951) was an Irish Anglican clergyman, classicist, philologist, and a translator of the works of Plato and Sextus Empiricus into English.

== Early life and education ==
Born in Clontibret, County Monaghan, Ireland, Bury was the son of Edward John Bury, the canon of Clogher, and the brother of John Bagnell Bury, an Irish historian, classical scholar, Medieval Roman historian and philologist. It was pleasantly claimed by neighbors that the only language spoken in the Clontibret presbytery was Greek.

He studied classics under Professor Henry Jackson at Trinity College, Cambridge, winning the Browne Medal Scholar in 1889 and graduating with first-class honours in classics in 1890. He graduated as M.A. in 1893 and received a Litt.D. in 1910.

== Academic career ==
In 1893–94 he was Bishop Berkeley Fellow in Ancient Philosophy at Owens College in Manchester and in 1895 he was appointed lecturer in Greek and Latin Literature at Bryn Mawr College, Pennsylvania, United States. He worked as Examiner in Classical Tripos at Cambridge University in the years 1899–1900 and 1905-6.

== Career as clergyman ==
In 1895 Bury decided to become an Anglican clergyman. He was ordinated as a deacon in that year and as a priest in 1897. From this time onwards "il va consacrer sa vie d'une part au ministère des âmes, d'autre part à la philologie grecque et spécialement à Platon". For several decades he was a curate successively at Staplehurst, Kent (1895–98), in the parish of St Andrew Holborn (1897–99), at Clontibret, County Monaghan (1899–1900), and at Templecarn, County Donegal (1900–01); then a vicar at Trumpington, Cambridgeshire (1903–18); and finally a rector at East Gilling, Yorkshire (1918–24), and at Dickleburgh and Langmere, Norfolk (1924–28).

He then retired and, following the death of his wife in 1934, worked peacefully in Cambridge until his death there in 1951. During these final years he continued to make regular contributions to academic journals such as the Classical Quarterly, Classical Studies, Revue des Études greques, and Revue de philologie.

== Legacy ==
During the earlier part of his life Bury made a name for himself by creating authoritative new editions (with introductions, critical commentaries and notes) for the Cambridge University Press of Plato's Socratic dialogues Philebus and Symposium. Then he composed English translations (again accompanied by commentaries and notes) of Plato's Timaeus, Critias, Cleitophon, Menexenus, Epistles and Laws and of the works of Sextus Empiricus for the bilingual Loeb Classical Library. In late life he turned his mind to other areas of religion and philosophy, penning a study of the logos doctrine in the Gospel of John and study in the history of philosophy with the title of The Devil's Puzzle. A Survey of Men's Notions of Man.

Critics have remarked on the extensive nature of the introductions, commentaries, notes and appendices to be found in Bury's books (for example, the introduction of 75 pages in his Philebus and the 53 pages of notes out of a total of 80 pages in his The Fourth Gospel and the Logos-Doctrine). Most of Bury's translations have been reprinted repeatedly and are still in print today.

Professor Robert B. Todd remarked that "[f]ew British scholars have served Greek philosophical studies as well without holding a formal academic position".

== Personal life ==
In 1894 Bury married Eloise Ives Lanyon (1863–1934). They had one son, John Patrick Tuer Bury (1908–87), who became a fellow and university lecturer in modern history at Corpus Christi College, Cambridge University.

== Gregg Bury Prize ==
The Gregg Bury Prize has been established at the University of Cambridge and is "awarded for a distinguished dissertation on the subject of the Philosophy of Religion". Past recipients have included Malcolm Jeeves, Ian Hacking, Neema Sofaer and K. M. A. (Karim) Esmail.

== Select bibliography ==
=== Books: As editor and commentator ===
- The Philebus of Plato. Edited with Introduction, Notes and Appendices. Cambridge University Press, 1897, online.
- The Symposium of Plato. Edited with Introduction, Critical Notes and Commentary. Cambridge, W. Heffer and Sons, 1909, online.

=== Books: As translator, editor and commentator ===
- Plato in Twelve Volumes: IX. Timaeus. Critias. Cleitophon. Menexenus. Epistles. With an English Translation. Cambridge, Massachusetts, Harvard University Press, 1929 (Loeb Classical Library, 234), online
- Plato, with an English Translation: Volume IX: Laws. In Two Volumes. I. Cambridge, Massachusetts, Harvard University Press, London, William Heinemann, 1926 (Loeb Classical Library, 187), online.
- Plato, with an English Translation: Volume IX: Laws. In Two Volumes. II. London, William Heinemann, New York, G. P. Putnam’s Sons, 1926 (Loeb Classical Library, 192), online.
- Sextus Empiricus. With an English Translation by the Rev. R. G. Bury, Litt.D. In Four Volumes.
  - Vol. I: Outlines of Pyrrhonism. Cambridge, Massachusetts, Harvard University Press, London, William Heinemann, 1933 (Loeb Classical Library, 273), online
  - Vol. II: Against the Logicians. Cambridge, Massachusetts, Harvard University Press, London, William Heinemann, 1935 (Loeb Classical Library, 291), online
  - Vol. III: Against the Physicists. Against the ethicists. Cambridge, Massachusetts, Harvard University Press, London, William Heinemann, 1936 (Loeb Classical Library, 311)
  - Vol. IV: Against the Professors. Cambridge, Massachusetts, Harvard University Press, London, William Heinemann, 1949 (Loeb Classical Library, 382)

=== Books: As critic ===
- The Fourth Gospel and the Logos-Doctrine. Cambridge, W. Heffer & Sons, 1940.
- The Devil's Puzzle: A Survey of Men's Notions of Man. Dublin, At the Sign of the Three Candles Press, 1949. Introduction by Shane Leslie.

=== Articles ===
- "The Later Platonism", in: Journal of Philology, vol. 23 (1895), pp. 161–201.
- Review of R. K. Gaye, The Platonic Conception of Immortality, in: The Classical Review, vol. 19 (1905), pp. 160–62.
- "Theory of education in Plato's « Laws »", in: Revue des Études greques, Volume 50 (1937), Numéro 236, pp. 304–320.
