= J. P. T. Bury =

British historian (1908–1987)

- Born: John Patrick Tuer Bury; 30 July 1908; Trumpington, England
- Died: 10 November 1987 (aged 79); Cambridge, England
- Parent: Robert Gregg Bury (father)
- Relatives: J. B. Bury (uncle)

Academic background
- Education: Corpus Christi College, Cambridge

Academic work
- Institutions: Corpus Christi College, Cambridge
- Main interests: French history

John Patrick Tuer Bury (/ˈbjʊəri/; 30 July 1908 – 10 November 1987), known as J. P. T. Bury, was a British historian of modern France. He was Fellow at Corpus Christi College at Cambridge University (1933–1987). Following appointment as Lecturer in History in 1937, he served as a member of the History Faculty until his retirement in 1975. He specialized in modern French political history.

== Life ==
He was born in Trumpington to Robert Gregg Bury and educated at Marlborough College and Corpus Christi College, Cambridge, where he studied history. He was elected to a Fellowship of the college in 1933, an office he held until 1987. He was appointed successively Director of Studies in History, Dean of college, Librarian, Steward of Estates and Warden of Leckhampton House.

During the Second World War he worked for the Ministry of Supply and the Research Department of the Foreign Office.

Bury's historical work focused on the French Third Republic and he produced a three volume biography of the nineteenth century French statesman Léon Gambetta. He was also editor of the tenth volume of The New Cambridge Modern History and The Historical Journal. He was joint editor of ten volumes of Documents on British Foreign Policy 1919–1939.

== Works ==
- Gambetta and the National Defence: A Republican Dictatorship in France (London: Longmans, Green and Company, 1936).
- France 1814–1940 (London: Methuen & Co., 1949; 2nd ed. 1950; 3rd ed. 1954; 4th ed. 1969; 5th ed. 1985).
- Napoleon III and the Second Empire (English Universities Press, 1964).
- Gambetta and the Making of the Third Republic (London: Longman, 1973).
- Gambetta's Final Years: 'The Era of Difficulties', 1877–1882 (London: Longman, 1982).
- Thiers, 1797–1877: A Political Life, co-authored with Robert Tombs (London: Allen & Unwin, 1986).
