= Narbonne Commune =

Insurrectionary commune in France in 1871

- Formation: March 24, 1871
- Dissolved: March 31, 1871
- Type: Insurrectionary commune
- Purpose: Communalism
- Location: France
- Leader: Émile Digeon
- Key people: Baptiste Limouzy

The Central Commune of the Narbonne arrondissement (Commune centrale de l'arrondissement de Narbonne), or more commonly, the Narbonne Commune (Occitan: Comuna de Narbona), is the name given to the popular insurrection and revolutionary administration established in Narbonne between March 24 and 31, 1871, comparable to other Communes of the same type during the same period in France.

== Context ==
Even before 1871, Narbonne was a town with a strong Republican tradition. In the 1870 constitutional referendum, the population voted “no” by 1,917 votes to 1,494, while the national vote for Napoleon III was over 80%.

On March 12, 1871, Émile Digeon, a journalist with La Fraternité in Carcassonne and a Republican deported to Algeria following the coup d'état of December 1851, spoke at the Revolution Club. In front of an audience of 2,000, he gave a revolutionary socialist speech, calling for the arming of the National Guard and the adoption of the red flag.

News of the Paris insurrection on March 18, 1871, triggered a wave of solidarity within the Revolution Club, which then attempted to involve the town in the revolutionary movement. If the revolutionaries in Narbonne wanted to establish the Commune, they initially thought they could do so without insurrection, by exerting political pressure on the town council. On March 23, a petition was drafted for the town council at a meeting attended by 1,600 people, calling for recognition of Paris's authority against Versailles, and the immediate arming of the National Guard. However, the municipal council refused to debate the motion proposed by Baptiste Limouzy, the only member of the club to sit on the municipal council.

This left Narbonne's fervent republicans with no other option than insurrection. To achieve this, the Revolution Club sent Digeon a letter the very same day, urging him to go to Narbonne “in order to proclaim the central Commune of the arrondissement, with union to the government of Paris.” He arrived on the evening of the 23rd, and immediately went to the Lamourguier church to make a speech to the people of Narbonne. However, the following day, events were set in motion by the Narbonne Republicans alone.

== The Commune ==
Political unrest took a revolutionary turn on March 24, when the mayor authorized the National Guard commander to distribute rifles to the national guards.

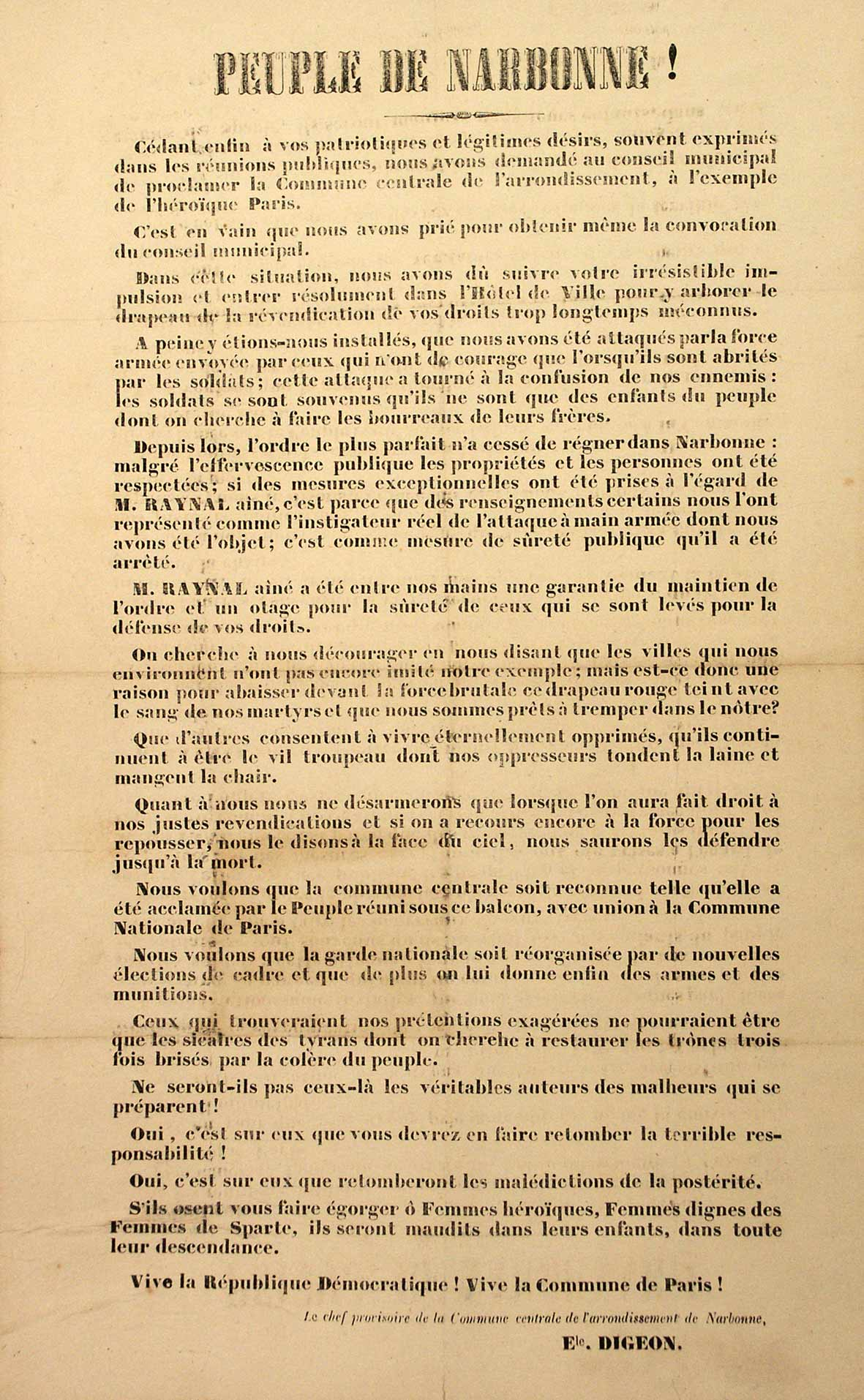
Poster from the Narbonne Commune, addressed to the “People of Narbonne”, signed by Émile Digeon, “ Provisional Leader of the Commune of the Narbonne arrondissement ”, March 30, 1871.

The town hall was invaded by the people of Narbonne on the evening of March 24, in a spontaneous insurrection. Revolutionary militants did not let themselves be overwhelmed, and accompanied the movement: Émile Digeon soon arrived, accompanied by several members of the Revolution Club. Once the general arming of the population was assured, Digeon climbed to the balcony of the town hall and announced the “constitution of the central Commune of the Narbonne arrondissement, with union to the one in Paris”. The red flag was adopted as the symbol of popular aspirations, while the tricolor flag was rejected.

The communalists quickly put together a new administration. Digeon proposed a list of members for the new government, amended according to the acclamations and refusals of the Narbonnais assembled in the town hall square. It was composed as follows:

- Émile Digeon, journalist (provisional leader)
- Baptiste Limouzy, gardener (chairman)
- Prosper Nègre, librarian
- Barthélémy Noël, National Guard commander
- Eugène Gondres, commercial representative
- Auguste Bouniol, wine merchant
- Arthur Conche, bookseller
- Victor Grasset, baker.

The next day, the 1,500 soldiers of the 52nd infantry regiment stationed in Narbonne put their rifle butts in the air, shouting “Vive la commune” (“Long live the commune”), and allowed themselves to be disarmed by the crowd. The Communards took their two officers and Raynal, deputy mayor, hostage. The Commune was now in control of the town: Prosper Nègre and 40 guards took possession of the sub-prefecture in the name of the people, while Digeon took possession of the station and telegraph, and ordered the stationmaster and telegraph station manager to recognize only the authority of the Commune.

== Suppression ==
Troops under the Versailles command of General Zentz arrived at Narbonne station on the night of March 29–30.

Once the insurrection in Narbonne was suppressed, judicial repression followed. It was severe in the army, intended to make an example of soldiers who had defected to the revolution: 203 soldiers were arrested, most of whom were sent to disciplinary battalions; 19 were brought before a council of war and sentenced to death. These sentences were commuted to forced labor for life and served in New Caledonia until the 1879 and 1880 amnesties .

The 44 civilians were tried at the Rodez trial. Their trial opened on November 13, 1871, at the Rodez courthouse. They were accused of being part of an armed group, “which carried out an attack aimed at destroying or changing the government, and inciting civil war, by leading citizens or inhabitants to arm themselves against each other.” The debates lasted until November 18. After an hour and a half of deliberation, the Communards were absolved, thanks in particular to the testimony of the hostages, including Captain Blondlat of the 52nd Line, who insisted on the exemplary treatment they received from the insurgents.

== See also ==
- Paris Commune
- Lyon Commune
