= Raphaël Granier de Cassagnac =

French physicist and writer

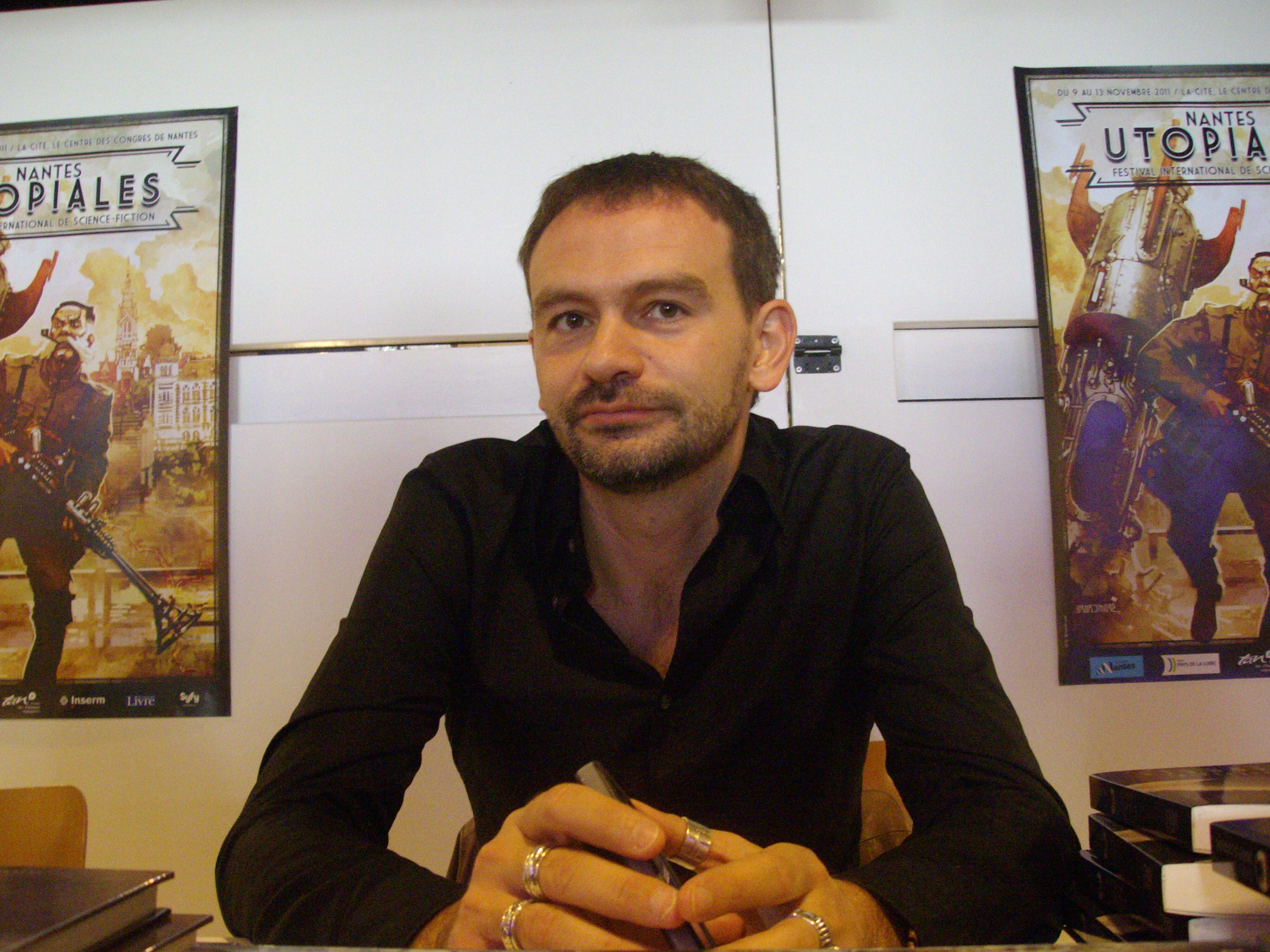
Raphaël Granier de Cassagnac at Utopiales 2011

Raphaël Granier de Cassagnac (born 1 January 1973 in Paris) is a French physicist and writer.

== Career ==
=== Research ===
He is specialized in nuclear and particle physics. He is a member of the PHENIX experiment at Brookhaven National Laboratory and of the CMS experiment at CERN where he is involved in studying the Quark-Gluon Plasma in ultrarelativistic heavy-ion collisions.

=== Writing ===
He writes science fiction novels. His debut novel was Eternity Incorporated, published in 2011. It was followed by Thinking Eternity in 2014 which won the Prix du Lundi in 2014.

== Personal life ==
Ahead of the 2024 French legislative election, he co-signed a statement with other figures from French speculative fiction in support of a New Popular Front against the far-right.
