= Paul Adolphe Marie Prosper Granier de Cassagnac =

French newspaper founder (1842–1904)

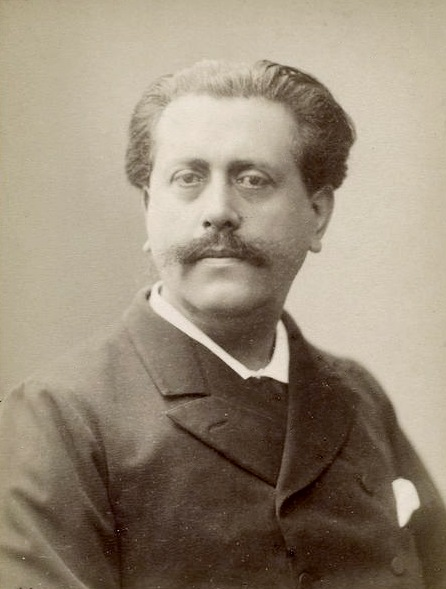
Photograph of Paul Cassagnac

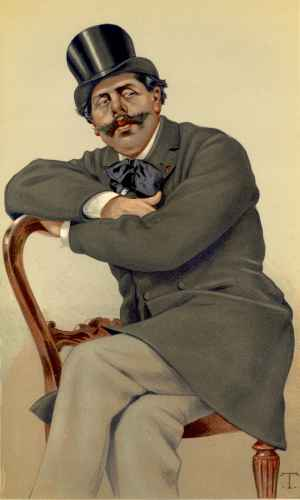
Painting of Cassagnac by Chartran, 1879

Paul Adolphe Marie Prosper Granier de Cassagnac (2 January 1843, Paris – 4 November 1904, Saint-Viâtre) was the son of Adolphe Granier de Cassagnac and Rosa de Beaupin de Beauvalon, and while still young associated with his father in both politics and journalism. In 1866 he became editor of the Conservative paper Le Pays, and figured in a long series of political duels. On the declaration of war in 1870 he volunteered for service and was taken prisoner at Sedan.

On his return from captivity in a fortress in Silesia he continued to defend the Bonapartist cause in Le Pays, against both Republicans and Royalists. Elected deputy for the department of Gers in 1876, he adopted in the chamber a policy of obstruction "to discredit the republican régime". In 1877 he openly encouraged MacMahon to attempt a Bonapartist coup d'état, but the marshal's refusal and the death of the Prince Imperial foiled his hopes. Afterwards he played but a secondary role in the chamber, and occupied himself mostly with the direction of the journal L'Autorité, which he had founded. He was not re-elected in 1902, and died in November 1904. His sons took over L'Autorité and the belligerent traditions of the family.

His cousin, with whom he had numerous feuds, was Prosper-Olivier Lissagaray; Adolphe Granier de Cassagnac's mother, Ursule (1775–1850) was a sister of Lissagaray's father Laurent.
