= Adolphe Granier de Cassagnac =

French journalist and politician (1806–1880)

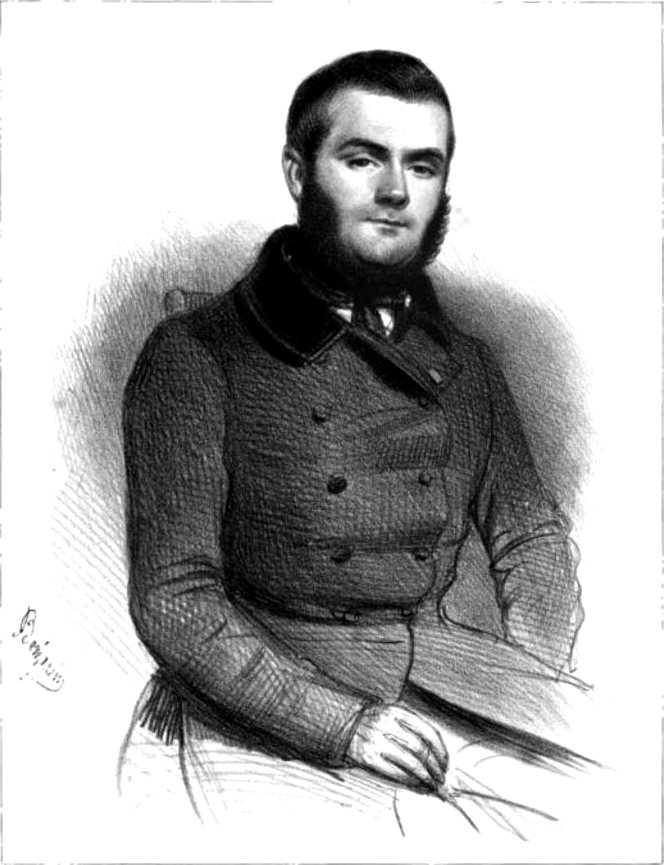
Adolphe Granier de Cassagnac

Bernard Adolphe Granier de Cassagnac (12 August 1806 – 31 January 1880) was a French journalist and politician.

== Biography ==
Born in Avéron-Bergelle, département of Gers, to gentleman glassmaker Pierre-Paul Granier de Cassagnac (1771-?) and Ursule (née Lissagaray; 1775-1850), from 1818 to 1828 he lived with the family of his mother's brother, Laurent Prosper Lissagaray, whose son, Prosper-Olivier, was a journalist.

He began his career as a Parisian journalist in 1832, contributing defences of Romanticism and Conservatism to the Revue de Paris, the Journal des Débats, and to La Presse. Then he founded a political journal, L'Epoque (1845–1848), and his violent polemics in support of François Guizot brought him notoriety and some duels.

In 1851, in Le Constitutionnel, he declared himself openly an advocate of the French Empire, and in 1852 was elected as official candidate by the département of Gers to the Second Republic's National Assembly. As journalist and deputy he actively supported an absolutist policy, and also demanded the restoration of Roman Catholicism as state religion, opposed the laws in favor of the press, and was a member of the club of the rue de l'Arcade - the political allies of Louis-Napoléon Bonaparte.

In March 1868 he accused the Liberal deputies of having received money from Wilhelm I of Prussia for opposing Bonaparte, and, when called upon for proof, submitted only false or trivial documents.

After the Empire's defeat in the Franco-Prussian War and the proclamation of the Third Republic (4 September 1870), Granier de Cassagnac fled to Belgium, and returned to France for the elections of 1876, and was elected deputy. He continued to combat all the republican reforms, but without electoral success.

== Family ==
In 1841 he married Rosa de Beaupin de Beauvalon, daughter of a wealthy Creole planter; his son Paul Adolphe Marie Prosper Granier de Cassagnac followed in his footsteps as a belligerent journalist.
