= French civil war =

French Civil War may refer to:

- the war culminating in the Battle of Soissons (923)
- Armagnac–Burgundian Civil War (1407–1435)
- War of the Public Weal (1465)
- Mad War (1485–1488)
- French Wars of Religion (1562–1598)
- The Fronde (1648–1653)
- French Revolutionary Wars
  - Chouannerie (1792–1800)
  - War in the Vendée (1793–1796)
- Chouannerie of 1832
- French civil war of 1871, including the Paris Commune
- the conflict between Vichy France and Free France during World War II (1940–1945), including the
  - Battle of Dakar
  - Battle of Réunion
  - Battle of Gabon
  - French Resistance
- Algerian War (1954–1962)

== See also ==
- The Civil War in France, pamphlet by Karl Marx about the Paris Commune
