= Robert Tombs =

British historian (born 1949)

ODPA Robert Tombs
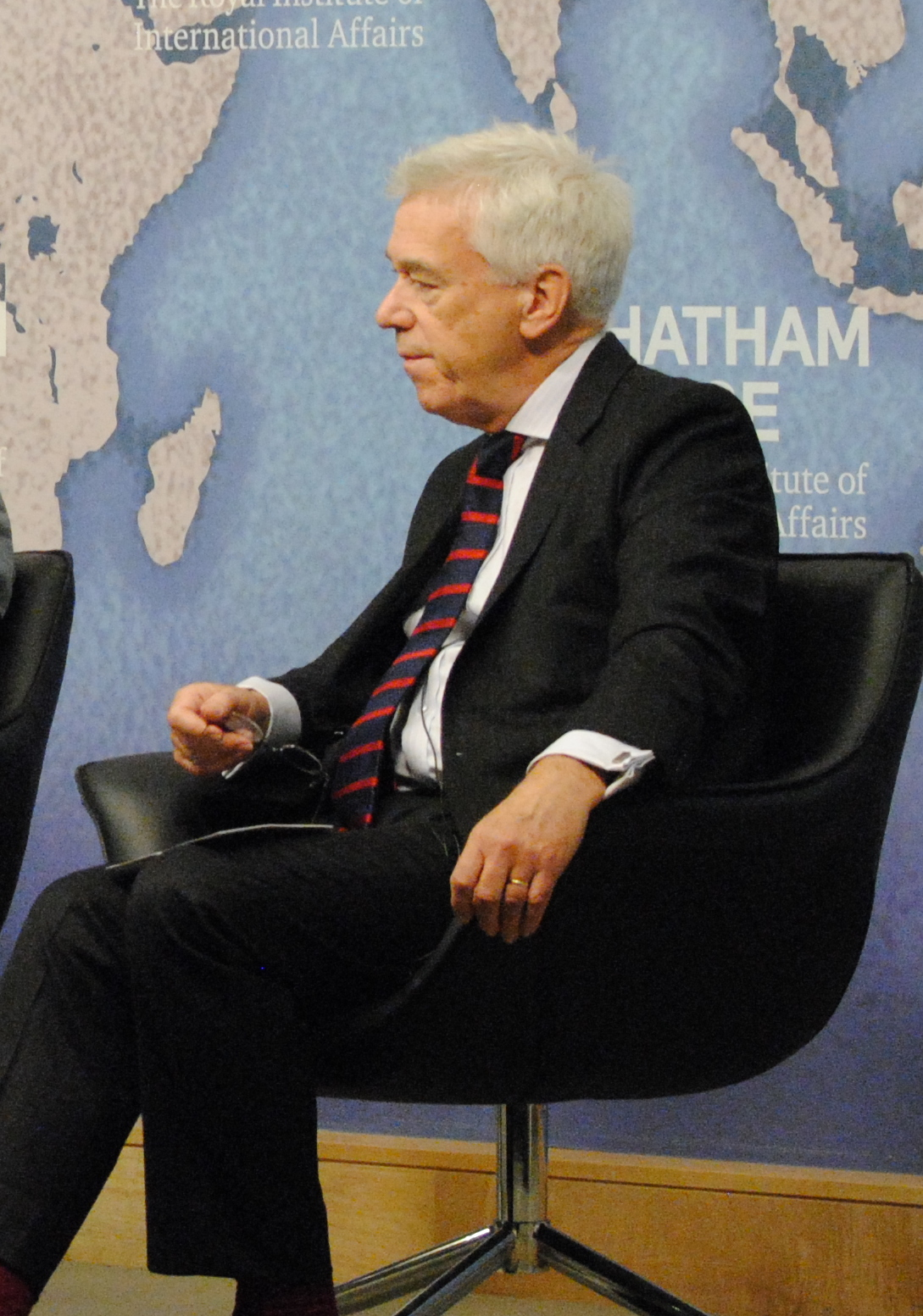
- Tombs in 2016
- Born: Robert Paul Tombs; 8 May 1949 (age 77); England
- Citizenship: British, French
- Occupations: Academic, historian
- Spouse: Isabelle Tombs (née Bussy)
- Awards: Ordre des Palmes académiques (2007)

Academic background
- Education: University of Cambridge (BA, PhD)
- Thesis: The Forces of Order and the Suppression of the Paris Insurrection of 1871 (1978)

Academic work
- Institutions: St. John's College, Cambridge
- Main interests: Franco-British relations, political history of France (19th century)
- Notable works: That Sweet Enemy (2006), The English and Their History (2014)

Robert Paul Tombs (born 8 May 1949) is a British-French historian of France and Britain. He is professor emeritus of French history at the University of Cambridge and a fellow of St John's College, Cambridge. Prior to this, he was a reader in the subject until 2007. Tombs is the recipient of the Ordre des Palmes académiques awarded by the French government.

Tombs is known for his work on French history, particularly the Paris Commune, as well as Franco-British relations and, more recently, English history. He is the author of several books, including The War Against Paris, 1871 (1981), France 1814–1914 (1996), That Sweet Enemy: The French and the British from the Sun King to the Present (2006, co-authored with Isabelle Tombs), and The English and Their History (2014).

He is noted for his Francophile scholarship, as well as for his contributions to public debates on Brexit, British national identity, and historical memory.

== Early life ==
Tombs was born in England. He was educated at St Chad's College for Boys, Wolverhampton (now the co-educational Our Lady and St Chad Catholic Academy), and Trinity Hall, Cambridge, where he read history. He stayed on at Cambridge to complete a PhD in modern French history, conducting much of his research in France, and graduated in 1978 with a thesis on the response of the French state to the Paris Commune in 1871. Tombs studied French at school but mainly learned the language by travelling to France, "getting jobs, making friends, and learning on the spot."

== Academic career ==
Following his PhD, Tombs embarked on a research fellowship at St John's College, Cambridge. He was then appointed a fellow of St John's and awarded a junior lectureship in the Faculty of History, University of Cambridge. He has since held various Faculty and College posts, and served as co-editor of The Historical Journal.

Tombs's speciality is 19th-century France, focusing primarily on the political culture of the working classes. His first book, The War Against Paris, 1871 (which was adapted from his PhD thesis), analysed the role of the French Army in the suppression of the Paris Commune, and challenged a number of myths associated with that period.

In 2006, along with his wife, Tombs wrote That Sweet Enemy: The French and the British from the Sun King to the Present, a history of the relationship between Britain and France. The book received considerable media coverage in the United States, France, and the United Kingdom. It became critical when discussing Franco-British relations, and helped establish Tombs and his work in political, diplomatic, and policy circles. Following the publication of the book, the French government awarded Tombs in October 2007 the Ordre des Palmes académiques for "services rendered to French culture", and Tombs was appointed to the Franco-British Council in 2008. In 2014, Tombs published The English and Their History, which was widely reviewed by the popular press.

Tombs's retirement was announced in August 2016, after which he became professor emeritus. Tombs is the editor of History Reclaimed, a website created by a "group of anti-woke scholars" that opposes what they claim to be censorship of historical texts in universities including Nigel Biggar, Zareer Masani, and Andrew Roberts.

== Personal life ==
Tombs is a dual national, holding British and French citizenship. His wife Isabelle Tombs (née Bussy) was born in France, and is in charge of French training at the Foreign and Commonwealth Office. He is co-editor of Briefings for Brexit, a consortium of academics and educators who support Brexit, and has written columns for newspapers such as The Daily Telegraph, The Spectator, and The Times. In the 1975 United Kingdom European Communities membership referendum, Tombs voted in support of membership.

In November 2021, Tombs expressed strong support for the retention of the English Wikipedia article "Mass killings under communist regimes", then facing the prospect of deletion on neutrality and original research grounds. Tombs wrote that "attempts to remove it can only be ideologically motivated – to whitewash Communism."

== Major books ==
- — The War Against Paris, 1871 (1981). Cambridge: Cambridge University Press. 256 pp.
- — with Bury, J. P. T. (1986). Thiers 1797–1877: A Political Life. London: Allen & Unwin. 307 pp.
- — ed. (1991). Nationhood and Nationalism in France: From Boulangism to the Great War 1889–1918. London: Harper Collins. 286 pp.
- — France 1814–1914 (1996). London: Longman. 590 pp.
- — The Paris Commune, 1871 (1999). London: Longman. 244 pp.
- — Cross-Channel Currents: 100 Years of the Entente Cordiale (2004). London: Routledge.
- — with Tombs, Isabelle (2006). That Sweet Enemy: The French and the British from the Sun King to the Present. London: W. Heinemann. 780 pp.
- — with Chabal, Emile (2013). Britain and France in Two World Wars: Truth, Myth and Memory. London: Bloomsbury.
- — Paris, bivouac des révolutions. La Commune de 1871 [Paris, Bivouac of Revolutions. The Commune of 1871] (2014). Paris: Libertalia (in French).
- — The English and Their History: The First Thirteen Centuries (2014). London: Penguin. 875 pp.
- — This Sovereign Isle (2020). London: Allen Lane. 224 pp.

== See also ==
- Besançon Commune
- Dictionnaire biographique du mouvement ouvrier français
- Histoire de la Commune de 1871
- Prosper-Olivier Lissagaray
- Jean Maitron
- Pétroleuses
- Jacques Rougerie (historian)
