= Henry Kistemaeckers (publisher) =

Belgian publisher

- Born: c. 1851
- Died: 1934

Henry Kistemaeckers (c. 1851–1934) was a Belgian publisher and the father of the playwright Henry Kistemaeckers.
