= Battle of Courbevoie =

1871 battle during the Paris Commune

- Part of the Paris Commune
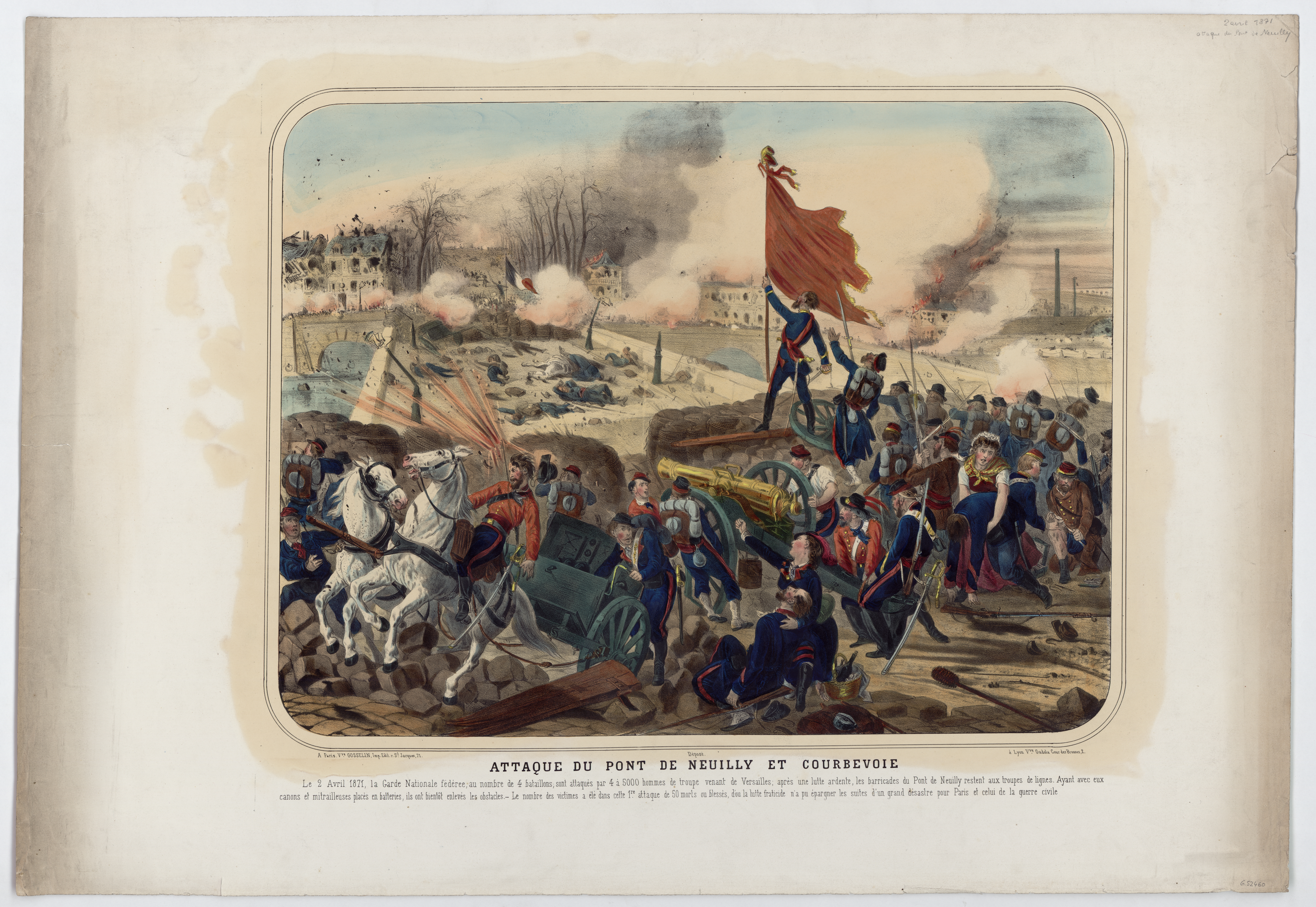
Date	April 2, 1871
Location	Courbevoie, France
Result	French victory

Belligerents
France (Versaillais)	Paris Commune (Communards)

Commanders and leaders
Joseph Vinoy; Émile Bruat; Martin Daudel; Gaston de Galliffet	Unknown

Strength
9,000	500–600

Casualties and losses
5 killed 21 wounded	17 killed 25 captured

The Battle of Courbevoie was the first battle of the 1871 Paris Commune.

== Skirmish ==
Two days into the Commune, on 30 March, exploratory Versaillais troops arrived at a Communard post on the approaches of Courbevoie, near Neuilly-sur-Seine. The troops hesitated when General Gaston Galliffet ordered them to fire. Galliffet charged on horseback, taking prisoners as the Commune retreated. This rallying of pro-government troops made the soldiers more willing to fire on fellow Frenchmen. President Adolphe Thiers, reassured, ordered their return without attempting to capture more Communards.

== Battle ==
Galliffet returned with two brigades on 2 April to attack Courbevoie's Rond-Point. A Versaillais military surgeon general, attempting to negotiate, was killed on approach by Communards who mistook his uniform for that of a colonel. A battle ensued.

The Versaillais won the battle and took Courbevoie. When government forces fell back, some Communards mistakenly believed their side was victorious. The Versaillais had captured 30 Communards, five of whom became the first to be summarily executed.

== Impact ==
Communards who fell back to Paris reported on Joseph Vinoy's orders for all those captured to be shot. In response, the Council of the Commune ordered a sortie counterattack. Later on April 2, the Commune informed the National Guard that the Versaillais had provoked civil war. The Versaillais' willingness to execute Communards marked a turning point for the Communards, convincing them that Thiers would use unrestricted warfare and that Paris must be defended.

The death of the military surgeon general was used in Versaillais propaganda.

== Bibliography ==
- Merriman, John M. (2014). Massacre: The Life and Death of the Paris Commune of 1871. Yale University Press. ISBN 978-0-300-21290-7.
