= Fort d'Issy =

- Part of Fortifications of Paris
- Issy-les-Moulineaux in France
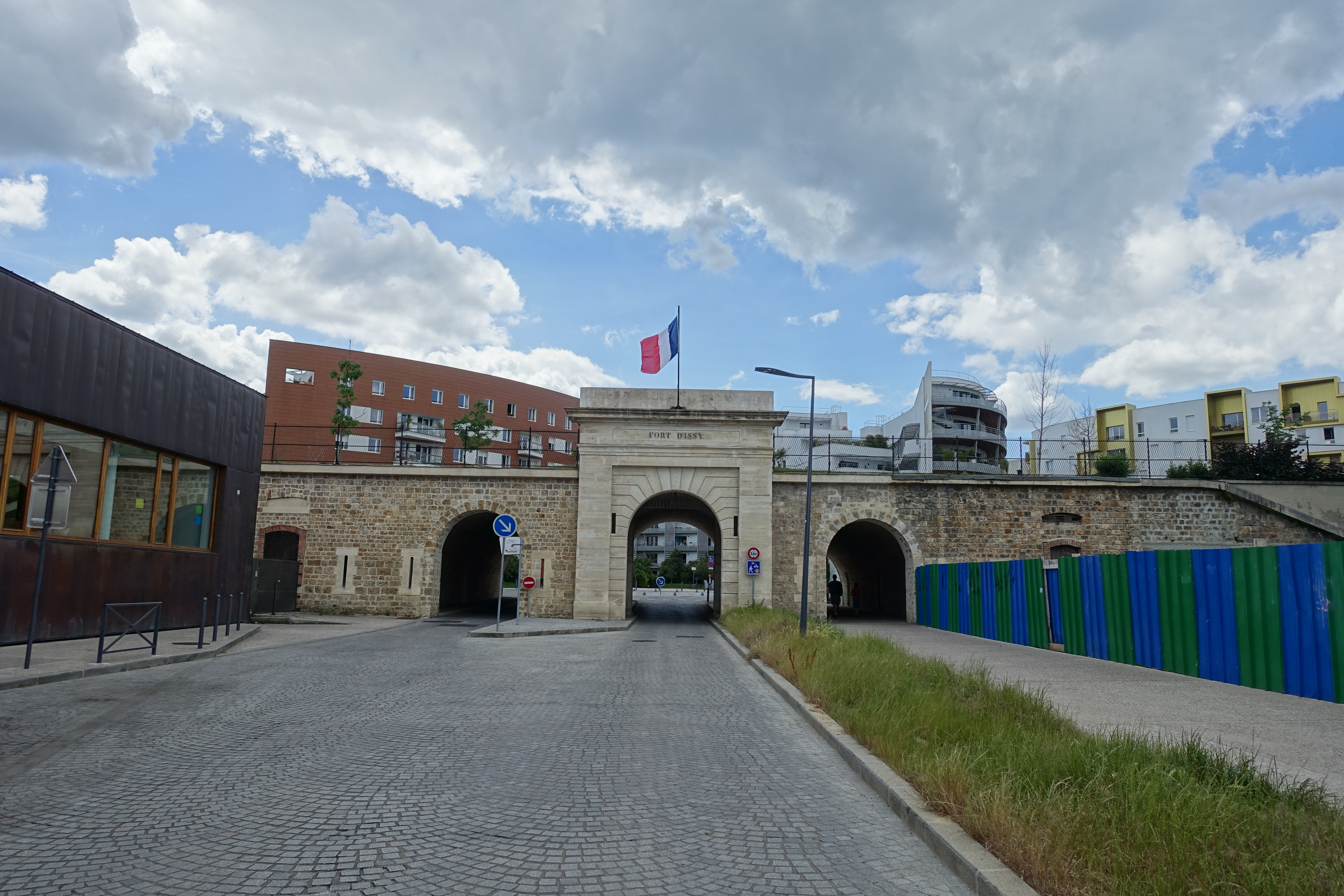
- Entrance to Fort d'Issy

Site information
- Type: Fort
- Open to the public: yes

Location
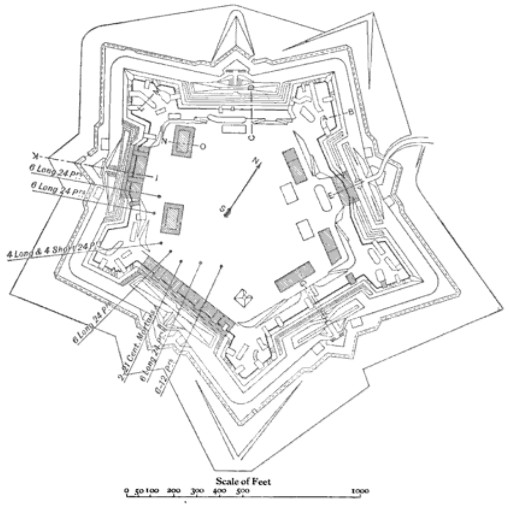
- Plan of Fort Issy around 1870
- Location to the south of Paris
- Coordinates: 48.817176°N 2.268391°E

Site history
- Materials: Stone, brick
- Fate: Obsolete
- Battles/wars: Siege of Paris

Fort d'Issy was one of the fortifications of the city of Paris, France, built between 1841 and 1845. It was one of six forts built to the south of the main wall around the city. The fort was placed too close to the city to be effective, and had a poor design that did not take into account recent experience of siege warfare. It was quickly silenced during the Franco-Prussian War of 1870–71. After the armistice of February 1871 the fort was defended by National Guards of the Paris Commune against the French regular army in April–May 1871. The defense was irresolute and the fort was soon occupied. Today the site of the fort is an "eco-district", an ecologically friendly residential area.

== Background ==
In 1814 and 1815 Paris was twice occupied by a coalition of British, Austrian, Russian and Prussian forces at the end of the Napoleonic Wars. After the restoration of the Bourbon monarchy, and particularly after the July Monarchy came to power in 1830, there was growing demand for construction of fortifications around Paris. Tension rose during the Oriental Crisis of 1840. Prime Minister Adolphe Thiers was authorized by the cabinet in September 1840 to begin construction of the defense system, and was given funding. General Guillaume Dode de la Brunerie was appointed overall director of the program. A continuous wall would encircle the city, protected by detached forts. After debates over the plans in Parliament, a law of 3 April 1841 approved funding for the project and defined a clear zone (zone Non ædificandi) around the walls. The Thiers fortifications were built between 1841 and 1845.

== Location ==
Fort Issy was located on the heights overlooking Issy-les-Moulineaux and Paris. It commanded the Seine. It was the furthest west of a line of six detached forts that defended the south of Paris. Each fort was large and powerful, with high escarps, large interiors and ample accommodation for their garrisons. However, they were so close to the enceinte of Paris that they served as outworks rather than independent forts. The decision about where to place the southern line of forts may have been influenced by the fact that in 1815 Field Marshal Blucher had arrived on the Issy and Vanves heights, overlooking Paris.

The planners ignored the observation in 1840 by General Noizet that even the smooth-bore guns of that time could bombard Paris from the Châtillon plateau further to the south. The planners considered that the Châtillon hills to the south of the fort, with their scattered villages, parks and country houses, was out of range. However, a besieger could place his batteries on the wooded and irregular heights without interference from the forts. The long-range rifled guns of 1870, placed on elevated parts of the hills, could easily reach the fort and the city.

== Structure ==
Fort Issy was typical of the detached forts surrounding Paris, and presumably represented consensus on the ideal fortification. The neighboring forts at Vanves and Montrouge were very similar, but had a square plan. The fort was given a geometrical form in which the bastions included all standard elements, the tennaille, (Note: A tennaille was an outwork in front of a curtain wall that provided a parapet for defense of the ditch by musketry, and protected a space in front of the curtain from which the defenders could make sorties against besiegers trying to storm a breach.) ravelin (Note: A ravelin is a smaller fortification outside the fort's curtain wall, between the curtain and the ditch.) , redoubt of the covered way (Note: The "covered way" was a passage about 11 metres (36 ft) wide between the glacis and the edge of the counterscarp, about 2.5 metres (8 ft 2 in) below the crest of the glacis. It allowed movement of troops between the defensive works outside the ditch.) and so on. All the faces were the same despite the fact that an attack from the area between the fort and the walls of Paris could only be done by parties of infantry who had infiltrated between the forts.

The revetments were very exposed and could easily have been breached by a siege train of the type used by Wellington at the Siege of Ciudad Rodrigo in 1812. At the time of the siege of Paris the fort, including detached outworks, mounted 64 guns. The effective range of the guns was about 3,500 metres (11,500 ft). The fort was an expensive structure that was very vulnerable to siege batteries, and that exposed long faces to enfilade fire.

== Siege of Paris ==
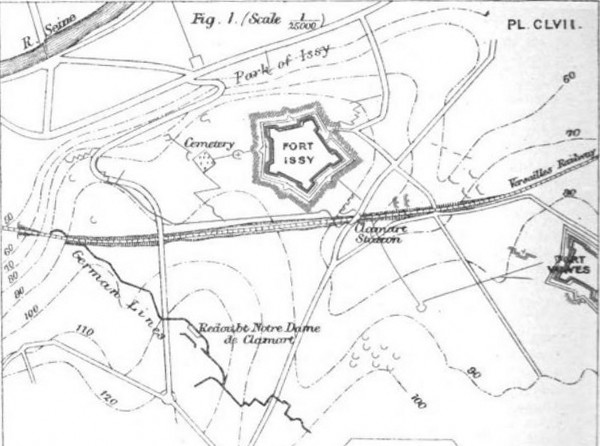
Fort d'Issy surroundings during the Siege of Paris. The German line is in the southwest of the map

The Franco-Prussian War began on 19 July 1870. On 2 September 1870 Napoleon III ordered surrender at the Battle of Sedan. Two days later the mob in Paris declared a republic, with General Louis-Jules Trochu as provisional head of government. The Siege of Paris began on 18 September 1870 when the Prussians encircled the city, and would last for five months. On 16 December 1870 two companies advanced from Fort Issy to occupy the village of Meudon. They encountered Prussian outposts, lost five casualties and retreated. When they were ready, the Germans had little difficulty in silencing the Paris forts.

The Prussian artillery opened its bombardment on 5 January 1871. It continued for 22 days. On 6 January the fire from Fort Issy was temporarily silenced. On 7–8 January the revetments and buildings inside the fort started to be demolished, while the fort's return fire was feeble. The Prussians also directed fire against targets inside Paris. On 11 January the barracks in Fort Issy were set on fire. Three of the four barracks in the interior of the fort were burnt and one was breached and made uninhabitable. By 14 January 1871 Fort Issy had almost stopped firing. On 16 January a Prussian battery began to demolish the casemates in the fort. On 25 January 1871 the French tried to build earthworks in and around Fort Issy under cover of fog, but were stopped.

By the end of the bombardment the powder magazines had not been breached, although in one place the arch was exposed. 5 of the 19 casemates in the southwest curtain had been breached and the others damaged by fire from the short 24 pounder guns. 17 guns were dismounted. The embrasures had been destroyed. The Germans did not attempt systematic breaching operations, so the damage to the fort was caused by random shots. However, the "Park Battery" of Issy, outside the fort, was very hard to hit, and it was impossible to silence a mortar battery behind the railway embankment between Fort Issy and Fort Vanves. The guns outside the fort had proved to be more secure than those within it.

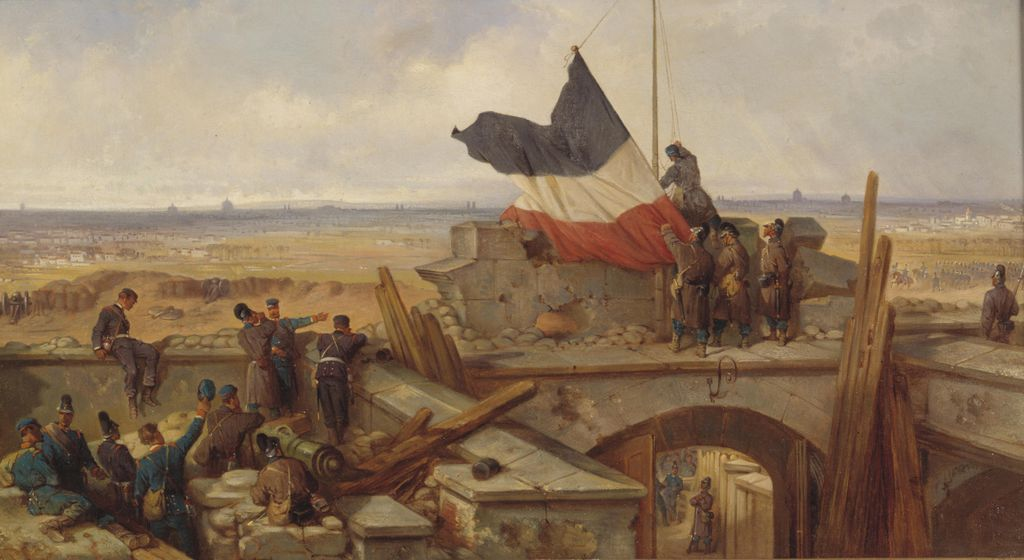
Hoisting the German Flag at Fort Vanves on 29 January 1871 by Eugen Adam

During the bombardment the garrison of Fort Issy suffered on average 8 casualties per day. The greatest number of casualties in one day was three killed and eight wounded, but there were also losses from desertion. Bad mounting of the guns, poor gunnery and poor overall handling of the forts' artillery, meant that on the entire southern front the Germans lost just 50 men killed and 281 wounded, while they fired about 60,000 rounds.

King William of Prussia accepted the title of Emperor on 18 January 1871 in a ceremony in the Hall of Mirrors of Versailles. A three-day armistice was declared on 28 January 1871, under which all the Paris forts would be surrendered and the main enceinte disarmed. On the morning of 29 January Fort Issy was occupied by the Prussian V corps. In February 1871 Adolphe Thiers, head of the French national government, signed an armistice with Otto von Bismarck, Prime Minister of Prussia. The agreement was ratified by the National Assembly in March 1871 and in May 1871 signed as the Treaty of Frankfurt.

== Paris Commune ==
In March 1871 there was mounting tension between the conservative National Assembly and the working class Parisians. On 18 March 1871 an attempt by the government to remove cannons from the hill of Montmartre triggered riots and the National Assembly withdrew to the suburb of Versailles. Soon after the radical Paris Commune was formed. Civil war began when Thiers ordered the dissolution of the Paris National Guard, which was largely composed of working-class volunteers. The Communards fought the superior forces of the Versailles army for control of Paris throughout April and May 1871.

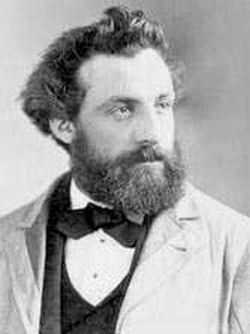
Edmond Mégy, who commanded the fort under the Commune

Edmond Mégy was a militant railway engineer who had influence among the workers and was seen by the Blanquists as a reliable man of action. Mégy had shot dead a policeman who tried to arrest him for conspiracy. He was defended at his trial in Blois in August 1870 by Eugène Protot (1839–1921) and saved from the death sentence on a technicality. Instead he was sentenced to 15 years hard labour. He managed to obtain his freedom, and after trying to start uprisings in Bordeaux and Marseille returned to Paris on 13 April 1871. He was promoted to colonel and given command of Fort d'Issy on 18 April 1871.

The Versailles army had huge resources to overcome Fort Issy, including 53 batteries of guns, 60 naval guns, 70 battalions of infantry, cavalry, gendarmes and chasseurs, 10 engineer companies and a large reserve. General Ernest Courtot de Cissey sent a message to Colonel Mégy, with the permission of Marshal Patrice de MacMahon, offering to spare the lives of the fort's defenders, and let them return to Paris with their belongings and weapons, if they surrendered the fort. On the evening on 26 April 1871 the army attacked Issy-les-Moulineaux, which commanded the road from the fort to Billancourt Island on the Seine, with an intensive bombardment. Inside the fort a company of utterly demoralized engineers refused to continue their work and the next morning the 92nd insisted on being relieved. The fort was almost ruined.

On the morning on 29 April 1871 Mégy telegraphed that the fort had been outflanked on the right and could not be held without a reinforcement of 2,000 men. General Gustave Paul Cluseret told him to wait for reinforcements, but Mégy telegraphed that he was spiking the guns and evacuating the fort, which he did without delay. He appeared at headquarters in Paris soon after. Mégy claimed he had left the fort because he had only seventeen men left, but he had left a man with orders to blow the fort up. Meanwhile, the Communard generals Cluseret and Napoléon La Cécilia reached Issy, where a battalion of about 200 men were occupying the village. The generals led them back to the fort, which the besiegers had not yet occupied since they suspected it was mined. When Cluseret returned to the city he was arrested. The fort was held for several more days.

In May 1871 Raymond Adolphe Séré de Rivières directed the 2nd Corps of the Army of Versailles in the sieges of Fort d'Issy, Fort de Vanves and Fort de Montrouge. The army resumed the intense bombardment of Fort d'Issy. The army troops dug a trench through the Park of Issy between the fort and the city, and then sapped from this trench towards the north salient. The defenders abandoned the fort before the sap could reach the covered way. The fédérés abandoned Fort Issy on 8 May 1871 after fighting for two weeks. Fort Vanves fell on 13 May. The Versailles forces could now cause even greater damage to Paris and its defenses with gunfire from Forts Issy and Vanves.

MacMahon's army worked its way systematically forward to the walls of Paris. On 20 May 1871 MacMahon's artillery batteries at Montretout, Mont-Valerian, Boulogne, Issy, and Vanves opened fire on the western neighborhoods of the city. Early in the morning of 22 May 1871 the Versailles army entered Paris by four gateways near the northwestern side of the Seine. South of the river engineers of De Cissey's troops broke through the fortifications at the Sèvres entrance. The defenders seem to have abandoned these defenses due to the heavy bombardment from Fort Issy and elsewhere. After bitter fighting the Commune was finally defeated by the government troops late in May 1871. The civil war left a legacy of profound distrust between the right and the left in France.

== Later history ==
In 1871 Henri Félix Emmanuel Philippoteaux and his son Paul Philippoteaux produced a cyclorama depicting The Defence of the Fort d'Issy. This was a panoramic painting on the inside of a large cylinder designed to provide a viewer standing in the middle of the cylinder with a 360° view of the painting. The painting was three dimensional, with different canvasses and landscaping details, and was meant to immerse the viewer in the battle scene.

The fortifications were not needed during World War I (1914–18), and the wall was pulled down in 1919. The Boulevard Périphérique today marks the general course of the wall. Several of the forts survived, and became centers for more modern military installations. The Ministry of Defense occupied Fort Issy until the early 2000s. The 12 hectares (30 acres) site was acquired by the city of Issy-les-Moulineaux in 2006. The site was fully demilitarized in 2009.

== Eco-district ==
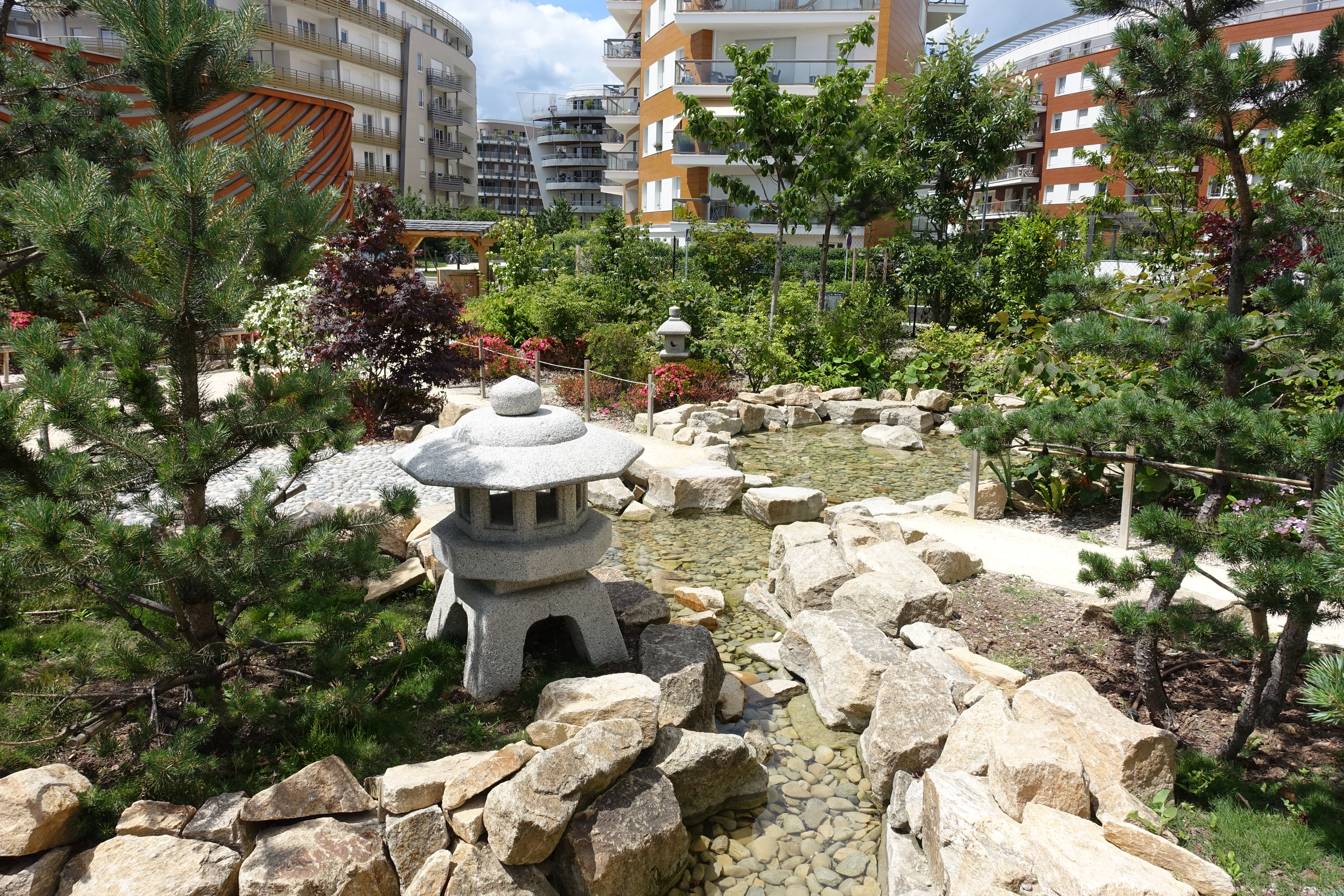
Japanese garden in the eco-district

The fort was returned to civilian use in 2009, and the town began a major project to build a "digital eco-district". The eco-district was completed in 2013. It contains 1,623 dwellings of which 330 are social housing, a 3,267 square metres (35,170 sq ft) bowling alley, 2,300 square metres (25,000 sq ft) of shops and public facilities, two schools, a swimming pool and a multi-use space, Le Temps des Cerises . The buildings are surrounded by trees, walks, squares and playgrounds. An underground network is used for waste collection.

The buildings are rated BBC (Bâtiment Basse Consommation: Low Consumption Building) and use thermal insulation and renewable geothermal heat to minimise CO_{2} emissions. The complex uses a geothermal heat network with two wells over 600 metres (2,000 ft) deep that reach the Early Cretaceous Albian aquifer. The Albian has a temperature of 28 °C (82 °F), which is ideal for low-temperature heat networks like that of Fort d'Issy. One well, almost 650 metres (2,130 ft) deep, is used to pump up the water to a heat exchange substation. The water, now with a temperature of about 13 °C (55 °F), is returned in full to the aquifer by a well 635 metres (2,083 ft) deep. The two wells are 580 metres (1,900 ft) apart at their feet to avoid thermal recycling, and the system is sealed to prevent any contamination of the water. Within the buildings heat pumps deliver water at 35 °C (95 °F) to heat the floors and hot tap water at 60 °C (140 °F).

== Sources ==
- A. M. (1 August 2014), "La lente naissance d'un quartier au fort d'Issy", Les Echos (in French)
- Cannon, James (2016-02-24), The Paris Zone: A Cultural History, 1840-1944, Taylor & Francis, ISBN 978-1-317-02172-8
- Clarke, George Sydenham (1890), Fortification: Its Past Achievements, Recent Development, and Future Progress, J. Murray
- Cordillot, Michel (2002), La sociale en Amérique: dictionnaire biographique du mouvement social francophone aux Etats-Unis, 1848–1922 (in French), Editions de l'Atelier, ISBN 978-2-7082-3543-4
- Dorsch, Michael (2017-07-05), "French Sculpture Following the Franco-Prussian War, 1870?0 ": Realist Allegories and the Commemoration of Defeat, Taylor & Francis, ISBN 978-1-351-56641-4
- "Eco-quartier du Fort d'Issy-Les-Moulineaux (Hauts de Seine)", Géothermie Perspectives (in French), 23 June 2014
- Fort d'Issy (in French), Bouygues Immobilier
- Geva, Dorit (2013-08-12), Conscription, Family, and the Modern State: A Comparative Study of France and the United States, Cambridge University Press, ISBN 978-1-107-32850-1
- Groeling, Meg (16 July 2012), Drawing the War, Part 6: Paul Philippoteaux
- Hutton, Patrick H. (1981), The Cult of the Revolutionary Tradition: The Blanquists in French Politics, 1864–1893, University of California Press, ISBN 978-0-520-04114-1
- Issy.com, L'Éco-Quartier du Fort d'Issy (in French)
- Jellinek, Frank (2013-04-16), The Paris Commune of 1871, Read Books Limited, ISBN 978-1-4474-8662-6
- Kerper, Barrie (2011-07-12), Paris: The Collected Traveler, Knopf Doubleday Publishing Group, ISBN 978-0-307-73932-2
- Le Poil, Constant (1880), Les Jésuites sous la troisième République: 29 mars-29 juin-14 juillet (in French), Librairie générale
- Lewis, J. F., ed. (1893), Text Book of Fortification and Military Engineering ..., H.M. Stationery Office / Royal Military Academy (Great Britain)
- March, Thomas (1896), The History of the Paris Commune of 1871 ..., S. Sonnenschein & Company, Limited
- Merriman, John (2014-12-09), Massacre: The Life and Death of the Paris Commune, Basic Books, ISBN 978-0-465-05682-8
- Michaud, M. (1855), Biographie universelle, ancienne et moderne, ouvrage rédigé par une société de gens de lettres. Michaud, [and E. Desplaces]. (in French)
- Milza, Pierre (2009), L'année terrible: La Commune (mars–juin 1871) (in French), Paris: Perrin, ISBN 978-2-262-03073-5
- Officer of the Royal Engineers (1844), "Fortification", The technical educator, an encyclopædia
- Opération de géothermie intermédiaire à l’Albien pour le quartier du Fort Numérique d’Issy-les-Moulineaux(92) (PDF) (in French), ADEME: Agence de l'Environnement et de la Maîtrise de l'Energie
- Séguin, Leo (1872), "The Ministry of War Under the Commune", The Fortnightly, Chapman and Hall
- Tiedemann, Benno von (1877), The Siege Operations in the Campaign Against France, 1870–71, Her majesty's stationery office
- Tyler, Major E.S. (1876), "The New Works for the Defence of Paris", Journal of the Royal United Service Institution, W. Mitchell and Son
- Vaubourg, Julie, "Le général Raymond Adolphe Séré de Rivières", La fortification Séré de Rivières (in French)
