= Histoire de la Commune de 1871 =

History book by Prosper-Olivier Lissagaray

- Title page
- Author: Prosper-Olivier Lissagaray
- Subject: French history
- Publisher: Henry Kistemaeckers
- Publication date: 1876
- Pages: 516
- OCLC: 21174247

Histoire de la Commune de 1871 ("History of the Paris Commune of 1871") is a history of the Paris Commune by Prosper-Olivier Lissagaray. Published in 1876, it is the event's definitive eyewitness assessment. It was later translated into English and German.

== Publication ==
Lissagaray participated in the Paris Commune and, in popular myth, had been called the "last man on the barricades". Exiled in London after the fall, Lissagaray started on his history. He first published a short sketch of what would become his Histoire at the end of 1871, entitled Les huit journée de mai derrière les barricades, with Le Petit Journal in Brussels. It was first published by Henry Kistemaeckers in 1876. Lissagaray's father-in-law, Karl Marx, was a strong advocate for the work's translation into German and pursued a potential simultaneous release in the language. Marx considered the book the "first authentic" account of the event and was involved in vetting the German translator despite previously having ill will towards Lissagaray. After reviewing a sample translation, they chose Isolde Kurz for the German translation.

The book was translated and released in German in 1878 and republished in 1891 and 1894. The English translation released in 1886. Its translator, Eleanor Marx, and Lissagaray were previously engaged. After publishing the book, Lissagaray was estimated to have worked on revising the book with new research, material, and writing for the next 25 years. His definitive edition was released in 1898. Lissagaray died in 1901.

== Legacy ==
Histoires became the definitive eyewitness assessment of the Paris Commune. Lissagaray became known for the work.

== Bibliography ==
- Aubery, Pierre (1971). "Review of Histoire de la Commune de 1871". The French Review (in French). 44 (3): 581–582. ISSN 0016-111X. JSTOR 386659.
- Lutfalla, Michel (1967). "Review of Histoire de la Commune de 1871". Revue d'économie politique (in French). 77 (6): 897–898. ISSN 0373-2630. JSTOR 24693467.
- Kapp, Yvonne (2018). Eleanor Marx: A Biography. Verso Books. ISBN 978-1-78663-595-2.
- McCracken, Scott (2016). "The Commune in Exile: Urban Insurrection and the Production of International Space". In Bristow, Joseph; McDonagh, Josephine (eds.). Nineteenth-Century Radical Traditions. Springer. pp. 113–136. ISBN 978-1-137-59706-9.
- "Review of Histoire de la commune de 1871, Lissagaray". Historische Zeitschrift (in German). 41 (3): 553. 1879. ISSN 0018-2613. JSTOR 27592996.
- "Review of Histoire de la commune de 1871, Lissagaray". Esprit (1940–) (in French). 147 (8): 256. 1948. ISSN 0014-0759. JSTOR 24251746.
- Zwirn, Jacques (1965). Lissagaray; Winock, M.; Azéma, J.-P.; Rougerie, Jacques (eds.). "Ouvrages Recents sur la Commune de Paris". Revue française de science politique (in French). 15 (5): 995–996. ISSN 0035-2950. JSTOR 43114936.
