= Prosper-Olivier Lissagaray =

French journalist and socialist (1838–1901)

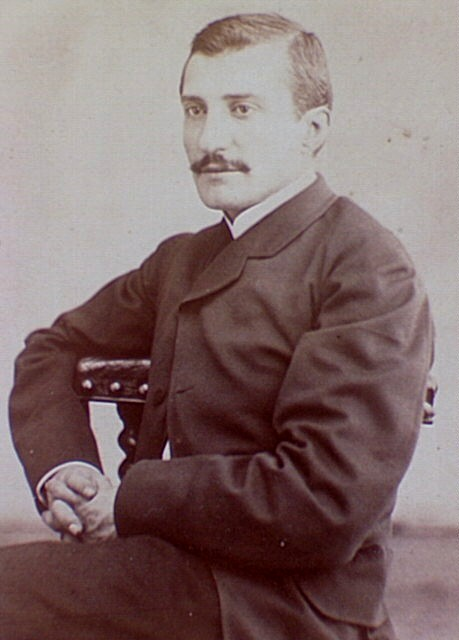
Prosper-Olivier Lissagaray

Hippolyte-Prosper-Olivier "Lissa" Lissagaray (November 24, 1838 – January 25, 1901) was a French literary lecturer and speaker, a Republican journalist and a revolutionary socialist. He is known for his History of the Paris Commune of 1871, an event in which he participated.

== Biography ==
Lissagaray was born in Toulouse to pharmacist Laurent Prosper Lissagaray and Marie-Louise Olympe Boussès de Foucaud. On his father's side, his great-grandfather was a landowner and farmer of 200 hectares, and his grandfather a doctor. The journalist Paul de Cassagnac was a cousin of Lissagaray, with whom he had a fractious relationship; his father's mother, Ursule (1775–1850), was the sister of Laurent Prosper Lissagaray. Disagreement over financial matters related to Ursule's dowry led to the poor relationship between the Lissagarays and Cassagnacs after Laurent Prosper Lissagaray's death.

Lissagaray is known for his investigation of History of the Paris Commune of 1871, an event in which he participated. He collected testimonies from the survivors in exile in London, Switzerland and consulted all documents available at the time to ensure accuracy. He was assisted by Karl Marx in the writing of History of the Paris Commune of 1871, which was translated to English by Eleanor Marx. The current English translation is from the first edition dating in 1876. The French edition is based on the 1896 version.

Exiled in London from 1871 to 1880, he stayed in the house of the Marx family, although he was not personally liked by Mrs Marx, her daughter Laura or her husband Paul Lafargue. Eleanor "Tussy" Marx, the youngest daughter of Karl Marx, fell in love with "Lissa", 17 years older. Because of his young Tussy's depression, her father accepted the engagement between Tussy and Lissa. But at age 25, shortly after the death of her mother, Eleanor decided to break up with Lissa. He retained a strong resentment against Paul and Laura Lafargue. He had a relationship with a marchioness in the 1890s, but afterwards remained single.

He died in Paris in 1901.

== Publications ==
=== Journal and articles ===
- Avenir du Gers, creator et redactor in chief, 1868
- Le Réveil, director, 1868
- La Réforme de Vermorel, collaborator, 1869
- La Marseillaise, creator with Henri Rochefort, 1870
- L’Action, creator et redactor in chief, under the Commune, 1871
- Le Tribun du peuple, creator et redactor in chief, under the Commune, 1871
- La Bataille, redactor in chief, 1881 to 1889
- La Grande Bataille, redactor in chief, 1893
- La Revue blanche, numéro 92 de la huitième année, t.XII, enquête sur la commune, avril 1897, p219 and 356.

=== Bibliography ===
- Alfred de Musset devant la jeunesse, éd. Cournol, Paris, 37p., 1864.
- Jacques Bonhomme – Entretiens de politique primaire, éd A. Le Chevalier, Paris, 224p. 1870 on ligne in Gallica
- Catéchisme républicain, 1870.
- Huit journées de mai derrière les barricades, rééd. Gallimard, Paris, 128p., 1968 / first parution : éd Bureau du petit journal, Bruxelles, 327p., 1871 en ligne sur Gallica
- Vision de Versailles, Paris, 31p. 1873 on line in Gallica
- Rouge et noir (samedi 24 octobre, n°1, vendredi 20 novembre, n°2, 128p., Paris, 1874
- L'histoire de la commune de 1871/History of the Paris Commune of 1871, rééd. La Découverte, 526p., 2004 / First publication in 1876 / Extended publication, éd Dentu, Paris, 1896 on line in Gallica/Trans. by Eleanor Marx

(in English) Prosper Olivier Lissagaray, "History of the Paris Commune of 1871", Red and Black Publishers, St Petersburg, Florida, 2007. ISBN 978-0-9791813-4-4.

- Plus d’Angleterre, Anonyme, 1887.
- Le bilan de Boulanger, Sté des Droits de l'homme et du citoyen, Paris, 25p., 1888.

== Bibliography ==
- Bidouze, René (1991). Lissagaray la plume et l'épée [Lissagaray the pen and the sword] (in French). Éditions ouvrières, Collection La part des hommes.
