= Brian Clegg (writer) =

English science writer (born 1955)

- Born: 1955 (age 70–71)
- Education: Cambridge University; Lancaster University; University of Buckingham
- Occupation: Science writer
- Website: www.brianclegg.net

Brian Clegg (born 1955) is an English science writer. He is the author of popular science books on topics including light, infinity, quantum entanglement and surviving the impact of climate change, and biographies of Roger Bacon and Eadweard Muybridge.

== Biography ==
Born in Rochdale, Lancashire, Clegg was educated at Manchester Grammar School and went on to read Natural Science (specialising in experimental physics) at the University of Cambridge. After graduating, he spent a year at Lancaster University where he gained a second MA in Operational Research, a discipline originally developed during the Second World War to apply the power of mathematics to warfare. It has since been widely applied to problem solving and decision making in business.

From Lancaster, he joined British Airways, where he formed a new department tasked with providing all PC hardware, software and consultancy to the airline. When this was successfully running, he set up BA's Emerging Technologies Group, which researched and trialled technologies from fingerprint recognition to electronic cash. This emphasis on innovation led to training with Dr. Edward de Bono, and in 1994 he left BA to set up his own creativity consultancy, running courses on the development of new ideas and products, and the creative solution of business problems. His clients include the BBC, the Met Office, British Airways, GlaxoSmithKline, Sony, Royal Bank of Scotland and many other blue-chips.

Clegg is a regular speaker and has spoken at a range of venues, from Oxford and Cambridge universities, the Dana Centre at London's Science Museum and his local Swindon Philosophical Society. His book A Brief History of Infinity was launched with a sell-out lecture at the Royal Institution in London. He is also a regular contributor to both radio and TV programmes and writes regular columns, features and reviews for numerous magazines and newspapers, including PC Week, Computer Weekly, Personal Computer World, BBC History Magazine, Good Housekeeping, Chemistry World, Physics World, Nature, Playboy, The Wall Street Journal, The Times, The Observer and House Beautiful.

Clegg's 'Ecologic' won the 2009 IVCA Clarion Award, while 'A Brief History of Infinity' and 'Dice World' have been on the longlist for the Royal Society's book prize. In 2013, he was featured as a question on the BBC quiz show University Challenge and also appeared in the Christmas edition of the show, representing Lancaster University alongside actor Roger Ashton-Griffiths, presenter Ranvir Singh and food writer Matthew Fort.

His book, Are Numbers Real?: the Uncanny Relationship between Maths and the Physical World, was published by Robinson on 2 February 2017.It was published by St. Martin's Press in December 2016 in the United States. Publishers Weekly calls it an "entertaining and accessible look at the numbers we take for granted every day." Kirkus Reviews states: "Solid as a straightforward chronology of how mathematics has developed over time, and the author adds a provocative note urging scientists to keep it in its place."

In 2025 Clegg was awarded an honorary DSc from the University of Buckingham.

Clegg lives in Wiltshire with his wife and twin children.

== Science books ==
- Biomimetics: How Lessons from Nature can Transform Technology (1st ed.). Icon Books. 2023. ISBN 978-1785789892.
- Ten Days in Physics that Shook the World: How Physicists Transformed Everyday Life. Icon Books. 2021. ISBN 978-1785787478.
- How it All Works: All Scientific Laws and Phenomena Illustrated and Demonstrated. Ivy Press. 2021. ISBN 978-0711256781.
- Essential Science. Welbeck. 2020. ISBN 978-1787394469.
- Professor Maxwell's Duplicitous Demon: The Life and Science of James Clerk Maxwell. Icon Books. 2019. ISBN 978-1785784958.
- Scientifica Historica : How the world's great science books chart the history of knowledge. Ivy Press. 2019. ISBN 978-1-78240-878-9.
- Gravitational Waves: How Einstein's spacetime ripples reveal the secrets of the universe. Icon Books. 2018. ISBN 978-1785783203.
- Are Numbers Real? the Uncanny Relationship of Mathematics and the Physical World. St. Martin's Press. 2017. ISBN 978-1250081049.
- How Many Moons Does the Earth Have?. Icon Books. 2015. ISBN 978-1-84831-928-8.
- Ten Billion Tomorrows. St Martin's Press. 2015. ISBN 978-1-250-05785-3.
- Science for Life. Icon Books. 2015. ISBN 978-1-84831-818-2.
- Final Frontier: The Pioneering Science and Technology of Exploring the Universe. St. Martin's Press. 2014. ISBN 978-1-250-03943-9.
- The Quantum Age. Icon Books. 2014. ISBN 978-1-84831-664-5.
- Extra Sensory. St. Martin's Press. 2013. ISBN 978-1-250-01906-6.
- Dice World: Science and Life in a Random Universe. Icon Books. 2013. ISBN 978-1-84831-516-7.
- Gravity: How the Weakest Force in the Universe Shaped Our Lives. St. Martin's Press. 2012. ISBN 978-0-312-61629-8.
- Introducing Infinity. Icon Books. 2012. ISBN 978-1-84831-406-1.
- The Universe Inside You. Icon Books. 2012. ISBN 978-1-84831-353-8.
- Exploring the Universe. Vivays Publishing. 2012. ISBN 978-1-908126-16-0.
- How to Build a Time Machine. St. Martin's Press. 2011. ISBN 978-0-312-65688-1. UK edition: Build Your Own Time Machine. Duckworth Publishing. 2012. ISBN 978-0-7156-4290-0.
- Inflight Science. Icon Books. 2011. ISBN 978-1-84831-241-8.
- Armageddon Science. St Martin's Press. 2010. ISBN 978-0-312-59894-5.
- Before the Big Bang. St Martin's Press. 2009. ISBN 978-0-312-68028-2.
- Ecologic. Eden Project Books. 2009. ISBN 978-1-905811-25-0.
- Upgrade Me. St Martin's Press. 2008. ISBN 978-0-312-37157-9.
- Getting Science. Routledge. 2007. ISBN 978-0-415-42199-7.
- The Global Warming Survival Kit. Doubleday. 2007. ISBN 978-0-385-61260-9.
- The Man Who Stopped Time. Joseph Henry Press. 2007. ISBN 978-0-309-10112-7.
- The God Effect. St Martin's Press. 2006. ISBN 978-0312343415.
- A Brief History of Infinity. Constable & Robinson. 2003. ISBN 1-84119-650-9.
- The First Scientist. Constable & Robinson. 2003. ISBN 1-84119-618-5.
- Light Years. Piatkus. 2001. ISBN 0-7499-2197-8. new edition: Light Years. Icon Books. 2015. ISBN 978-1-84831-814-4.
