= Jean Prouvost =

French businessman (1885–1978)

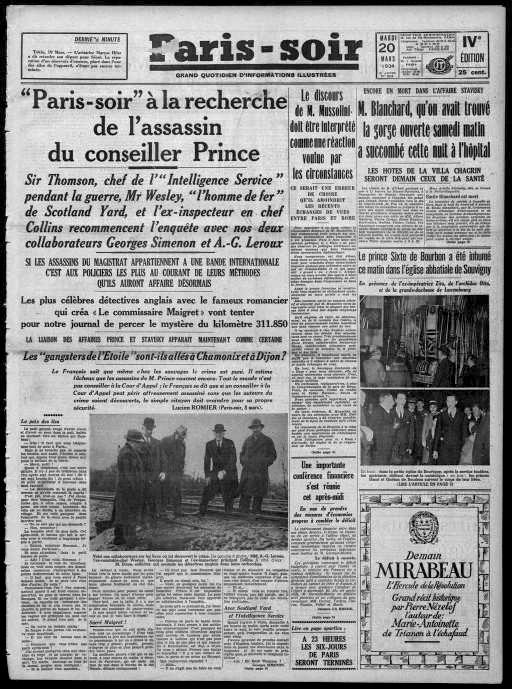
Paris-Soir, 20 March 1934

Jean Prouvost (24 April 1885, Roubaix – 18 October 1978, Yvoy-le-Marron) was a French businessman, media owner and politician. Prouvost was best known for building and owning the publications that became France-Soir, Paris Match, and Télé 7 Jours.

== Early life ==
Prouvost was born into a family of industrialists from Northern France, the son of Albert Felix Prouvost, president of the Commercial Court of Roubaix, and Martha Devémy. Jean Prouvost was not the eldest son and would not inherit the family firm, Peignage Amédée Prouvost. Prouvost instead borrowed one million francs and in 1911 started La Lainière de Roubaix, a textile company that quickly became a leader in the European textile industry.

== Newspaper empire ==
After the First World War, Jean Prouvost focused his interests on the newspaper business. In 1924 he bought Paris-Midi, a Paris daily that then had a circulation of 4,000. Six years later, thanks to a bold commercial and editorial policy, circulation had reached 100,000. In 1930 he bought Paris-Soir, where he introduced methods proven in the United States: extensive photo spreads, high quality paper, and especially the improvement of content. He recruited top journalists (Pierre Lazareff, Paul Gordeaux and Hervé Mille) and commissioned occasional contributions from prominent literary names: Colette covered various subjects; Jean Cocteau toured the world for the newspaper; Georges Simenon reported on sensational criminal cases. Prouvost hired as war correspondents Blaise Cendrars, Joseph Kessel, Antoine de Saint-Exupéry, and Paul Gordeaux. Paris-Soir published story serializations from Maurice Dekobra, Pierre Mac Orlan and Pierre Daninos. From 70,000 copies in 1930, the circulation of Paris-Soir reached 1.7 million in 1936. Jean Prouvost soon had an empire that also included Marie Claire, the women's magazine founded in March 1937, and the sports paper Match, bought the following year from Louis Louis-Dreyfus Group.

During the Second World War, on 6 June 1940, with France on the verge of surrender, Prouvost became information minister in the Reynaud government and on 19 June 1940 High Commissioner for Information in the Petain government, a post he resigned on 10 July 1940, when Pétain took dictatorial powers.

During the Occupation, two versions of Paris-Soir were published: one in Paris, a collaborationist daily disowned by Jean Prouvost and his colleagues, and another published in Lyon. During this period, Jean Prouvost was hated by both the Vichy regime and by the Resistance. At the Liberation he was charged with Indignité nationale, the criminal offense of collaboration with the Nazi regime, but the High Court dismissed the charge in 1947.

== Post-war ==
After that time, Jean Prouvost began to rebuild his empire, dismantled after the liberation. The FFI authorities had confiscated newspapers that had continued to publish after the German 1942 invasion of Vichy France. While he had permanently lost Paris-Soir, which soon became France-Soir under his former employee Pierre Lazareff, Match was reborn in 1949 under the name Paris Match, with Paul Gordeaux as its first editor. Marie Claire restarted publication in 1953. In 1950, Prouvost and Ferdinand Béghin together bought half the shares of the newspaper Le Figaro. In 1960, Jean Prouvost bought TV 60, which he renamed Télé 7 Jours, a television magazine that became a huge success (with a circulation of 3 million copies in 1978). Paris Match's circulation later declined however, suffering from competition from radio and TV. Prouvost appointed the writer Gaston Bonheur as director of his newspaper holdings.

In 1966, Prouvost became involved in radio and acquired a significant shareholding in Radio-Télé-Luxembourg. Prouvost was appointed the company's Président administrateur délégué (that is, Chairman and CEO) in 1965. Prouvost renamed Radio Luxembourg as RTL on 11 October 1966 to make it seem less foreign to French listeners and changed the programming to adopt a more modern and friendly tone.

From 1970, the Prouvost empire entered a period of difficulties. In July 1975 Le Figaro was sold to Robert Hersant, while in 1976 Télé 7 Jours was sold to the Hachette group and Paris Match was acquired by the Filipacchi group. By the time of Jean Prouvost's death in October 1978, only the women's publications remained in his family.

== Private life ==
He married Germaine Lefebvre (died 1973), daughter of Edmond Henri Lefebvre (a Roubaix industrialist) and Julie Marie Grimonprez.

In 1951, Prouvost became the mayor of Yvoy-le-Marron, a small village in Loir-et-Cher, where he later retired.

== See also ==
- Jacques Fath

== Sources ==
- Marcel Haedrich, Citizen Prouvost : Le portrait incontournable d'un grand patron de la presse française (Citizen Prouvost: The essential portrait of a great baron of the French press), Filipacchi Eds, Levallois-Perret, 1995.
- Raymond Barillon, Le cas Paris-Soir, Paris, Armand Colin, Col. Kiosque, 1959.
- Philippe Boegner, Oui Patron (Yes Boss).
- Guillaume Hanoteau, La fabuleuse aventure de Paris-Match.
- Encyclopaedia universalis. Universalia, 1979.*
