= La Ferté-Imbault =

- Commune
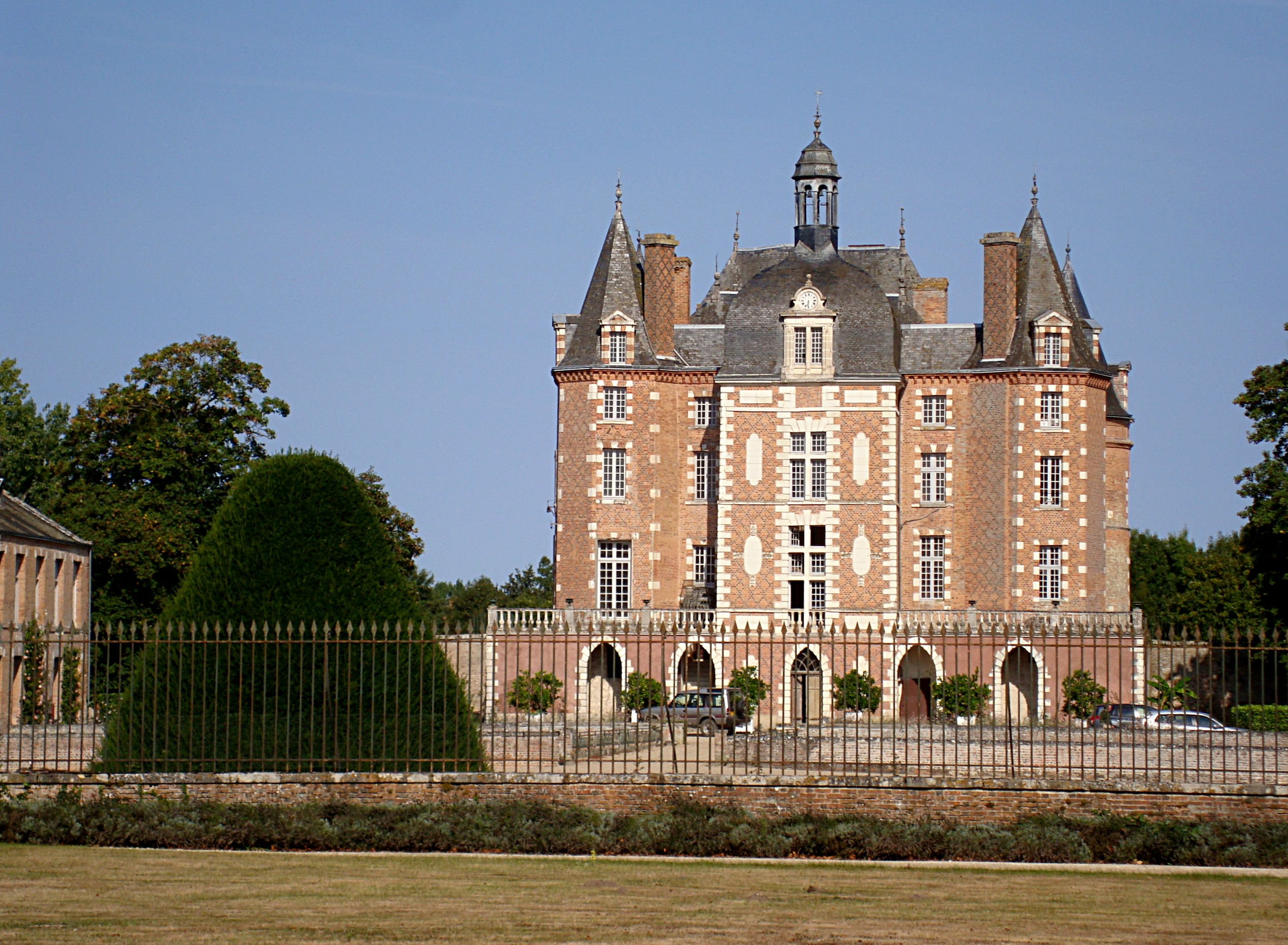
- Chateau

- Coat of arms
- Location of La Ferté-Imbault
- Location within France Location within Centre-Val de Loire
- Coordinates: 47°23′12″N 1°57′23″E
- Country: France
- Region: Centre-Val de Loire
- Department: Loir-et-Cher
- Arrondissement: Romorantin-Lanthenay
- Canton: La Sologne
- Intercommunality: Sologne des rivières

Government
  - Mayor (2020–2026): Isabelle Gasselin
- Area^{1}: 50.02 km^{2} (19.31 sq mi)
- Highest elevation: 126 m (413 ft)
- Lowest elevation: 94 m (308 ft)
- Population (2023): 947
  - Density: 18.9/km^{2} (49.0/sq mi)
- Time zone: UTC+01:00 (CET)
  - Summer (DST): UTC+02:00 (CEST)
- INSEE/Postal code: 41084 /41300
- ^{1} French Land Register data, which excludes lakes, ponds, glaciers > 1 km^{2} (0.386 sq mi or 247 acres) and river estuaries.

La Ferté-Imbault (French pronunciation: [la fɛʁte ɛ̃bo]) is a commune in the Loir-et-Cher department of central France.

La Ferté-Imbault is home to Château de La Ferté-Imbault.

== Geography ==
The Rère forms part of the commune's southern border.

== Population ==
Historical population
Year	Pop.	±% p.a.
1968	1,088	—
1975	1,123	+0.45%
1982	1,104	−0.24%
1990	1,047	−0.66%
1999	1,035	−0.13%
2007	974	−0.76%
2012	986	+0.25%
2017	975	−0.22%
2023	947	−0.48%
Source: INSEE

== Veteran cycles rally ==
The annual rally of the International Veteran Cycle Association was held in La Ferté-Imbault from 1 to 5 June 2011.

== See also ==
- Communes of the Loir-et-Cher department
