= Paris-soir =

French daily newspaper

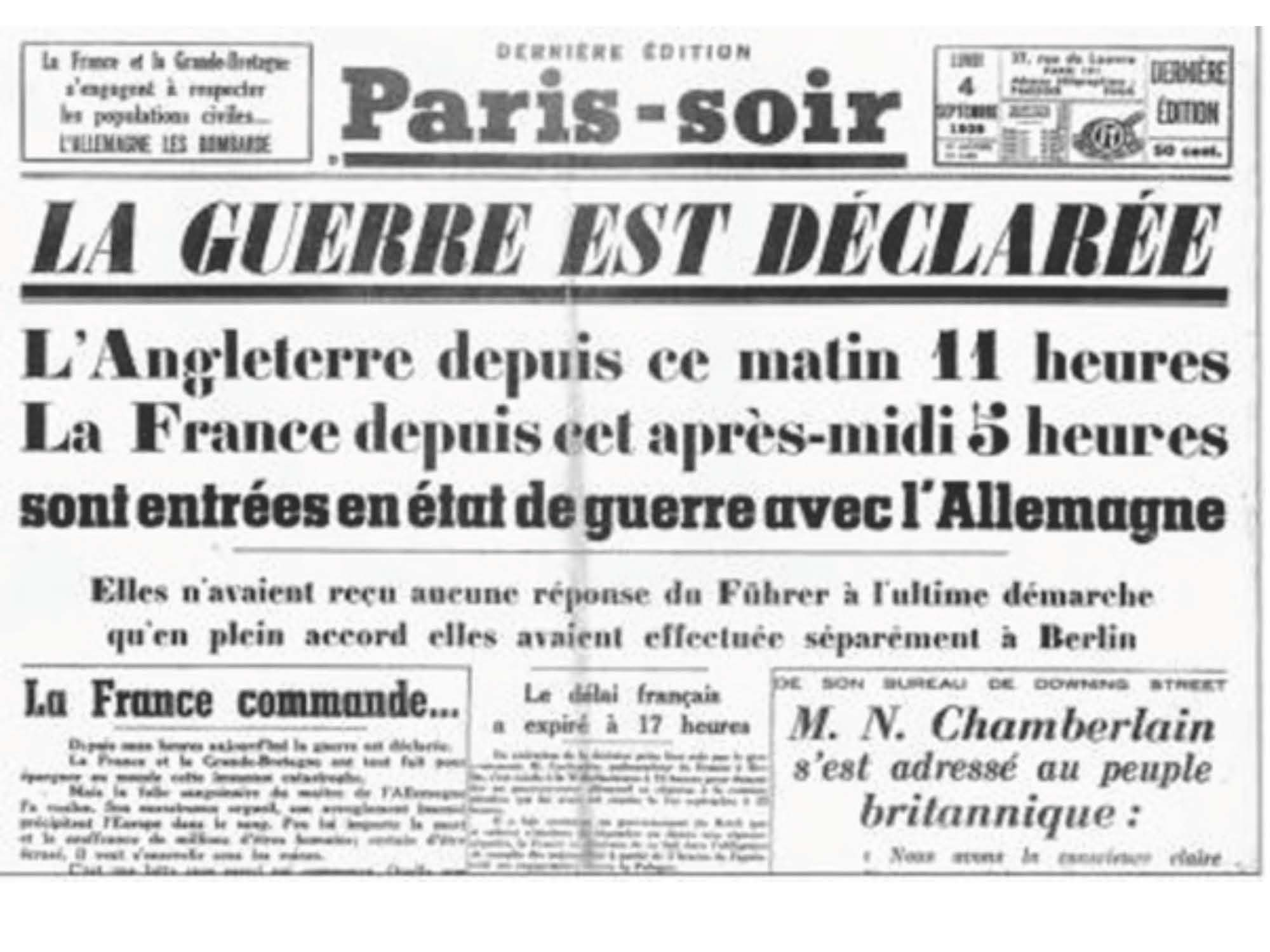
- Front page, 3 September 1939, France Declares War on Germany
- Type: Daily newspaper
- Owner: Jean Prouvost
- Founder: Eugène Merle
- Founded: 4 October 1923
- Ceased publication: 17 August 1944
- Political alignment: Extreme left (pre-1930); Right-wing (1930—1940); Collaborationism (1940—1944)
- Language: French
- Headquarters: Paris
- Country: France
- Circulation: 2,500,000 (1940); 300,000 (1942)
- Sister newspapers: Paris-soir Dimanche; Paris-Midi
- ISSN: 1256-0421

Paris-soir (French pronunciation: [paʁi swaʁ]) was a French newspaper founded in 1923 and published until 1944 when it was banned for having been a collaborationist newspaper during the war.

== Publication history ==
The first issue of Paris-soir came out on 4 October 1923, founded by the anarchist Eugène Merle. The paper's early years as a vehicle of radical left ideas proved financially untenable, and it was sold in 1930 to businessman Jean Prouvost, who immediately turned it into a populist evening newspaper, its politics radically changing to a staunch conservative stance, although distinctly anti-fascist in comparison to other right-wing publications. Prouvost also attempted to bring the French newspaper industry up to date by introducing elements that had long become popular in the United States and Britain, including crossword puzzles, comic strips and features for women.

Before the war Paris-soir boasted a circulation of two and a half million – the largest circulation of any newspaper in Europe at that time. It aimed at a lower audience than the higher-quality papers Le Figaro and Le Temps. In 1934 a building was specially built for it, by Fernand Leroy et Jacques Cury, at 37 rue du Louvre, today Le Figaro's headquarters.

A Sunday edition, Paris-soir Dimanche was published from 22 December 1935 until 16 September 1939.

When Paris was occupied by Nazi Germany in June 1940, Paris-soir was the only newspaper to have its printing press, which was new and considered the best in Europe, handed over to the Germans right away. A version of Paris-soir was published in Paris under German control from 22 June 1940 to 17 August 1944, with Pierre Mouton as editor-in-chief.

Meanwhile, the paper's owner, Jean Prouvost, moved the staff out of Paris and continued the publication of a separate version of Paris-soir in Vichy France: Clermont-Ferrand, Lyon and Marseille. Albert Camus worked as layout editor for this paper from March until December 1940. He was disgusted by the paper's support for the collaborationist Pétain government.

Upon hearing of the Allied landing in 1944, the editorial staff secretly returned to Paris. Before the end of fighting in Paris, on 20 August, journalists in the French Resistance accompanied by French Forces of the Interior occupied Paris-soir's building, armed with requisition orders. The Popular, Le Franc-Tireur, Combat, Le Parisien Libéré, all newspapers close to the resistance, were published using Paris-soir's presses. The building of Paris-soir was occupied by Ce Soir, Libération and Front national. Paris-soir's management departed, and its leaders were arrested by the FFI. Jean Prouvost went into hiding to avoid arrest. The archives of Paris-soir, held in Paris, were however saved.

== Sources ==
- Barrillon, R. (1959). Le cas Paris-soir. Collection Kiosque (in French). A. Colin.
