= Chaumont-sur-Tharonne =

- Commune
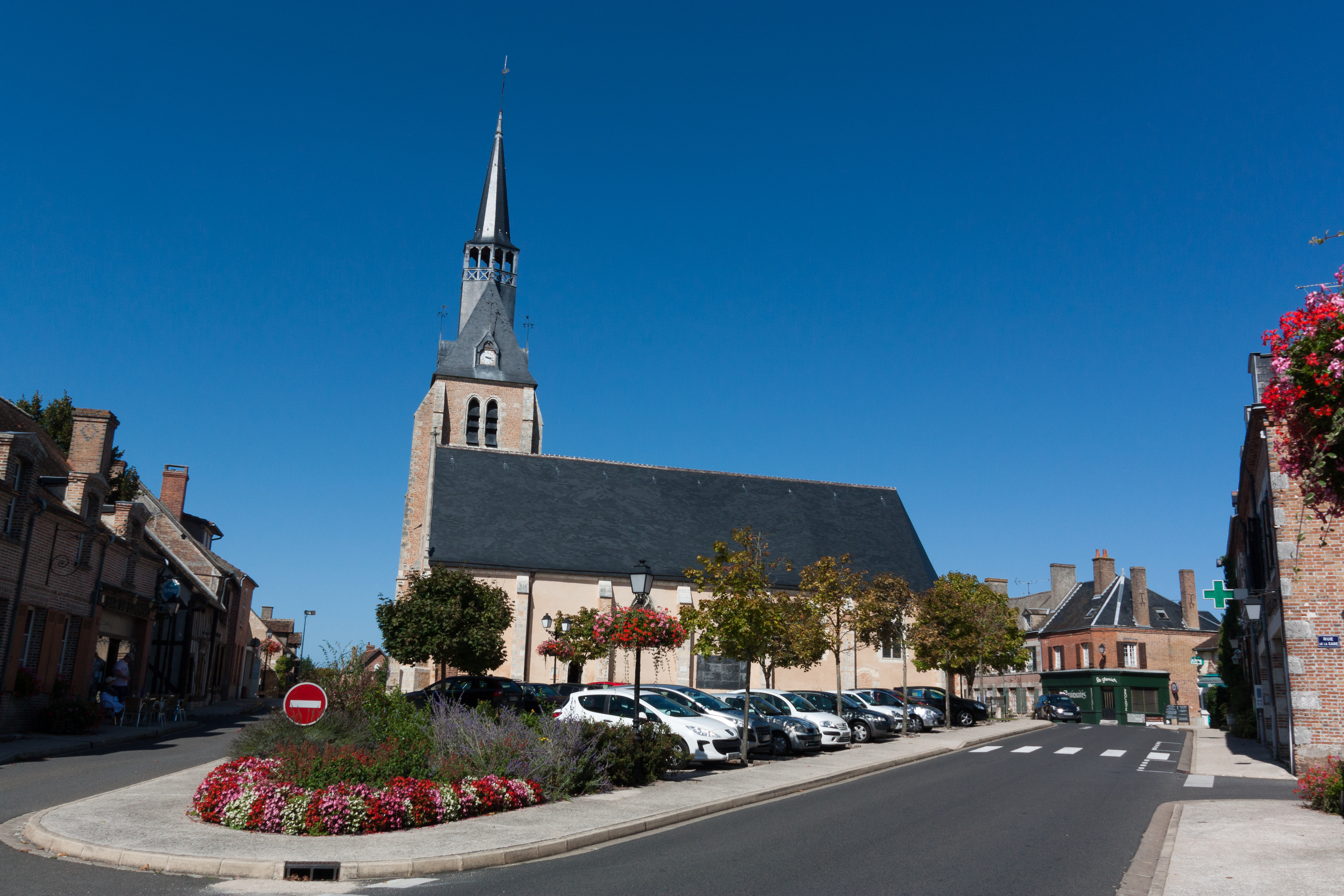

- Coat of arms
- Location of Chaumont-sur-Tharonne
- Location within France Location within Centre-Val de Loire
- Coordinates: 47°36′43″N 1°54′24″E
- Country: France
- Region: Centre-Val de Loire
- Department: Loir-et-Cher
- Arrondissement: Romorantin-Lanthenay
- Canton: La Sologne
- Intercommunality: Cœur de Sologne

Government
  - Mayor (2020–2026): Laurent Auger
- Area^{1}: 78.33 km^{2} (30.24 sq mi)
- Elevation: 128 m (420 ft)
- Highest elevation: 142 m (466 ft)
- Lowest elevation: 98 m (322 ft)
- Population (2023): 1,042
  - Density: 13.30/km^{2} (34.45/sq mi)
- Time zone: UTC+01:00 (CET)
  - Summer (DST): UTC+02:00 (CEST)
- INSEE/Postal code: 41046 /41600
- ^{1} French Land Register data, which excludes lakes, ponds, glaciers > 1 km^{2} (0.386 sq mi or 247 acres) and river estuaries.

Chaumont-sur-Tharonne (French pronunciation: [ʃomɔ̃ syʁ taʁɔn]) is a commune in the Loir-et-Cher department in the administrative region of Centre-Val de Loire, France.

== Population ==
Historical population
Year	Pop.	±% p.a.
1968	979	—
1975	932	−0.70%
1982	905	−0.42%
1990	901	−0.06%
1999	1,072	+1.95%
2007	1,075	+0.03%
2012	1,111	+0.66%
2017	1,074	−0.68%
2023	1,042	−0.50%
Source: INSEE

== See also ==
- Communes of the Loir-et-Cher department
