= Canton of La Sologne =

Administrative division of Loir-et-Cher, France

Coordinates: 47.43°N 2.05°E

A map of the canton of La Sologne in the Loir-et-Cher department

The canton of La Sologne (French: Canton de la Sologne) is a canton (an administrative division) of the Loir-et-Cher department, central France. Its seat is Salbris. It was created at the canton reorganisation that came into effect in March 2015. Since then it elects two members of the Departmental Council of Loir-et-Cher.

== Composition ==
The canton of La Sologne consists of the following communes:

1. Chaon
2. Chaumont-sur-Tharonne
3. La Ferté-Imbault
4. Lamotte-Beuvron
5. Marcilly-en-Gault
6. Nouan-le-Fuzelier
7. Pierrefitte-sur-Sauldre
8. Saint-Viâtre
9. Salbris
10. Selles-Saint-Denis
11. Souesmes
12. Souvigny-en-Sologne
13. Vouzon
14. Yvoy-le-Marron

== See also ==
- Sologne
