= Saint-Viâtre =

- Commune
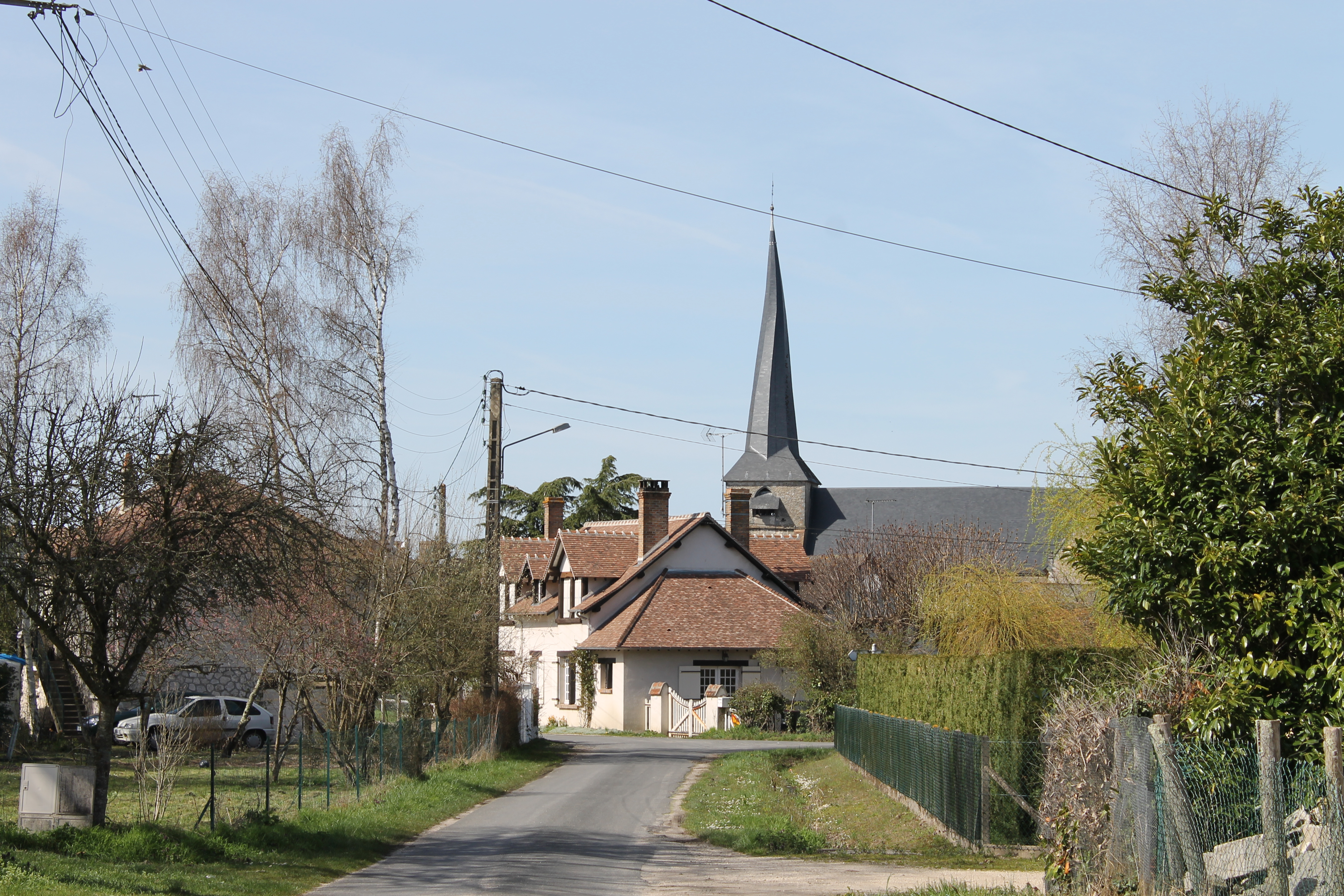

- Coat of arms
- Location of Saint-Viâtre
- Location within France Location within Centre-Val de Loire
- Coordinates: 47°31′27″N 1°56′03″E
- Country: France
- Region: Centre-Val de Loire
- Department: Loir-et-Cher
- Arrondissement: Romorantin-Lanthenay
- Canton: La Sologne
- Intercommunality: Sologne des étangs

Government
  - Mayor (2020–2026): Christian Léonard
- Area^{1}: 89.79 km^{2} (34.67 sq mi)
- Elevation: 108 m (354 ft)
- Highest elevation: 132 m (433 ft)
- Lowest elevation: 92 m (302 ft)
- Population (2023): 1,180
  - Density: 13.1/km^{2} (34.0/sq mi)
- Time zone: UTC+01:00 (CET)
  - Summer (DST): UTC+02:00 (CEST)
- INSEE/Postal code: 41231 /41210
- ^{1} French Land Register data, which excludes lakes, ponds, glaciers > 1 km^{2} (0.386 sq mi or 247 acres) and river estuaries.

Saint-Viâtre (French pronunciation: [sɛ̃ vjatʁ]) is a commune in the Loir-et-Cher department in central France.

== History ==
The village was originally called Tremblevif, from the Latin for "aspen" and "village", but suggesting in the popular imagination a place prone to swamp fever and trembling limbs. In 1854, worried that outsiders might be put off, the villagers successfully petitioned to change the name to Saint-Viâtre in honour of a hermit, traditionally known as Viâtre, who had lived in the forests of Sologne. His tomb is in the crypt of the village church.

== Population ==
Historical population
Year	Pop.	±% p.a.
1968	1,245	—
1975	1,223	−0.25%
1982	1,162	−0.73%
1990	1,063	−1.11%
1999	1,157	+0.95%
2007	1,184	+0.29%
2012	1,273	+1.46%
2017	1,196	−1.24%
2023	1,180	−0.22%
Source: INSEE

== See also ==
- Communes of the Loir-et-Cher department
