= Souvigny-en-Sologne =

- Commune
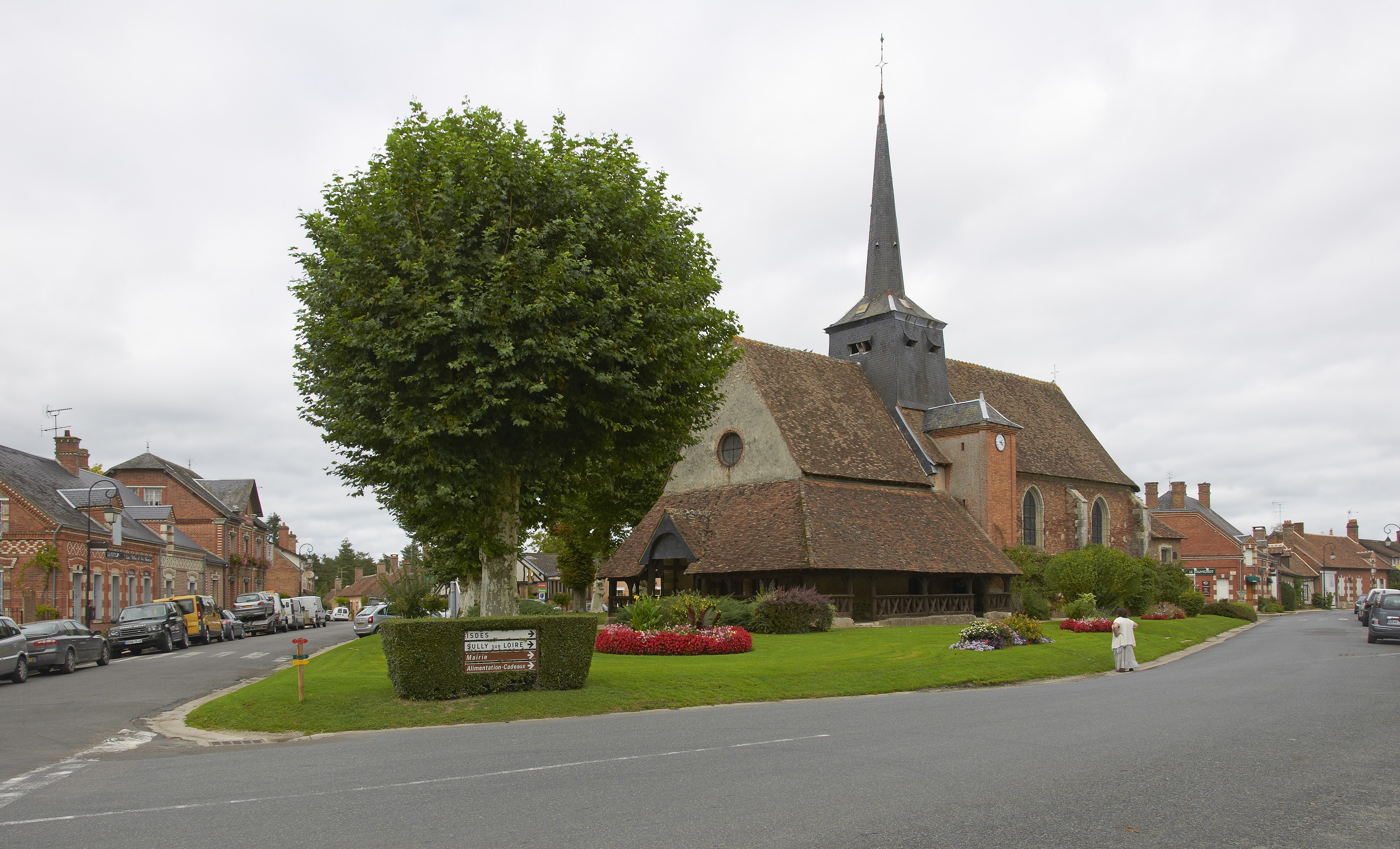

- Coat of arms
- Location of Souvigny-en-Sologne
- Location within France Location within Centre-Val de Loire
- Coordinates: 47°38′43″N 2°09′54″E
- Country: France
- Region: Centre-Val de Loire
- Department: Loir-et-Cher
- Arrondissement: Romorantin-Lanthenay
- Canton: La Sologne
- Intercommunality: Cœur de Sologne

Government
  - Mayor (2020–2026): Chantal Meersschaut
- Area^{1}: 41.55 km^{2} (16.04 sq mi)
- Elevation: 145 m (476 ft)
- Highest elevation: 152 m (499 ft)
- Lowest elevation: 122 m (400 ft)
- Population (2023): 495
  - Density: 11.9/km^{2} (30.9/sq mi)
- Time zone: UTC+01:00 (CET)
  - Summer (DST): UTC+02:00 (CEST)
- INSEE/Postal code: 41251 /41600
- ^{1} French Land Register data, which excludes lakes, ponds, glaciers > 1 km^{2} (0.386 sq mi or 247 acres) and river estuaries.

Souvigny-en-Sologne (French pronunciation: [suviɲi ɑ̃ sɔlɔɲ], Souvigny in Sologne) is a commune of the Loir-et-Cher department in central France.

== Population ==
Historical population
Year	Pop.	±% p.a.
1968	406	—
1975	395	−0.39%
1982	426	+1.09%
1990	440	+0.41%
1999	410	−0.78%
2007	476	+1.88%
2012	499	+0.95%
2017	524	+0.98%
2023	495	−0.94%
Source: INSEE

== See also ==
- Communes of the Loir-et-Cher department
