= Chaon, Loir-et-Cher =

Chaon
- Commune
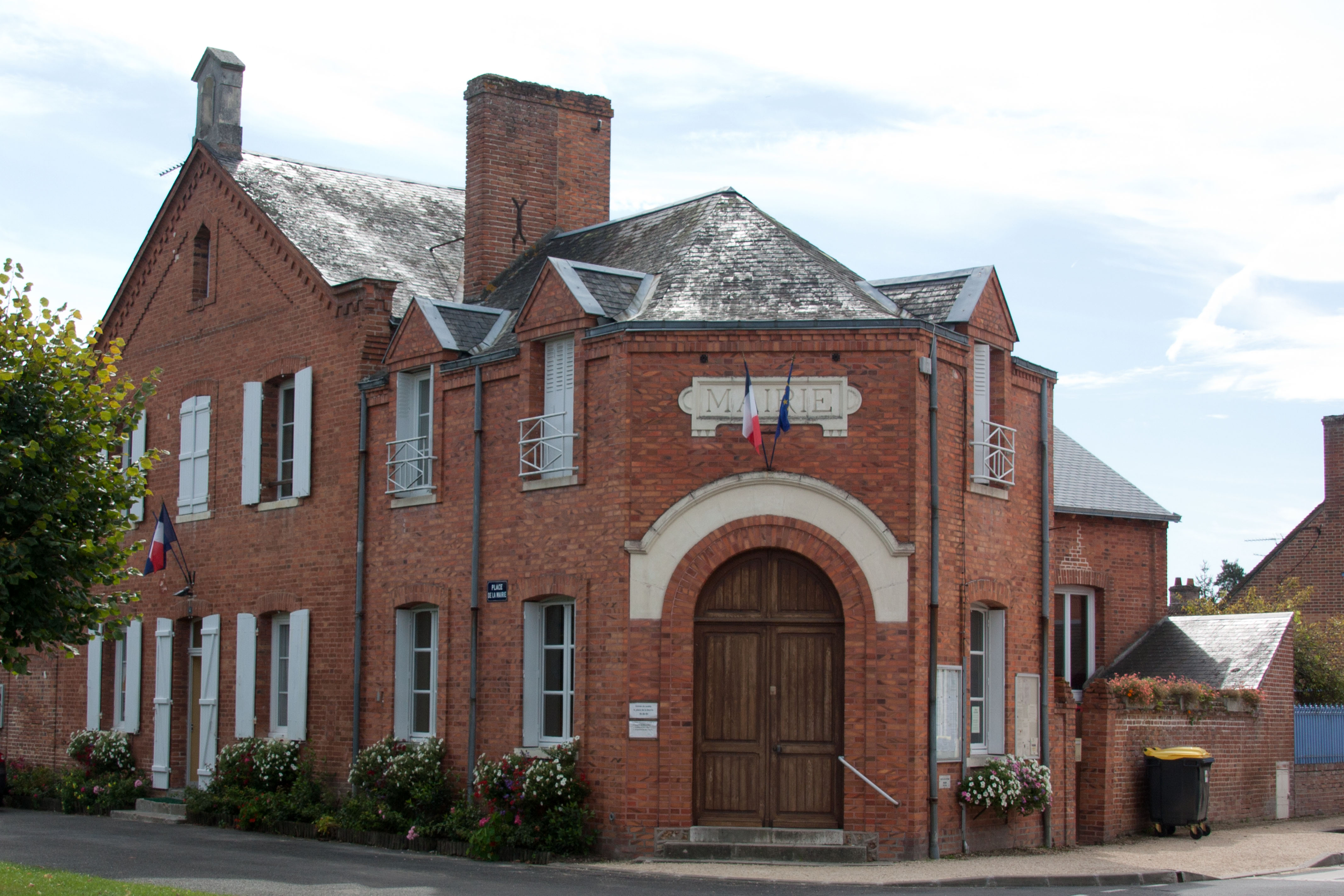
- Town hall
- Location of Chaon
- Location within France Location within Centre-Val de Loire
- Coordinates: 47°36′34″N 2°10′24″E
- Country: France
- Region: Centre-Val de Loire
- Department: Loir-et-Cher
- Arrondissement: Romorantin-Lanthenay
- Canton: La Sologne
- Intercommunality: Cœur de Sologne

Government
  - Mayor (2020–2026): Patrick Morin
- Area^{1}: 31.85 km^{2} (12.30 sq mi)
- Elevation: 125 m (410 ft)
- Highest elevation: 151 m (495 ft)
- Lowest elevation: 112 m (367 ft)
- Population (2023): 435
  - Density: 13.7/km^{2} (35.4/sq mi)
- Time zone: UTC+01:00 (CET)
  - Summer (DST): UTC+02:00 (CEST)
- INSEE/Postal code: 41036 /41600
- ^{1} French Land Register data, which excludes lakes, ponds, glaciers > 1 km^{2} (0.386 sq mi or 247 acres) and river estuaries.

Chaon is a commune in the Loir-et-Cher department in central France.

== Population ==
Historical population
Year	Pop.	±% p.a.
1968	310	—
1975	304	−0.28%
1982	336	+1.44%
1990	372	+1.28%
1999	375	+0.09%
2007	436	+1.90%
2012	467	+1.38%
2017	459	−0.34%
2023	435	−0.89%
Source: INSEE

== See also ==
- Communes of the Loir-et-Cher department
