= Mayor (France) =

Public office in France

In France, a mayor (French: maire, pronounced [mɛʁ]) is chairperson of the municipal council, which organises the work and deliberates on municipal matters. The mayor also has significant powers and their own responsibilities, such as the responsibility for the activities of municipal police and for the management of municipal staff.

The officeholder is also the representative of the state in the commune. As such, the mayor is a civil officer of the State (Officier d'état civil) and judiciary police officer (Officier de police judiciaire). The term period of office for a mayor is six years.

== Elections ==
=== History ===
From 1789 to 1799 municipal officials (mayors) were directly elected for 2 years and re-elected by the active citizens of the commune with taxpayers contributing at least 3 days of work to the commune. Those who were eligible could instead pay a tax equivalent to not less than 10 days of work.

In 1799 the constitution of 22 Frimaire year VIII (13 December 1799) revoked the direct election of the mayor, with mayors of communes of less than 5,000 inhabitants being appointed by the prefect. This constitution established the nomination of mayors and councilors. After 1831 mayors were appointed (by the king for communes with more than 3,000 inhabitants, by the prefect for smaller), but councilors were elected for six years.

From 3 July 1848 to 1851 mayors were elected by the municipal council for communes with less than 6,000 inhabitants.

From 1851 to 1871 mayors were appointed by the prefect for communes with less than 3000 inhabitants and for a term of 5 years from 1855 on.

Since 1871 mayors have been elected by their peers by the municipal council following their election by universal suffrage.

There are, however, six French communes that do not elect their mayor by universal suffrage with the mayor being appointed by the Prefect. Specifically these are villages which were devastated during the Battle of Verdun in 1916 and never rebuilt because of large amounts of unexploded ordnance and land pollution. These are Bezonvaux, Beaumont-en-Verdunois, Cumières-le-Mort-Homme, Fleury-devant-Douaumont, Haumont-près-Samogneux and Louvemont-Côte-du-Poivre.

=== Current status ===
The mayor is the chairman of the municipal council, and is elected by secret ballot of municipal councilors during the first meeting of the Municipal Council that must be held between Friday and Sunday following the municipal elections.

If no candidate obtains an absolute majority after two rounds of voting the election proceeds to a third round which requires only a simple majority. In case of a tie, the oldest candidate wins.

As for other councilors, the mayor must be at least 18 years of age when elected to office. The mayor must be a French national. Councilors (except for mayors and deputies) can be citizens of a member country of the European Union.

=== Conflicts of interest and concurrent appointments ===
Mayoral duties are considered a conflict of interest with those of a president of a regional council, President of a general council (the name of which is being changed to conseil départemental ('departmental councilor') after the local elections of 2015), as well as a European Commissioner, a member of the Executive Board of the European Central Bank or a member of the board of monetary Policy the Banque de France.

There are even some positions in the Directorate of Public Finances which are in conflict: notably those in charge of collecting or controlling taxation, the holder of which office cannot be elected mayor or deputy mayor. Volunteer firefighters cannot be elected mayor of a commune of 3,500 inhabitants or more, nor deputy mayor of a commune of over 5,000 inhabitants.

The law on dual mandates allows a mayor to hold a single elective office (deputy of the National Assembly, senator, regional councilor, departmental councilor) in addition to his municipal office. The office of municipal councilor is not considered as an elective office for this purpose.

Currently a member of the government can serve as Mayor. However, in 1997 and 2007, since various prime ministers had demanded ministers and state secretaries resign their mayoral offices, most of them then became first deputy mayors.

=== Deputy mayor ===
The Municipal Council also elects the deputy mayor (French: adjoint au maire or maires-adjoints) having determined, by resolution, the number of deputy mayors. As for mayors they must be of French nationality and not be financial administration officials involved in the conflicts mentioned above, nor volunteer firefighters in municipalities with more than 5,000 inhabitants. In addition: "paid employees of the mayor can not be selected if the employment is directly related to the exercise of the office of mayor".

The number of deputy mayors is, at most, 30% of the city council. Thus, for municipalities with less than 100 inhabitants, where the city council is composed of, as in the 2014 French municipal elections, seven city councilors, the mayor may have a maximum of two deputies.

For municipalities with more than 80,000 inhabitants, in addition to the deputy-mayors, other council members may be appointed to be "mainly responsible for one or more quartiers ('districts')" with the number appointed not exceeding 10% of the city council workforce. These appointees are elected by the municipal council according to the same rules as those applicable to the election of the mayor.

Since the 2008 municipal elections, deputy mayors of municipalities with more than 3,500 inhabitants are elected by a party list with an absolute majority and without panachage (Note: Without being able to select candidates off of more than one party list.) nor instant run-offs in accordance with the principle of parity. Commencing from the municipal elections in 2014, these regulations apply to communes with more than 1,000 inhabitants in order to promote equality between men and women.

=== Special delegation ===
In case of dissolution of a Municipal Council, the resignation of all its members in office, the final cancellation of the election of its members, or if the Municipal Council can not be constituted, a special delegation, appointed by the prefecture within eight days, performs the functions of the municipal council.

This special delegation elects its president and, if applicable, its vice-president. The President or, failing that, the vice president acts in the office of mayor. Its powers cease upon installation of the new municipal council.

== Duration of mandate ==
The duration of the mandate for a mayor is equal to that of the municipal council — i.e. six years. The mayor can be reelected at the end of his term.

The mayor has his own mandate: he may resign freely and, in case of death or removal from office by court order or decision of the Council of Ministers, be replaced without causing new municipal elections.

== Functions ==
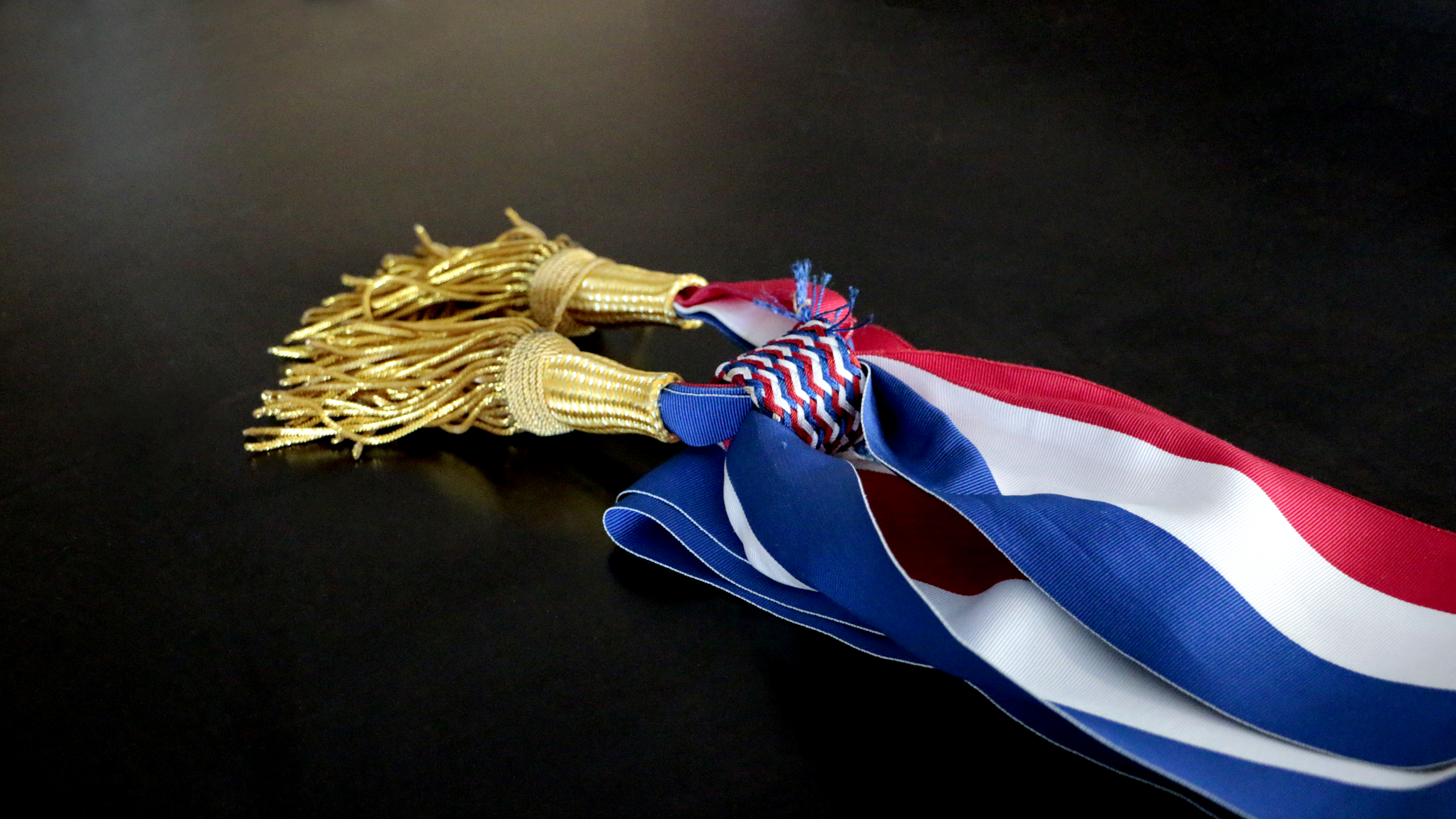
The écharpe tricolore is worn by the mayor during official duties.

The mayor is both agent of the State and of the commune as a local government entity.

The powers and duties of the mayor are particularly defined by the general code of local government (Code général des collectivités territoriales) namely:

As agent of the State

Under the authority of prefect, the mayor performs administrative functions, including:

- Publication of laws and regulations;
- The organization of elections;
- Validating signatures.
- The mayor is responsible, under the authority of the state representative in the department, for implementing measures of general safety and special functions assigned to him by law, for example, enforcing law number 79-1150 of 29 December 1979 on advertising signs
  - In case of emergency or to strengthen a local public policy goal in actions taken by a higher authority in a police matter, the mayor may be required to act under their own authority to enforce general administrative policy to assist state police special forces (e.g. the special police of historical monuments and natural sites).
- The Mayor also has functions in the judicial domain under the authority of prosecutor and serves as a civil officer and officiates in such things as civil marriages and officer of the judicial police
  - As such the mayor participates by virtue of their police powers in the exercise of public security duties
  - A Mayor may, in particular, on the instructions of the prosecutor or examining magistrate, be required to assist in inquiries into wanted people on their personalities, financial, family, and social situations.
  - In practice these duties are mostly assigned to the mayors of municipalities where there are no other police officers. The Mayor can draw up process-verbals for various infractions, particularly with regard to the regulation of building permits.
- The mayor also has a civil judicial function, which gives him the right to receive administrative acts which concern only his territory and have the same status as deeds. (Note: In practice, the mayor can not compete with notaries and acts in this capacity only when the town is affected by the act.)

== See also ==
- List of the mayors of Toulouse
- Mayor
- Nomination of Mayors under the French Third Republic
