= Pierrefitte-sur-Sauldre =

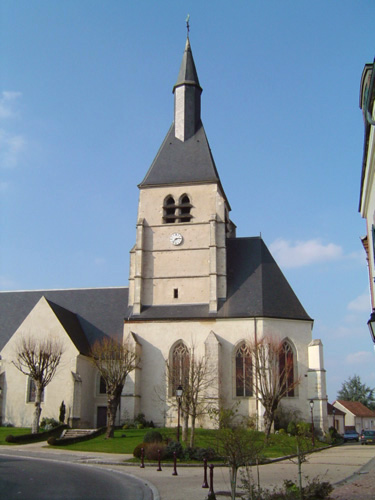
- Location of Pierrefitte-sur-Sauldre
- Location within France Location within Centre-Val de Loire
- Coordinates: 47°30′48″N 2°09′05″E
- Country: France
- Region: Centre-Val de Loire
- Department: Loir-et-Cher
- Arrondissement: Romorantin-Lanthenay
- Canton: La Sologne
- Intercommunality: La Sologne des rivières

Government
  - Mayor (2020–2026): Bernadette Courrioux
- Area^{1}: 74.96 km^{2} (28.94 sq mi)
- Elevation: 124 m (407 ft)
- Highest elevation: 148 m (486 ft)
- Lowest elevation: 108 m (354 ft)
- Population (2023): 749
  - Density: 9.99/km^{2} (25.9/sq mi)
- Time zone: UTC+01:00 (CET)
  - Summer (DST): UTC+02:00 (CEST)
- INSEE/Postal code: 41176 /41300
- ^{1} French Land Register data, which excludes lakes, ponds, glaciers > 1 km^{2} (0.386 sq mi or 247 acres) and river estuaries.

Pierrefitte-sur-Sauldre (French pronunciation: [pjɛʁfit syʁ soldʁ], literally Pierrefitte on Sauldre) is a commune in the Loir-et-Cher department of central France.

== Population ==
Historical population
Year	Pop.	±% p.a.
1968	892	—
1975	869	−0.37%
1982	907	+0.61%
1990	835	−1.03%
1999	851	+0.21%
2007	859	+0.12%
2012	841	−0.42%
2017	789	−1.27%
2023	749	−0.86%
Source: INSEE

== See also ==
- Communes of the Loir-et-Cher department
