= Marcilly-en-Gault =

- Commune
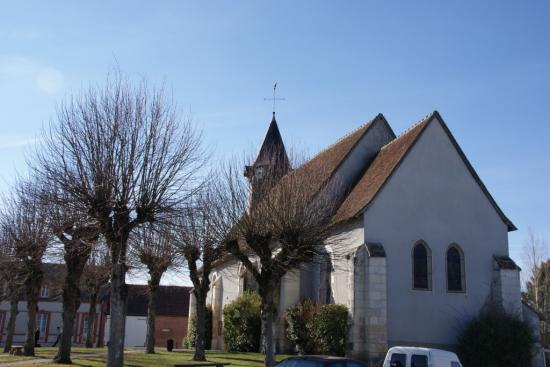
- Location of Marcilly-en-Gault
- Location within France Location within Centre-Val de Loire
- Coordinates: 47°27′57″N 1°52′28″E
- Country: France
- Region: Centre-Val de Loire
- Department: Loir-et-Cher
- Arrondissement: Romorantin-Lanthenay
- Canton: La Sologne
- Intercommunality: La Sologne des rivières

Government
  - Mayor (2020–2026): Agnès Thibault
- Area^{1}: 50.31 km^{2} (19.42 sq mi)
- Elevation: 127 m (417 ft)
- Highest elevation: 129 m (423 ft)
- Lowest elevation: 94 m (308 ft)
- Population (2023): 754
  - Density: 15.0/km^{2} (38.8/sq mi)
- Time zone: UTC+01:00 (CET)
  - Summer (DST): UTC+02:00 (CEST)
- INSEE/Postal code: 41125 /41210
- ^{1} French Land Register data, which excludes lakes, ponds, glaciers > 1 km^{2} (0.386 sq mi or 247 acres) and river estuaries.

Marcilly-en-Gault (French pronunciation: [maʁsiji ɑ̃ ɡo]) is a commune in the Loir-et-Cher department of central France.

== Population ==
Historical population
Year	Pop.	±% p.a.
1968	752	—
1975	677	−1.49%
1982	683	+0.13%
1990	752	+1.21%
1999	755	+0.04%
2007	744	−0.18%
2012	761	+0.45%
2017	735	−0.69%
2023	754	+0.43%
Source: INSEE

== See also ==
- Communes of the Loir-et-Cher department
