= Selles-Saint-Denis =

- Commune
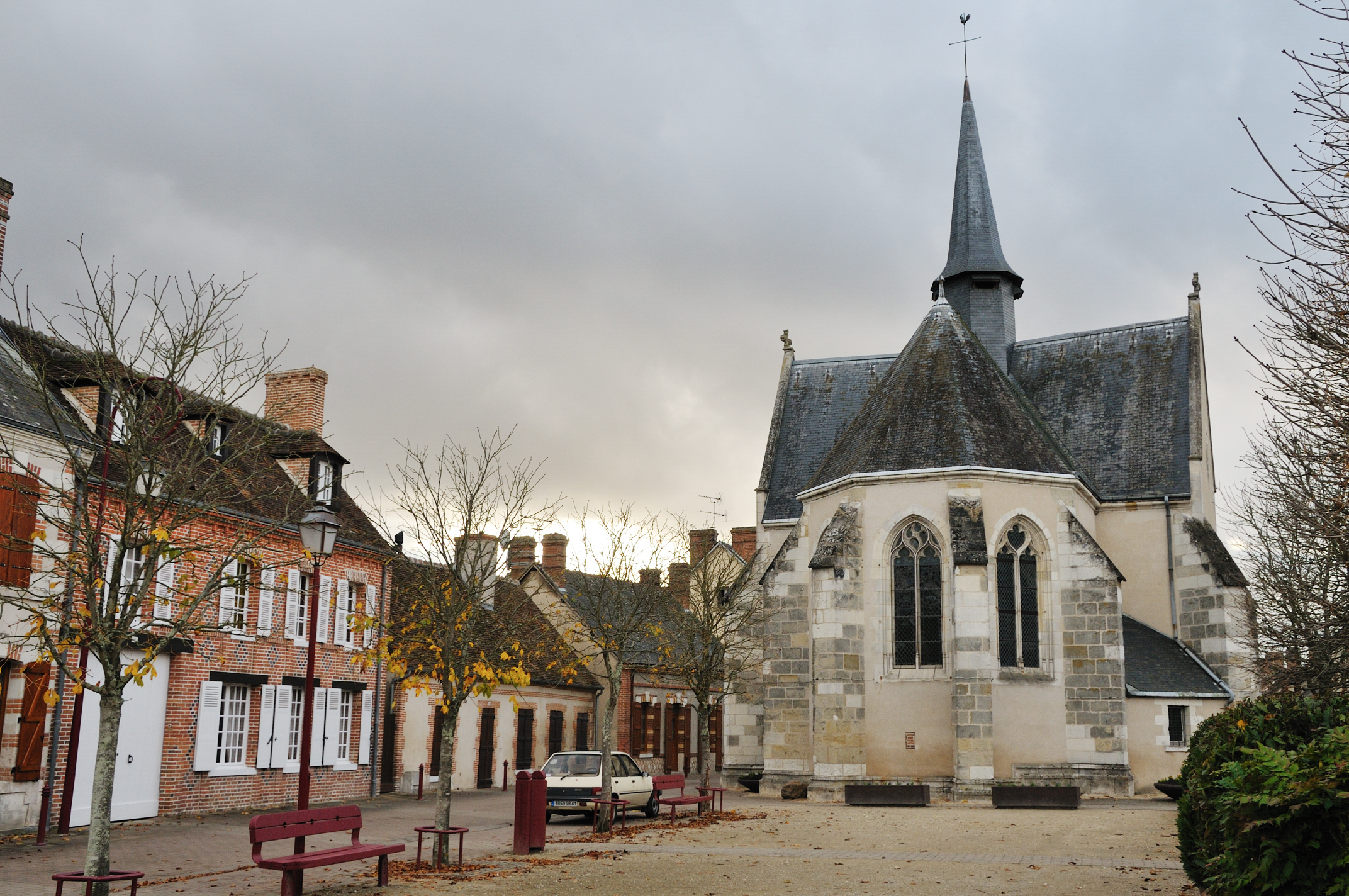
- Chapel of Saint-Genouph
- Location of Selles-Saint-Denis
- Location within France Location within Centre-Val de Loire
- Coordinates: 47°23′12″N 1°55′25″E
- Country: France
- Region: Centre-Val de Loire
- Department: Loir-et-Cher
- Arrondissement: Romorantin-Lanthenay
- Canton: La Sologne
- Intercommunality: La Sologne des rivières

Government
  - Mayor (2020–2026): Stéphane Leroy
- Area^{1}: 50.98 km^{2} (19.68 sq mi)
- Highest elevation: 129 m (423 ft)
- Lowest elevation: 89 m (292 ft)
- Population (2023): 1,334
  - Density: 26.17/km^{2} (67.77/sq mi)
- Time zone: UTC+01:00 (CET)
  - Summer (DST): UTC+02:00 (CEST)
- INSEE/Postal code: 41241 /41300
- ^{1} French Land Register data, which excludes lakes, ponds, glaciers > 1 km^{2} (0.386 sq mi or 247 acres) and river estuaries.

Selles-Saint-Denis (French pronunciation: [sɛl sɛ̃ dəni]) is a commune in the Loir-et-Cher department of central France.

== Geography ==
The river Rère flows west through the southern part of the commune.

== Population ==
Historical population
Year	Pop.	±% p.a.
1968	1,024	—
1975	1,071	+0.64%
1982	1,172	+1.30%
1990	1,199	+0.29%
1999	1,193	−0.06%
2007	1,213	+0.21%
2012	1,254	+0.67%
2017	1,337	+1.29%
2023	1,334	−0.04%
Source: INSEE

== See also ==
- Communes of the Loir-et-Cher department
