= Louis-Numa Baragnon =

French politician

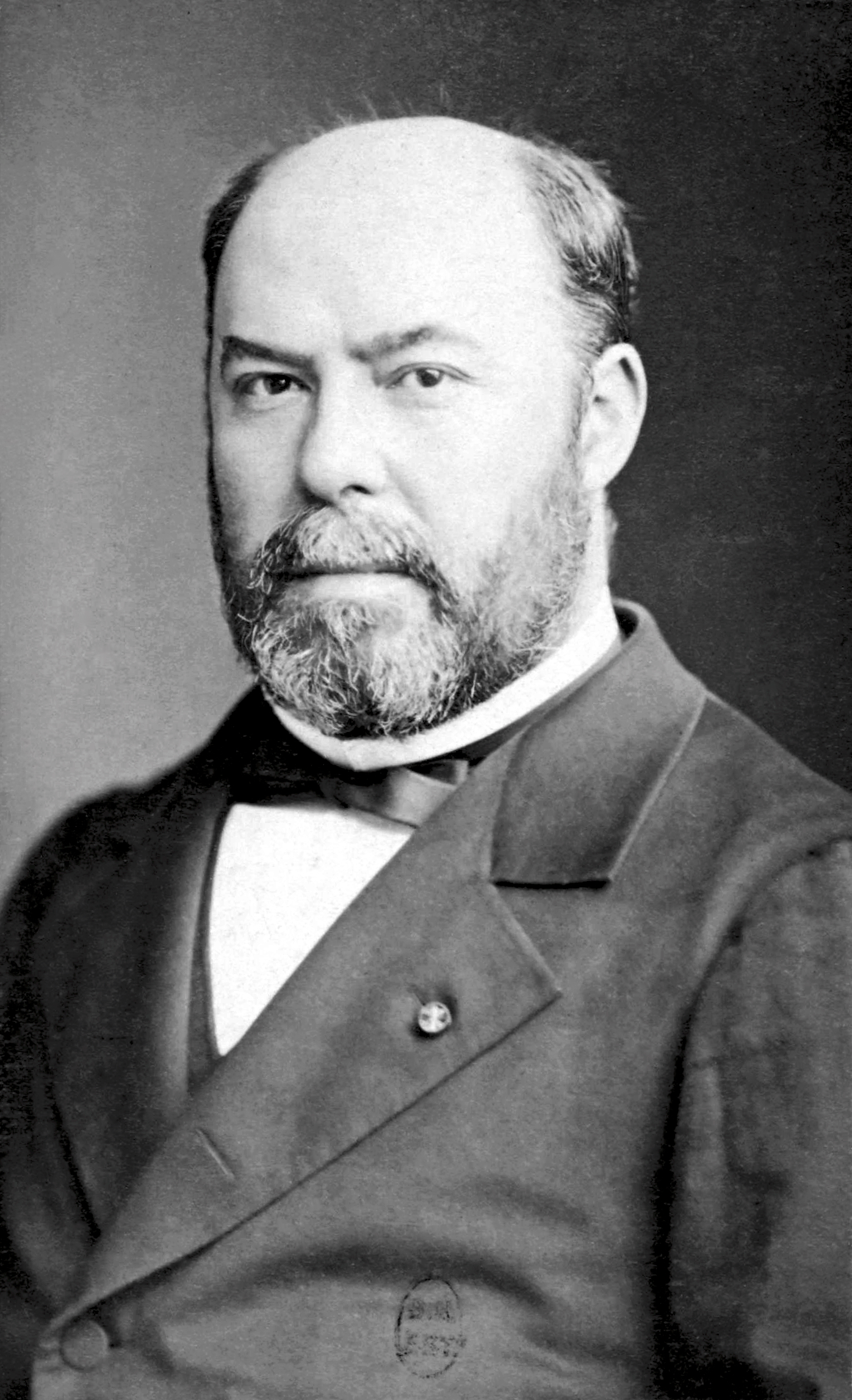

Pierre Joseph Louis Numa Baragnon (24 November 1835, in Nîmes – 18 May 1892) was a French Legitimist politician. He was a member of the National Assembly from 1871 to 1876, a member of the Chamber of Deputies in 1878, and a Life Senator from 1878 to 1892.
