= Amable Ricard =

Former French Minister of the Interior

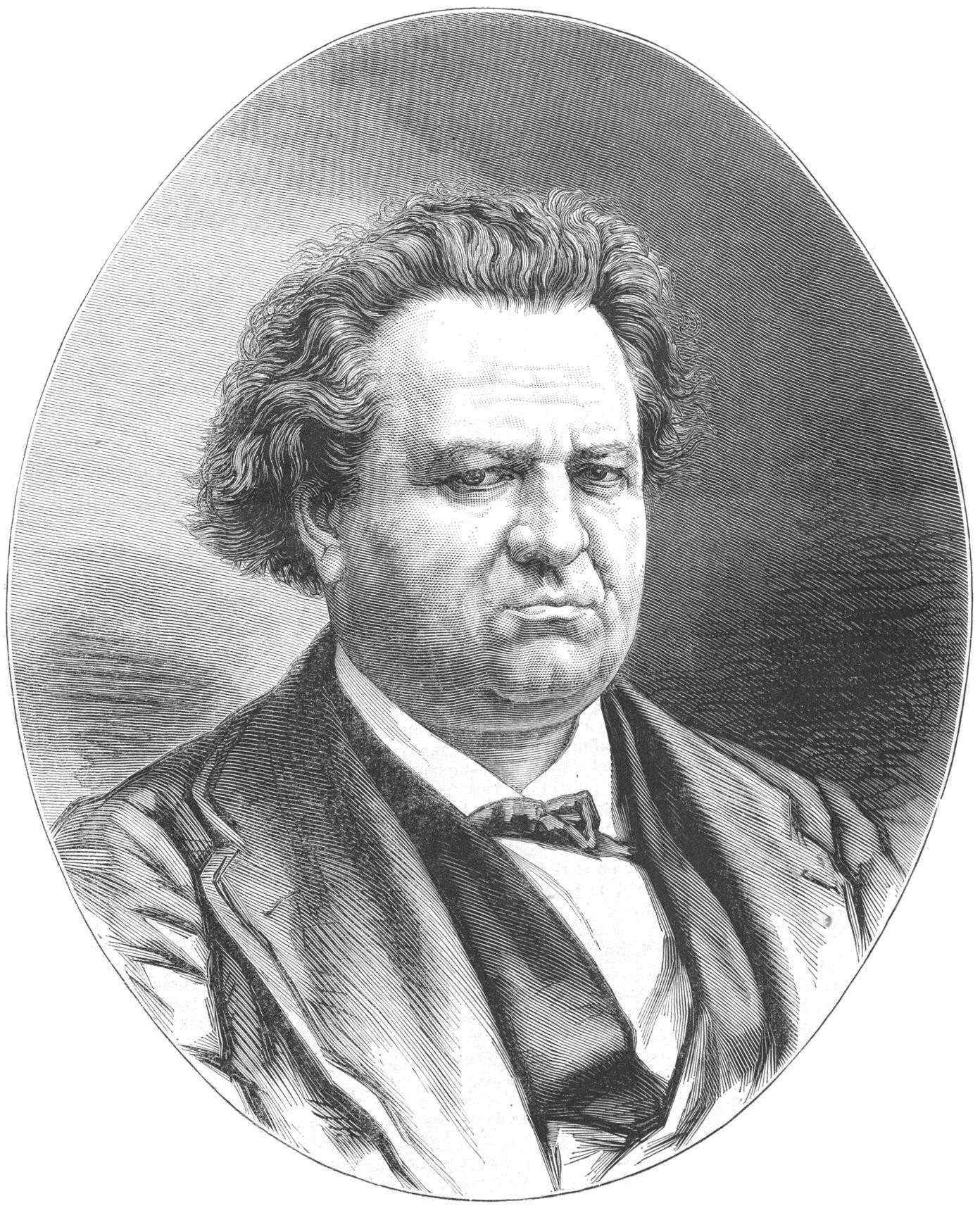

Minister of the Interior
- In office 9 March 1876 – 11 May 1876

Pierre Henri Amable Ricard (12 June 1828 – 11 May 1876) was a French politician and lawyer. He was Minister of the Interior between March 1876 and his death two months later.

A member of the republican centre-left, Ricard was deputy for Deux-Sèvres from 1871 to 1876, when he became a senator for life.
