= International Veteran Cycle Association =

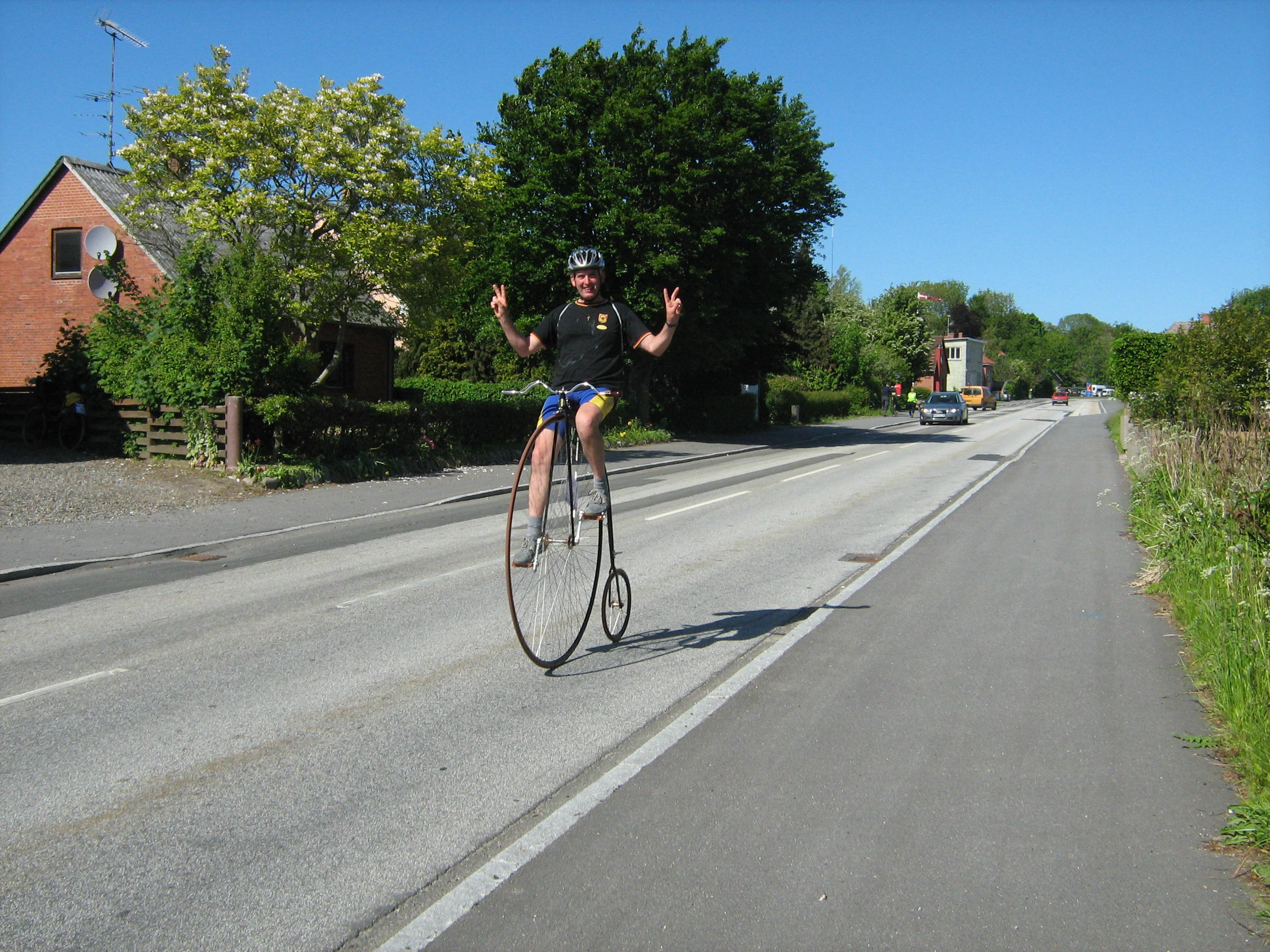
Participant in 2010 IVCA rally in Møn

The International Veteran Cycle Association (IVCA) promotes interest in the history of cycling. Its principal activity is the organisation of annual rallies, a different country hosting a programme for members each year.

== History and objectives ==
The first International Rally of this series was held from Belton House, near Grantham, England on 23 August 1981. The series were the idea of two dedicated Veteran Cycle Enthusiasts and Cycle Museum Curators, Gerard Buissett of France and Ray Fixter of England who together invited fifty entrants from Belgium, France, Germany, Spain and the UK. All rode original machines manufactured on or before 1890, half of the entry rode 1860c Boneshakers. At the sixth annual rally in 1986, the Association ( IVCA ) was formed at Lincoln, England on 26 May. It brought together those interested in early bicycles from a number of countries.

The basic objectives of the association are:

- to encourage activities in man-powered velocipede vehicles;
- to support relevant historical research in liaison with clubs and museums;
- to arrange rallies and meetings promoting interest in early bicycles including an annual International Veteran Cycle Rally.

== Annual rallies ==
Countries that have previously Hosted the yearly event are:

- 1981 England: Grantham.
- 1982 France: Ulis, Paris.
- 1983 England: Rothley, Leicestershire.

This event was originally to be Hosted by Belgium but due to an unfortunate accident to the Belgium organiser, Mr Wouters, a last minute arrangement was agreed to combine the International Rally with the UK National Rally.

- 1984 England: Harlow, Essex.
- 1985 Netherlands: Valkenswaard &
- 1985 Switzerland: Lucerne.

Due to breakdown in communications, two Rallies were held in 1985.
At the Swiss event the foundation/constitution of the IVCA was discussed.

- 1986 England: Lincoln.
- 1987 Netherlands: Nijmegen.
- 1988 France: Blois.
- 1989 Switzerland: Lenk.
- 1990 Scotland: Dumfries.
- 1991 USA: Finlay, Ohio. (Euro Rally Germany, Hanover)
- 1992 Belgium, Ghent.
- 1993 Czech Republic, Prague.
- 1994 England, Peterborough.
- 1995 Netherlands, Haarlem.
- 1996 Germany, Wiesbaden Hesse.
- 1997 Switzerland, Appenzell.
- 1998 Austria, Zwettl.
- 1999 France, Blois.
- 2000 USA, Maryland.
- 2001 Czech Republic, Brno.
- 2002 Belgium, Roeselare.
- 2003 Australia, Beechworth and various locations.
- 2004 Austria, Rust, Burgenland.
- 2005 Germany, Bad Brückenau Bavaria.
- 2006 Canada, Waterloo (Euro Rally France).
- 2007 Netherlands, Oirschot.
- 2008 England, Beaulieu.
- 2009 Switzerland, Neuchâtel.
- 2010 Denmark, Møn.
- 2011 France, La Ferté-Imbault
- 2012 Belgium, Ghent
- 2013 Czech Republic, Veselí nad Moravou
- 2014 Hungary, Tiszakécske
- 2015 Sweden, Sölvesborg
- 2016 Russia, Moscow
- 2017 Germany Karlsruhe Baden-Wurtemberg – to celebrate the 200th anniversary of Karl Drais' invention
- 2018 Indonesia, Ubud and Denpasar /Bali
- 2019 England, Burton Constable Hall (Yorkshire)
- 2022 Belgium, Oostende
- 2023 Italia, Cremona
- 2024 Czech Republic, Ostrava
- 2025 France, Sully-sur-Loire
- 2026 Indonesia, Prambanan (Klaten)

== Future events ==
- 2027 Italy, Foligno
- 2028 Germany, Weinböhla
