= Yvoy-le-Marron =

- Commune
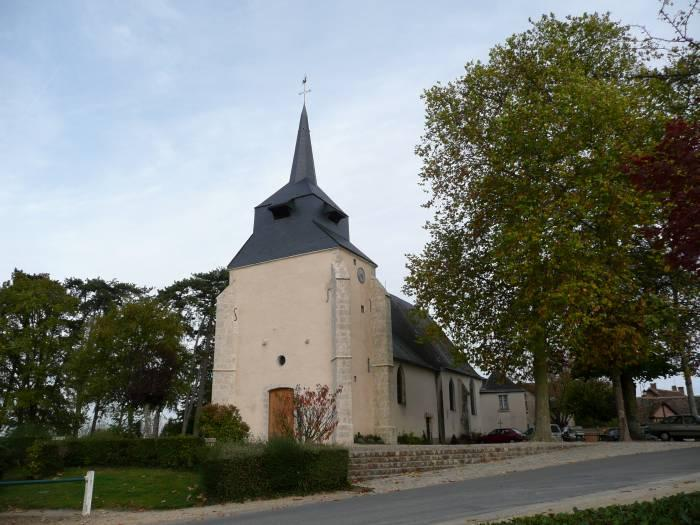
- Church of Saint-Caprais
- Location of Yvoy-le-Marron
- Location within France Location within Centre-Val de Loire
- Coordinates: 47°38′00″N 1°51′14″E
- Country: France
- Region: Centre-Val de Loire
- Department: Loir-et-Cher
- Arrondissement: Romorantin-Lanthenay
- Canton: La Sologne
- Intercommunality: Sologne des Étangs

Government
  - Mayor (2020–2026): Daniel Lombardi
- Area^{1}: 48.92 km^{2} (18.89 sq mi)
- Elevation: 127 m (417 ft)
- Highest elevation: 138 m (453 ft)
- Lowest elevation: 94 m (308 ft)
- Population (2023): 746
  - Density: 15.2/km^{2} (39.5/sq mi)
- Demonym(s): Capraisiens, Capraisiennes
- Time zone: UTC+01:00 (CET)
  - Summer (DST): UTC+02:00 (CEST)
- INSEE/Postal code: 41297 /41600
- ^{1} French Land Register data, which excludes lakes, ponds, glaciers > 1 km^{2} (0.386 sq mi or 247 acres) and river estuaries.

Yvoy-le-Marron (French pronunciation: [ivwa lə maʁɔ̃]) is a commune in the Loir-et-Cher department in central France.

== Population ==
Historical population
Year	Pop.	±% p.a.
1968	540	—
1975	544	+0.11%
1982	483	−1.68%
1990	494	+0.28%
1999	538	+0.95%
2007	603	+1.44%
2012	607	+0.13%
2017	728	+3.70%
2023	746	+0.41%
Source: INSEE

== See also ==
- Communes of the Loir-et-Cher department
