= Paris Commune =

1871 revolutionary city council in France

- Part of the aftermath of the siege of Paris in the Franco-Prussian War
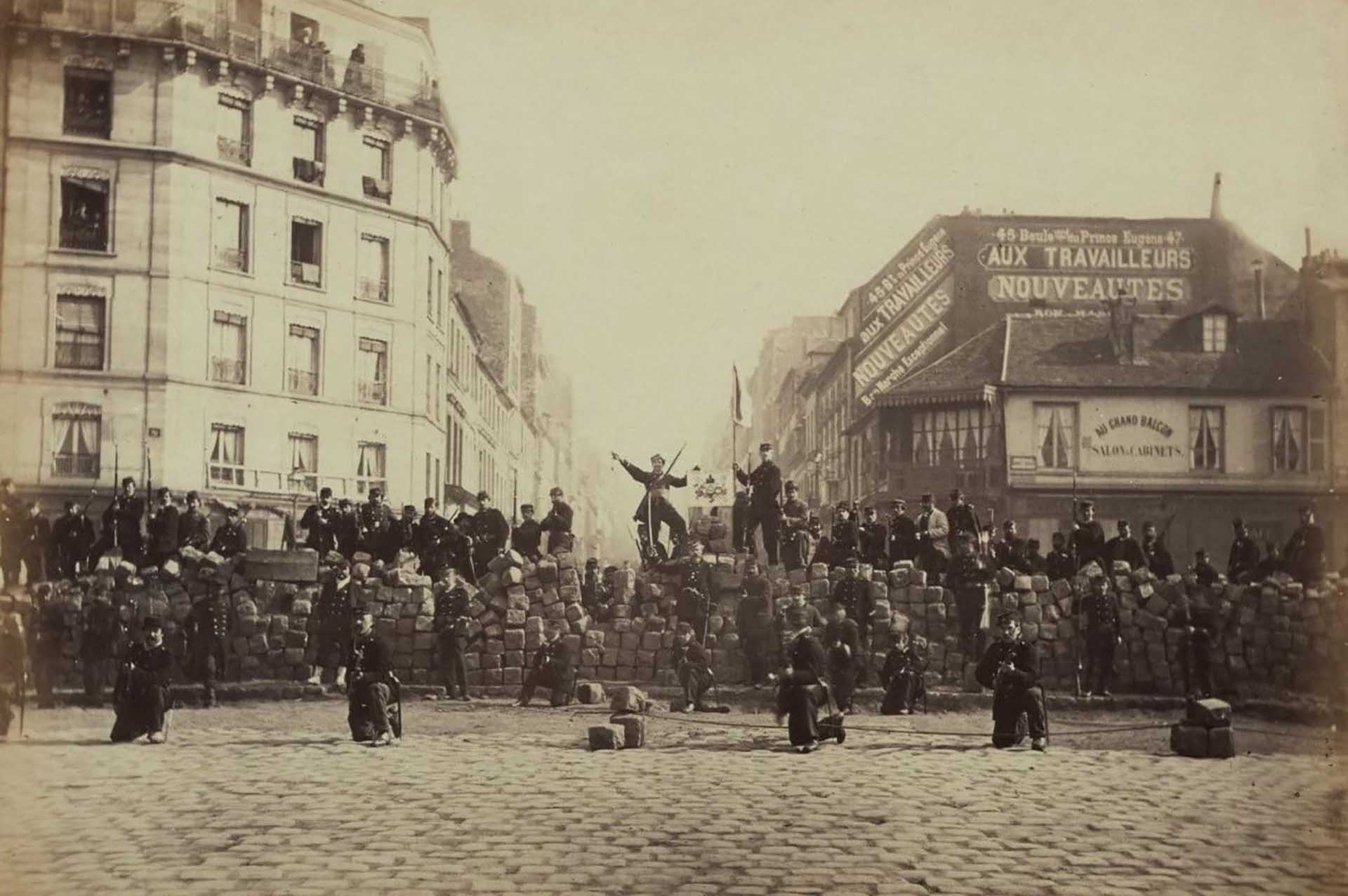
- A barricade thrown up by the Communard National Guard on 18 March 1871
Date	18 March – 28 May 1871 (2 months, 1 week and 3 days)
Location	Paris, France 48°51′24″N 2°21′08″E
Result	Revolt suppressed; Disbanding of the second National Guard by the French government

Belligerents
(France) French Republic: French Army	Communards; National Guard

Commanders and leaders
(French Third Republic) Patrice MacMahon; (French Third Republic) Joseph Vinoy; (French Third Republic) Gaston Galliffet; (French Third Republic) Ernest Cissey; (French Third Republic) Martin Daudel	Louis Delescluze †; Jarosław Dąbrowski †

Strength
170,000	25,000–50,000

Casualties and losses
987–1,162 killed 6,580–6,755 wounded 183 missing	6,667–20,000 killed 43,000 captured 6,500–7,500 fled abroad

The Paris Commune (French: Commune de Paris, pronounced [kɔ.myn də pa.ʁi]) was a French revolutionary government that seized power in Paris on 18 March 1871 and controlled parts of the city until 28 May 1871. During the Franco-Prussian War of 1870–1871, the French National Guard had defended Paris, and working class radicalism grew among its soldiers. Following the establishment of the French Third Republic in September 1870 (under French chief-executive Adolphe Thiers from February 1871) and the complete defeat of the French Army by the Germans by March 1871, soldiers of the National Guard seized control of the city on 18 March. The Communards killed two French Army generals and refused to accept the authority of the Third Republic; instead, the radicals set about establishing their own independent government.

The Commune governed Paris for two months, promoting policies that tended toward a progressive, anti-religious system, which was an eclectic mix of many 19th-century schools of thought. These policies included the separation of church and state, self-policing, the remission of rent, the abolition of child labor, and the right of employees to take over an enterprise deserted by its owner. The Commune closed all Catholic churches and schools in Paris. Feminism, communism, old-style social democracy (a mix of reformism and revolutionism) and anarchist/Proudhonist currents, among other socialist schools of thought, played important roles in the Commune.

The various Communards had little more than two months to achieve their respective goals before the national French Army suppressed the Commune during the semaine sanglante ("bloody week") beginning on 21 May 1871. The national forces still loyal to the Third Republic government either killed in battle or executed an estimated 10,000 to 15,000 Communards, though one unconfirmed estimate from 1876 put the toll as high as 20,000. In its final days the Commune executed the Archbishop of Paris, Georges Darboy, and about one hundred hostages, mostly gendarmes and priests.

National army forces took 43,522 Communards as prisoners, including 1,054 women. More than half of the prisoners had not fought, and were released immediately. The Third Republic tried around 15,000 in court, 13,500 of whom were found guilty; 95 were sentenced to death, 251 to forced labor, and 1,169 to deportation (mostly to New Caledonia). Many other Commune supporters, including several of the leaders, fled abroad, mostly to England, Belgium or Switzerland. All the surviving prisoners and exiles received pardons in 1880 and could return home, where some resumed political careers.

Debates over the policies and result of the Commune had significant influence on the ideas of Karl Marx and Friedrich Engels, who described the régime in Paris as the first example of the dictatorship of the proletariat. Engels wrote: "Of late, the Social-Democratic philistine has once more been filled with wholesome terror at the words: Dictatorship of the Proletariat. Well and good, gentlemen, do you want to know what this dictatorship looks like? Look at the Paris Commune. That was the Dictatorship of the Proletariat."

== Prelude ==
On 2 September 1870, France was defeated in the Battle of Sedan, and Emperor Napoleon III was captured. When the news reached Paris the next day, shocked and angry crowds came out into the streets. Empress Eugénie, the acting Regent, fled the city, and the government of the Second Empire swiftly collapsed. Republican and radical deputies of the National Assembly proclaimed the new French Republic, and formed a Government of National Defence with the intention of continuing the war. The Prussian army marched swiftly toward Paris.

=== Demographics ===
In 1871, France was deeply divided between the large rural, Catholic, and conservative population of the French countryside and the more republican and radical cities of Paris, Marseille, Lyon and a few others. In the first round of the 1869 parliamentary elections held under the French Empire, 4,438,000 had voted for the Bonapartist candidates supporting Napoleon III, while 3,350,000 had voted for the republicans or the legitimists. In Paris, however, the republican candidates dominated, winning 234,000 votes against 77,000 for the Bonapartists.

Of the two million people in Paris in 1869, according to the official census, there were about 500,000 industrial workers, or fifteen percent of all the industrial workers in France, plus another 300,000–400,000 workers in other enterprises. Only about 40,000 were employed in factories and large enterprises; most were employed in small industries in textiles, furniture, and construction. There were also 115,000 servants and 45,000 concierges. In addition to the native French population, there were about 100,000 immigrant workers and political refugees, the largest numbers being from Italy and Poland.

During the war and the Siege of Paris, various members of the middle and upper classes departed the city. At the same time, there was an influx of refugees from parts of France occupied by the Germans. The working class and immigrants suffered the most from the lack of industrial activity due to the war and the siege; they formed the bedrock of the Commune's popular support.

=== Radicalisation of the Paris workers ===
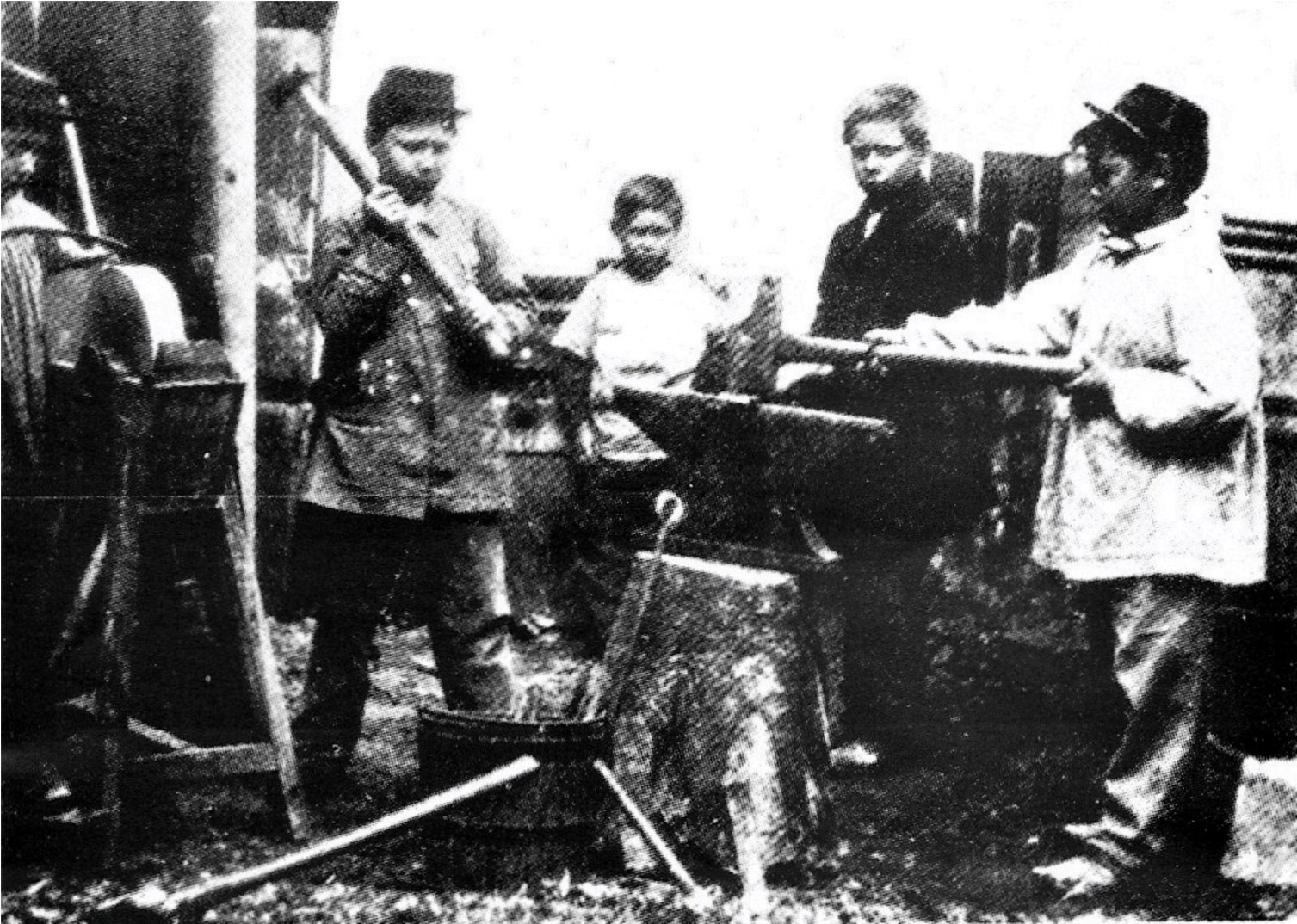
Children in factory at the forge under the Second French Empire

The Commune resulted in part from growing discontent among the Paris workers. This discontent can be traced to the first worker uprisings, the Canut revolts (a canut was a Lyonnais silk worker, often working on Jacquard looms), in Lyon and Paris in the 1830s. Many Parisians, especially workers and the lower-middle classes, supported a democratic republic. A specific demand was that Paris should be self-governing with its own elected council, something enjoyed by smaller French towns but denied to Paris by a national government wary of the capital's unruly populace.

Socialist movements, such as the First International, had been growing in influence; hundreds of societies across France were affiliated to it. In early 1867, Parisian employers of bronze-workers attempted to de-unionise their workers. This was defeated by a strike organised by the International. Later in 1867, a public demonstration in Paris was answered by the dissolution of its executive committee and the leadership being fined. Tensions escalated: Internationalists elected a new committee and put forth a more radical programme, the authorities imprisoned their leaders, and a more revolutionary perspective was taken to the International's 1868 Brussels Congress. The International had considerable influence even among unaffiliated French workers, particularly in Paris and the large cities.

The killing of journalist Victor Noir incensed Parisians, and the arrests of journalists critical of the Emperor did nothing to quiet the city. The German military attaché, Alfred von Waldersee, wrote in his diary in February:

"Every night, isolated barricades were thrown up, constructed for the most part out of disused conveyances, especially omnibuses, a few shots were fired at random, and scenes of disorder were taken part in by a few hundreds of persons, mostly quite young".

He noted, however, that "working-men, as a class, took no part in the proceedings." A coup was attempted in early 1870, but tensions eased significantly after the plebiscite in May. The war with Prussia, initiated by Napoleon III in July, was initially met with patriotic fervour.

=== Radicals and revolutionaries ===
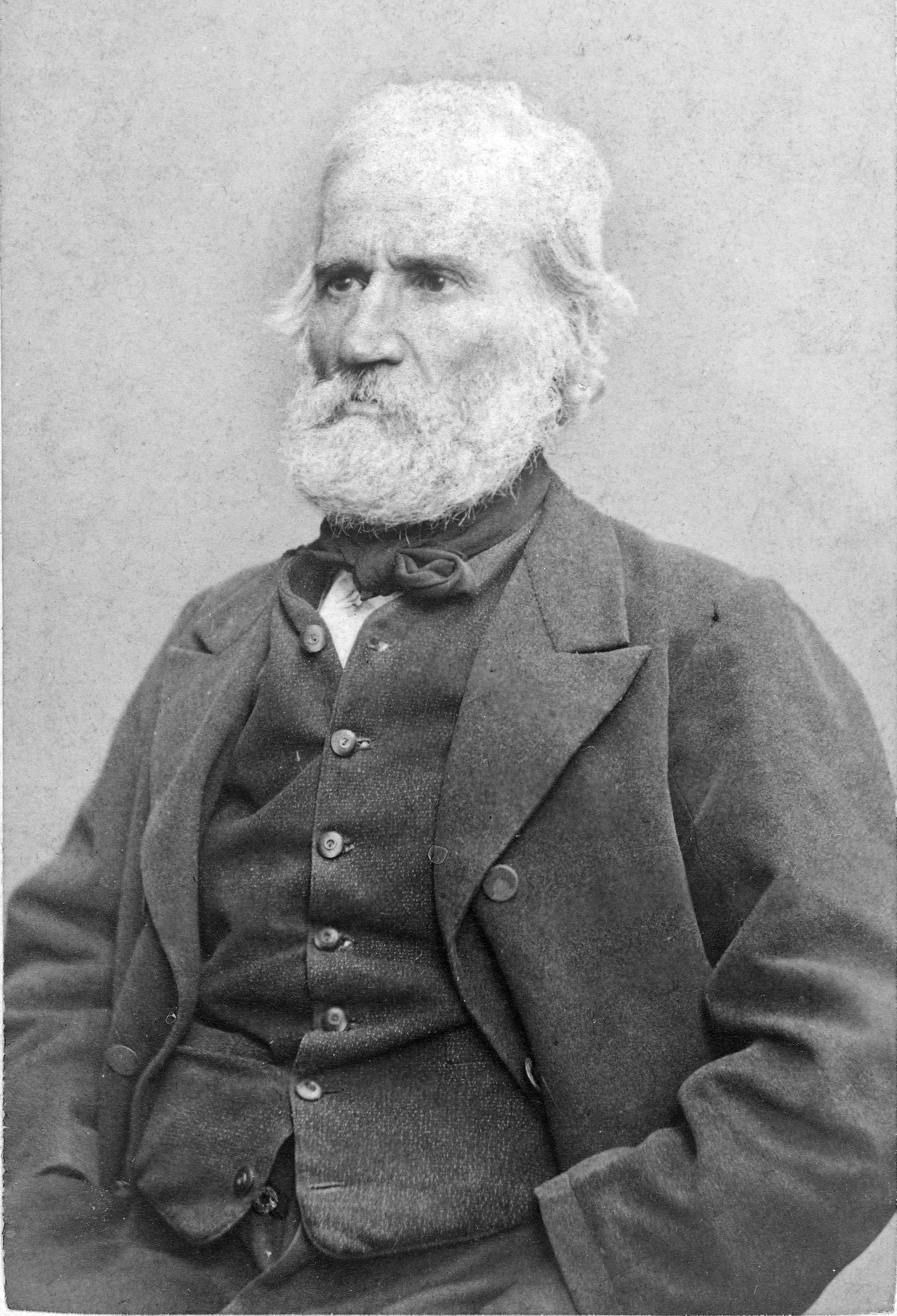
Louis Auguste Blanqui, leader of the Commune's far-left faction, was imprisoned for the entire time of the Commune.

Paris was the traditional home of French radical movements. Revolutionaries had gone into the streets and overthrown their governments during the popular uprisings of July 1830 and the French Revolution of 1848, as well as subsequent failed attempts such as the 1832 June Rebellion and the uprising of June 1848.

Of the radical and revolutionary groups in Paris at the time of the Commune, the most conservative were the "radical republicans". This group included the young doctor and future prime minister Georges Clemenceau, who was a member of the National Assembly and Mayor of the 18th arrondissement. Clemenceau tried to negotiate a compromise between the Commune and the government, but neither side trusted him. He was considered extremely radical by the provincial deputies of rural France, but too moderate by the leaders of the Commune.

The most extreme revolutionaries in Paris were the followers of Louis Auguste Blanqui, a charismatic professional revolutionary who had spent most of his adult life in prison. He had about a thousand followers, many of them armed and organized into cells of ten persons each. Each cell operated independently and was unaware of the members of the other groups, communicating only with their leaders by code. Blanqui had written a manual on revolution, Instructions for an Armed Uprising, to give guidance to his followers. Though their numbers were small, the Blanquists provided many of the most disciplined soldiers and several of the senior leaders of the Commune.

=== Defenders of Paris ===
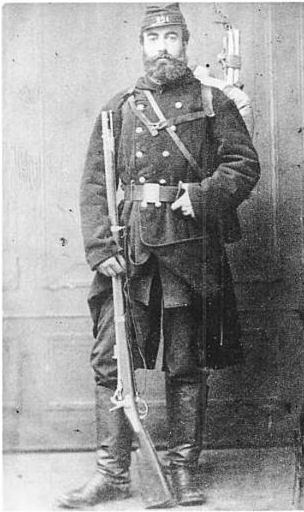
French National Guard soldier, 1870

By 20 September 1870, the Imperial German Army had surrounded Paris and was camped just 2,000 metres (6,600 ft) from the French front lines. The regular French Army in Paris, under General Trochu's command, had only 50,000 professional soldiers of the line; the majority of the French first-line soldiers were prisoners of war, or trapped in Metz, surrounded by the Germans. The regulars were thus supported by around 5,000 firemen, 3,000 gendarmes, and 15,000 sailors. The regulars were also supported by the Garde Mobile, new recruits with little training or experience. 17,000 of them were Parisian, and 73,000 from the provinces. These included twenty battalions of men from Brittany, who spoke little French.

The largest armed force in Paris was the National Guard, numbering about 300,000 men. They also had very little training or experience. They were organised by neighbourhoods. Those from the upper- and middle-class arrondissements tended to support the national government, while those from the working-class neighbourhoods were far more radical and politicised. Guardsmen from many units were known for their lack of discipline; some units refused to wear uniforms, often refused to obey orders without discussing them, and demanded the right to elect their own officers. The members of the National Guard from working-class neighbourhoods became the main armed force of the Commune.

=== Siege of Paris; first demonstrations ===
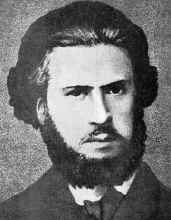
Eugène Varlin led several thousand National Guard soldiers to march to the Hôtel de Ville chanting "Long Live the Commune!"

As the Germans surrounded the city, radical groups saw that the Government of National Defence had few soldiers to defend itself, and launched the first demonstrations against it. On 19 September, National Guard units from the main working-class neighbourhoods—Belleville, Ménilmontant, La Villette, Montrouge, the Faubourg Saint-Antoine, and the Faubourg du Temple—marched to the centre of the city and demanded that a new government, a Commune, be elected. They were met by regular army units loyal to the Government of National Defence, and the demonstrators eventually dispersed peacefully. On 5 October, 5,000 protesters marched from Belleville to the Hôtel de Ville, demanding immediate municipal elections and rifles. On 8 October, several thousand soldiers from the National Guard, led by Eugène Varlin of the First International, marched to the centre chanting 'Long Live the Commune!", but they also dispersed without incident.

Later in October, General Louis-Jules Trochu launched a series of armed attacks to break the German siege, with heavy losses and no success. The telegraph line connecting Paris with the rest of France had been cut by the Germans on 27 September. On 6 October, Defense Minister Léon Gambetta departed the city by balloon to try to organise national resistance against the Germans.

=== Uprising of 31 October ===
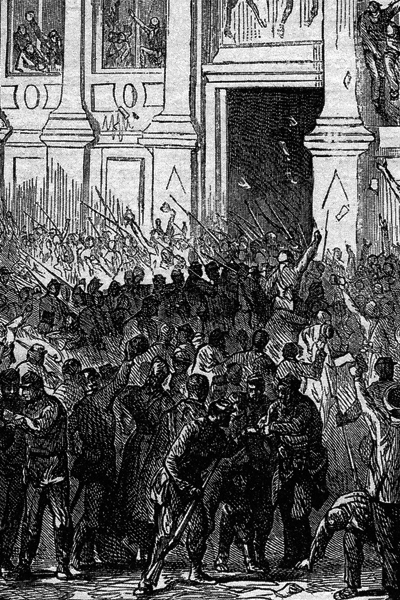
Revolutionary units of the National Guard briefly seized the Hôtel de Ville on 31 October 1870, but the uprising failed.

On 28 October, the news arrived in Paris that the 160,000 soldiers of the French army at Metz, which had been surrounded by the Germans since August, had surrendered. The news arrived the same day of the failure of another attempt by the French army to break the siege of Paris at Le Bourget, with heavy losses. On 31 October, the leaders of the main revolutionary groups in Paris, including Blanqui, Félix Pyat and Louis Charles Delescluze, called new demonstrations at the Hôtel de Ville against General Trochu and the government. Fifteen thousand demonstrators, some of them armed, gathered in front of the Hôtel de Ville in pouring rain, calling for the resignation of Trochu and the proclamation of a commune. Shots were fired from the Hôtel de Ville, one narrowly missing Trochu, and the demonstrators crowded into the building, demanding the creation of a new government, and making lists of its proposed members.

Blanqui, the leader of the most radical faction, established his own headquarters at the nearby Prefecture of the Seine, issuing orders and decrees to his followers, intent upon establishing his own government. While the formation of the new government was taking place inside the Hôtel de Ville, however, units of the National Guard and the Garde Mobile loyal to General Trochu arrived and recaptured the building without violence. By three o'clock, the demonstrators had been given safe passage and left, and the brief uprising was over.

On 3 November, city authorities organized a plebiscite of Parisian voters, asking if they had confidence in the Government of National Defence. "Yes" votes totalled 557,996, while 62,638 voted "no". Two days later, municipal councils in each of the twenty arrondissements of Paris voted to elect mayors; five councils elected radical opposition candidates, including Delescluze and a young Montmartrean doctor, Georges Clemenceau.

=== Negotiations with the Germans; continued war ===
In September and October, Adolphe Thiers, the leader of the National Assembly conservatives, had toured Europe, consulting with the foreign ministers of Britain, Russia, and Austria-Hungary, and found that none of them were willing to support France against the Germans. He reported to the government that there was no alternative to negotiating an armistice. He travelled to German-occupied Tours and met with Otto von Bismarck on 1 November. The German Chancellor demanded the cession of all of Alsace, parts of Lorraine, and enormous reparations. The Government of National Defence decided to continue the war and raise a new army to fight the Germans. The newly organized French armies won a single victory at Coulmiers on 10 November, but an attempt by General Auguste-Alexandre Ducrot on 29 November at Villiers to break out of Paris was defeated with a loss of 4,000 soldiers, compared with 1,700 German casualties.

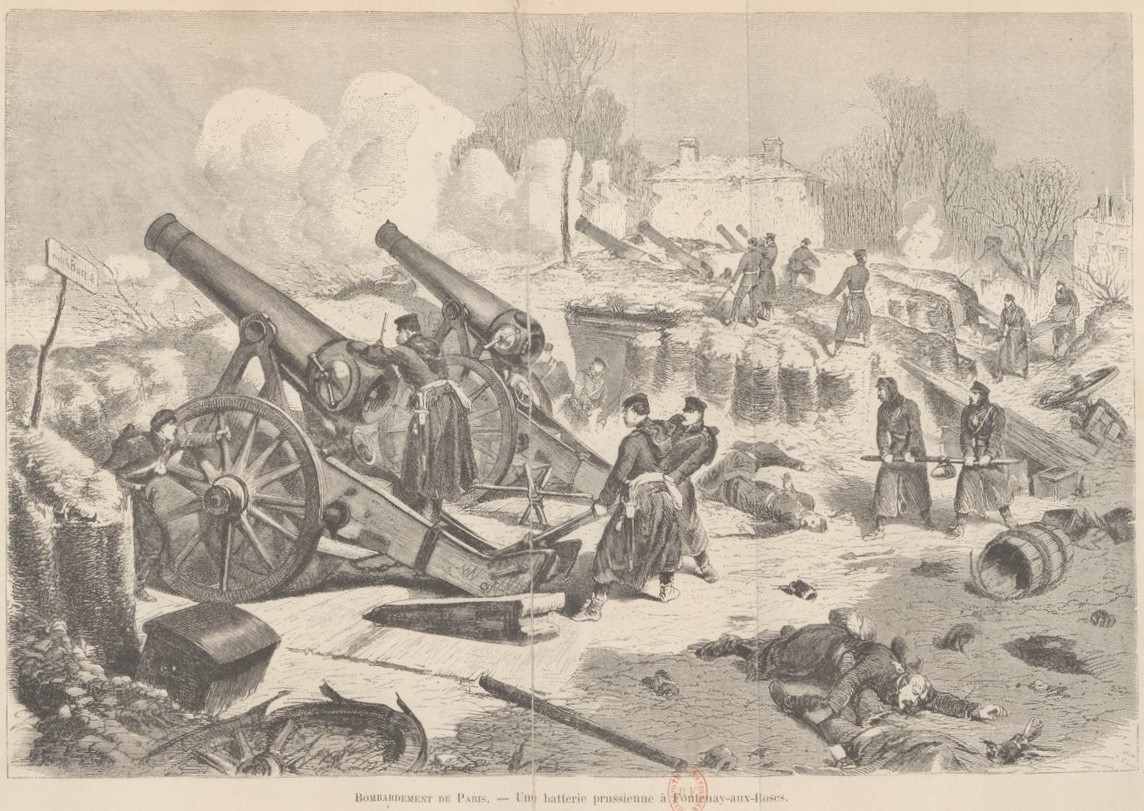
Bombardment of Paris by German artillery during the siege of Paris in 1870-1871

Everyday life for Parisians became increasingly difficult during the siege. In December, temperatures dropped to −15 °C (5 °F), and the Seine froze for three weeks. Parisians suffered shortages of food, firewood, coal and medicine. The city was almost completely dark at night. The only communication with the outside world was by balloon, carrier pigeon, or letters packed in iron balls floated down the Seine. Rumours and conspiracy theories abounded. Because supplies of ordinary food ran out, starving denizens ate most of the city zoo's animals, then resorted to feeding on rats.

By early January 1871, Bismarck and the Germans themselves were tired of the prolonged siege. They installed seventy-two 120- and 150-mm artillery pieces in the forts around Paris and on 5 January began to bombard the city day and night. Between 300 and 600 shells hit the city centre every day.

=== Uprising and armistice ===
Between 11 and 19 January 1871, the French armies had been defeated on four fronts and Paris was facing a famine. General Trochu received reports from the prefect of Paris that agitation against the government and military leaders was increasing in the political clubs and in the National Guard of the working-class neighbourhoods of Belleville, La Chapelle, Montmartre, and Gros-Caillou.

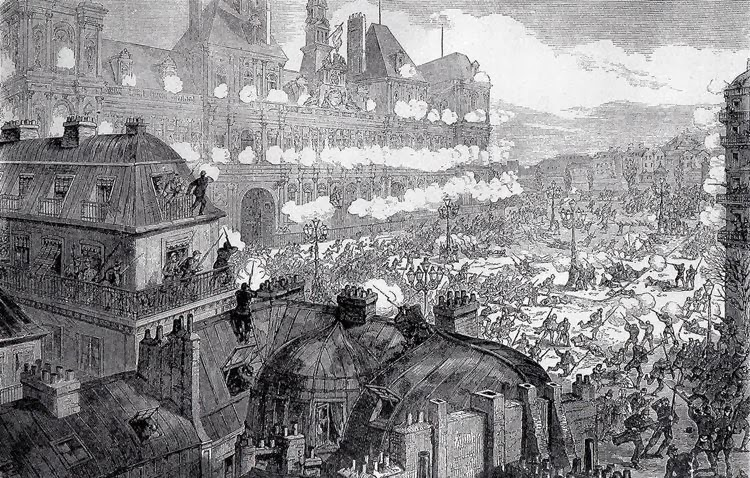
Uprising of 22 January 1871 at the Hôtel de Ville

At midday on 22 January, three or four hundred National Guards and members of radical groups—mostly Blanquists—gathered outside the Hôtel de Ville. A Garde Mobile battalion from Brittany was inside the building to defend it in case of an assault. The demonstrators presented their demands that the military be placed under civil control, and that there be an immediate election of a commune. The atmosphere was tense, and in the middle of the afternoon, gunfire broke out between the two sides; each side blamed the other for firing first. Six demonstrators were killed, and the army cleared the square. The government quickly banned two publications, Delescluze's Le Reveil and Pyat's Le Combat, and arrested 83 revolutionaries.

At the same time as the demonstration in Paris, the leaders of the Government of National Defence in Bordeaux had concluded that the war could not continue. On 26 January, they signed a ceasefire and armistice, with special conditions for Paris. The city would not be occupied by the Germans. Regular soldiers would give up their arms, but would not be taken into captivity. Paris would pay an indemnity of 200 million francs. At Jules Favre's request, Bismarck agreed not to disarm the National Guard, so that order could be maintained in the city.

=== Adolphe Thiers; parliamentary elections of 1871 ===
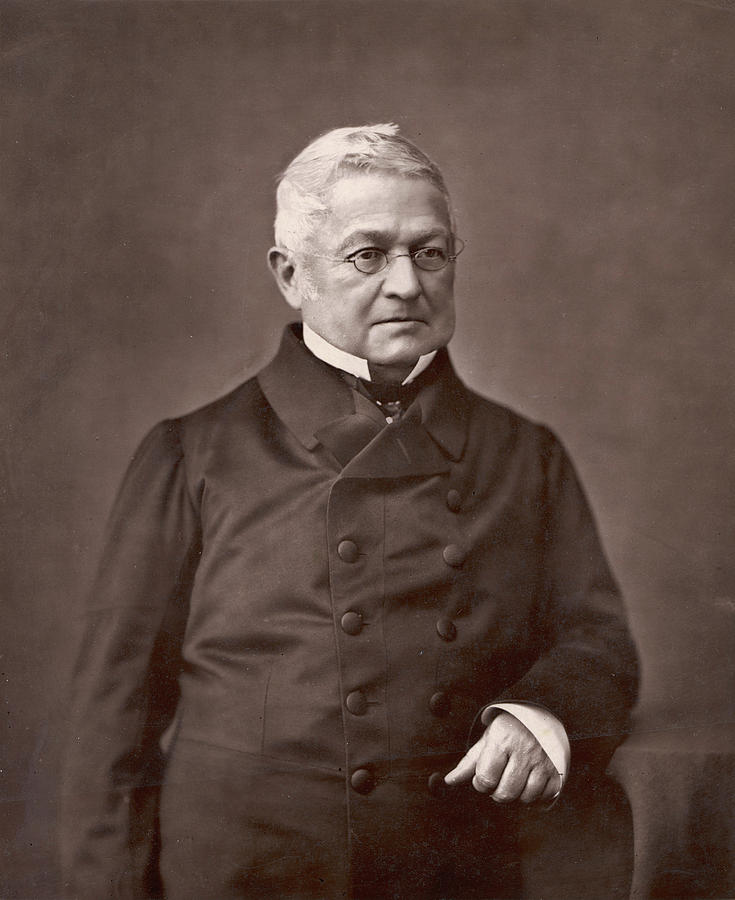
Adolphe Thiers, the chief executive of the French Government during the Commune

The national government in Bordeaux called for national elections at the end of January, held just ten days later on 8 February. Most electors in France were rural, Catholic and conservative, and this was reflected in the results; of the 645 deputies assembled in Bordeaux on February, about 400 favoured a constitutional monarchy under either Henri, Count of Chambord (grandson of Charles X) or Prince Philippe, Count of Paris (grandson of Louis Philippe).

Of the 200 republicans in the new parliament, 80 were former Orléanists (Philippe's supporters) and moderately conservative. They were led by Adolphe Thiers, who was elected in 26 departments, the most of any candidate. There were an equal number of more radical republicans, including Jules Favre and Jules Ferry, who wanted a republic without a monarch, and who felt that signing the peace treaty was unavoidable. Finally, on the extreme left, there were the radical republicans and socialists, a group that included Louis Blanc, Léon Gambetta and Georges Clemenceau. This group was dominant in Paris, where they won 37 of the 42 seats.

On 17 February the new parliament elected the 74-year-old Thiers as chief executive of the Third Republic. He was considered to be the candidate most likely to bring peace and to restore order. Long an opponent of the Prussian war, Thiers persuaded parliament that peace was necessary. He travelled to Versailles, where Bismarck and the German Emperor were waiting, and on 24 February the armistice was signed.

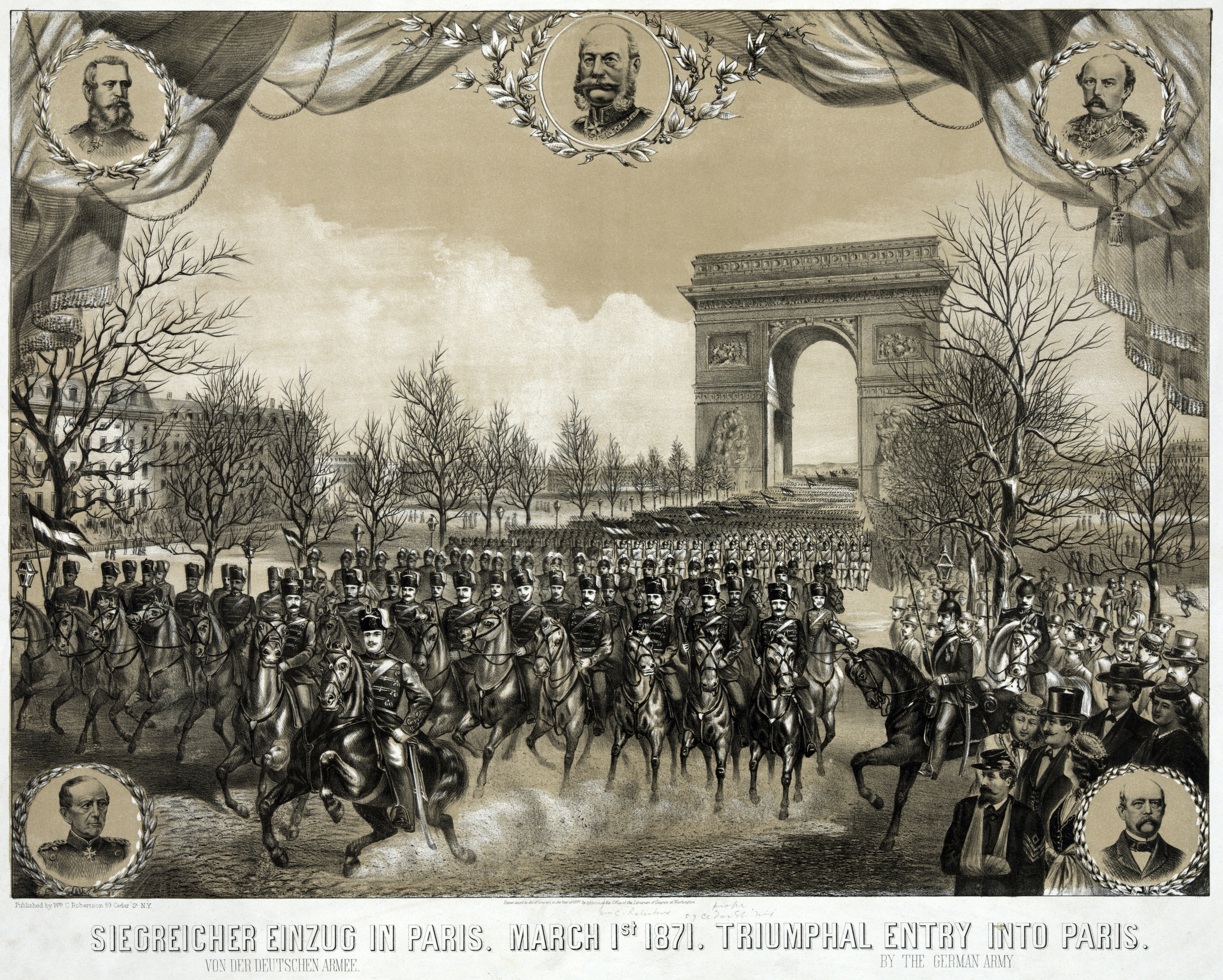
Triumphal entry of German troops into Paris on 1 March 1871, after the signing of the armistice

== Establishment ==
=== Dispute over cannons of Paris ===
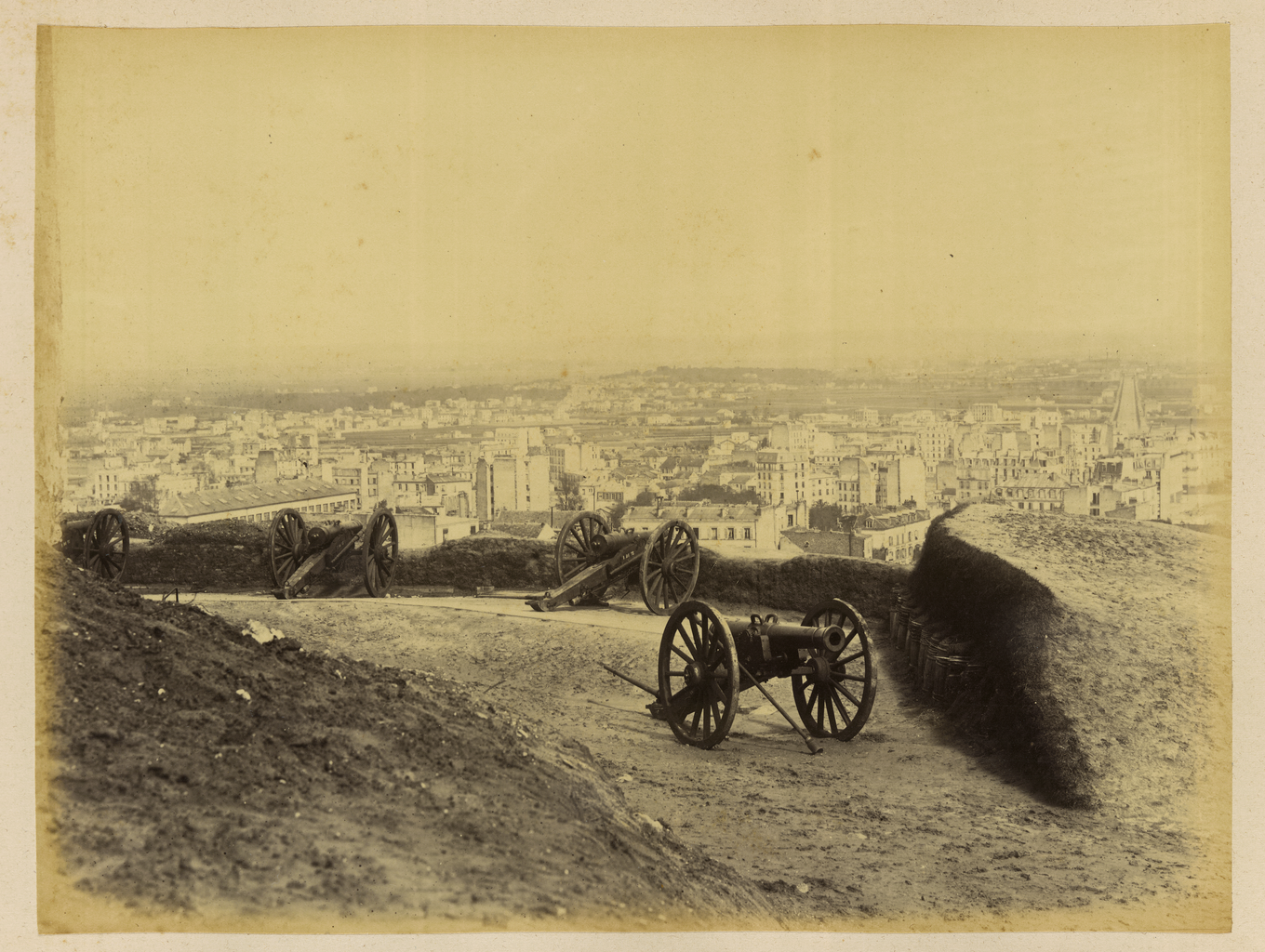
A Battery in the Montmartre Hill, paid for by the Parisians via a subscription

At the end of the war, 400 obsolete muzzle-loading bronze cannons, paid for by the Paris public via a subscription, remained in the city. The new Central Committee of the National Guard, now dominated by radicals, decided to put the cannons in parks in the working-class neighborhoods of Belleville, Buttes-Chaumont and Montmartre, to keep them away from the regular army and to defend the city against any attack by the national government. Thiers was equally determined to bring the cannons under national-government control.

Clemenceau, a friend of several revolutionaries, tried to negotiate a compromise; some cannons would remain in Paris and the rest go to the army. However, neither Thiers nor the National Assembly accepted his proposals. The chief executive wanted to restore order and national authority in Paris as quickly as possible, and the cannons became a symbol of that authority. The Assembly also refused to prolong the moratorium on debt collections imposed during the war; and suspended two radical newspapers, Le Cri du Peuple of Jules Vallès and Le Mot d'Ordre of Henri Rochefort, which further inflamed Parisian radical opinion. Thiers also decided to move the National Assembly and government from Bordeaux to Versailles, rather than to Paris, to be farther away from the pressure of demonstrations, which further enraged the National Guard and the radical political clubs.

On 17 March 1871, there was a meeting of Thiers and his cabinet, who were joined by Paris mayor Jules Ferry, National Guard commander General Louis d'Aurelle de Paladines and General Joseph Vinoy, commander of the regular army units in Paris. Thiers announced a plan to send the army the next day to take charge of the cannons. The plan was initially opposed by War Minister Adolphe Le Flô, d'Aurelle de Paladines, and Vinoy, who argued that the move was premature, because the army had too few soldiers and was undisciplined and demoralized and many units had become politicized and were unreliable. Vinoy urged that they wait until Germany had released the French prisoners of war, and the army returned to full strength. Thiers insisted that the planned operation must go ahead as quickly as possible, to have the element of surprise. If the seizure of the cannons was not successful, the government would withdraw from the centre of Paris, build up its forces, and then attack with overwhelming force, as they had done during the uprising of June 1848. The Council accepted his decision, and Vinoy gave orders for the operation to begin the next day.

=== Failed seizure attempt and government retreat ===
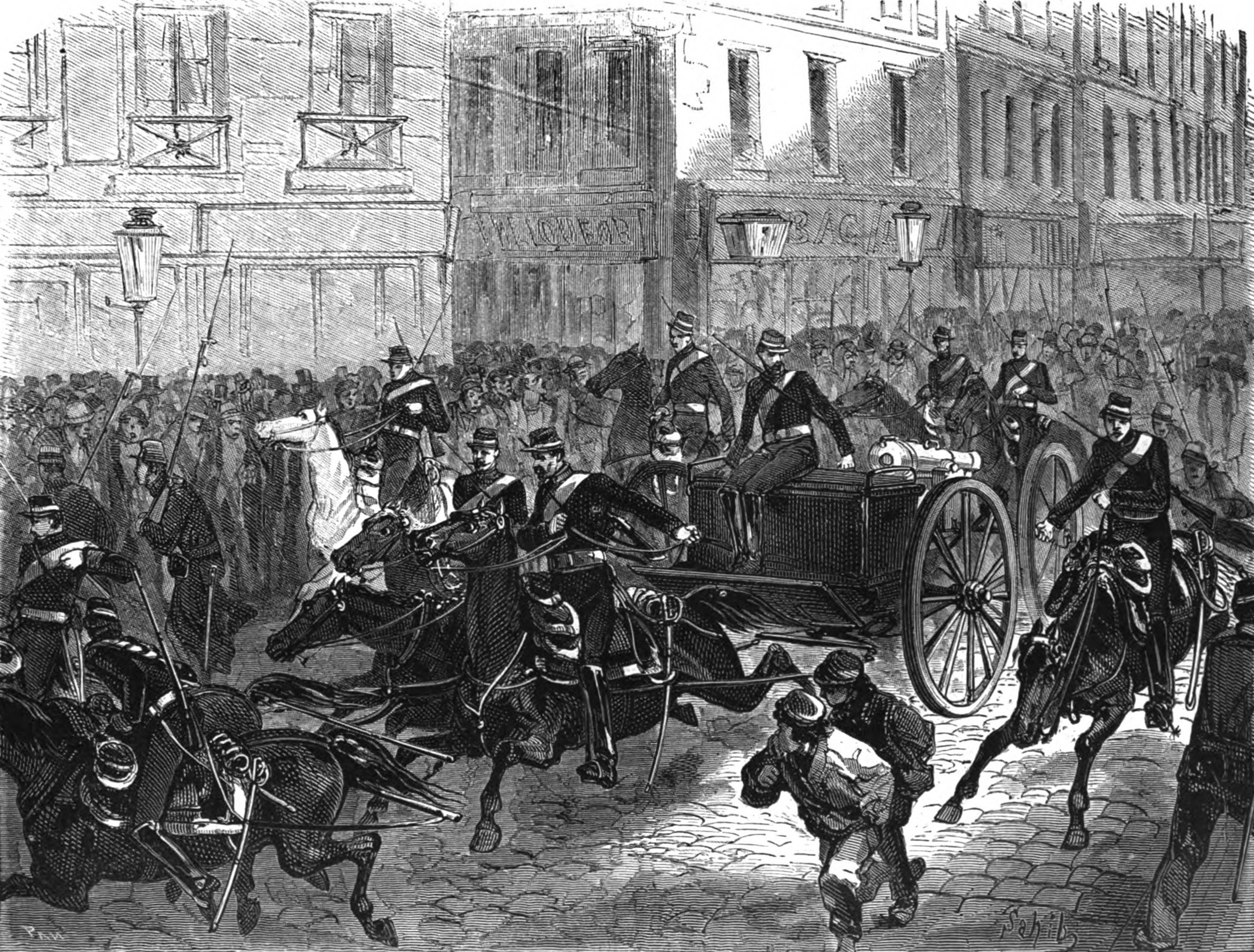
Troops sent by Adolphe Thiers seizing the cannons of Montmartre, paid for by the Parisians via a subscription. These were later taken back by the National Guards during the uprising of 18 March 1871, the starting point of the Paris Commune.

Early in the morning of 18 March, two brigades of soldiers climbed the butte of Montmartre, where the largest collection of cannons, 170 in number, were located. A small group of revolutionary national guardsmen were already there, and there was a brief confrontation between the brigade led by General Claude Lecomte, and the National Guard; one guardsman, named Turpin, was shot, later dying. Word of the shooting spread quickly, and members of the National Guard from all over the neighbourhood, along with others including Clemenceau, hurried to the site to confront the soldiers.

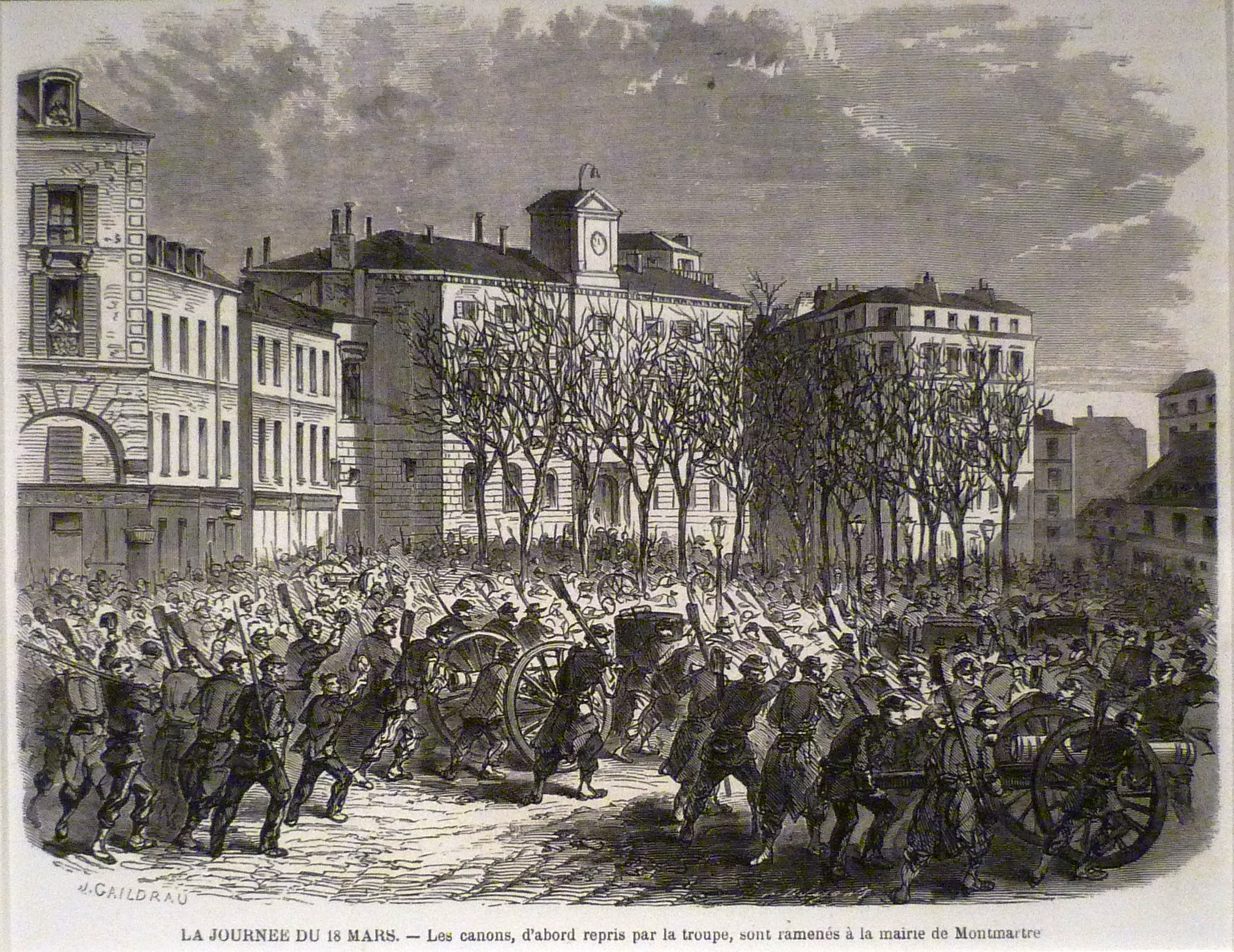
Cannons taken back from the army by the national guards

While the Army had succeeded in securing the cannons at Belleville and Buttes-Chaumont and other strategic points, at Montmartre a crowd gathered and continued to grow, and the situation grew increasingly tense. The horses that were needed to take the cannons away did not arrive, and the army units were immobilized. As the soldiers were surrounded, they began to break ranks and join the crowd. General Lecomte tried to withdraw, and then ordered his soldiers to load their weapons and fix bayonets. He thrice ordered them to fire, but the soldiers refused. Some of the officers were disarmed and taken to the city hall of Montmartre, under the protection of Clemenceau. General Lecomte and his staff officers were seized by the guardsmen and his mutinous soldiers and taken to the local headquarters of the National Guard under the command of captain Simon Charles Mayer at the ballroom of the Château Rouge. The officers were pelted with rocks, struck, threatened, and insulted by the crowd. In the middle of the afternoon, Lecomte and the other officers were taken to 6 rue des Rosiers by members of a group calling themselves the Committee of Vigilance of the 18th arrondissement, who demanded that they be tried and executed.

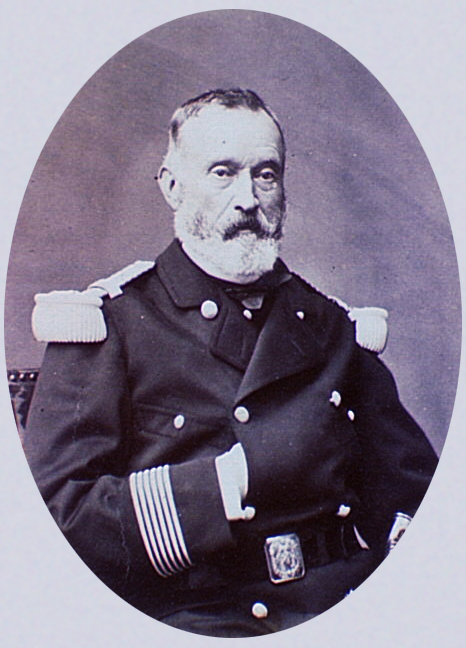
General Clément-Thomas, executed by the National Guards for trying to seize their cannons

At 5:00 in the afternoon, the National Guard had captured another important prisoner: General Jacques Leon Clément-Thomas. An ardent republican and fierce disciplinarian, he had helped suppress the armed uprising of June 1848 against the Second Republic. Because of his republican beliefs, he had been arrested by Napoleon III and exiled, and had only returned to France after the downfall of the Empire. He was particularly hated by the national guardsmen of Montmartre and Belleville because of the severe discipline he imposed during the siege of Paris. Earlier that day, dressed in civilian clothes, he had been trying to find out what was going on, when he was recognized by a soldier and arrested, and brought to the building at rue des Rosiers. At about 5:30 on 18 March, the angry crowd of national guardsmen and deserters from Lecomte's regiment at rue des Rosiers seized Clément-Thomas, beat him with rifle butts, pushed him into the garden, and shot him repeatedly. A few minutes later, they did the same to General Lecomte. Doctor Jean Casimir Félix Guyon, who examined the bodies shortly afterwards, found forty bullets in Clément-Thomas's body and nine in Lecomte's back. By late morning, the operation to recapture the cannons had failed, and crowds and barricades were appearing in all the working-class neighborhoods of Paris. General Vinoy ordered the army to pull back to the Seine, and Thiers began to organise a withdrawal to Versailles, where he could gather enough troops to take back Paris.

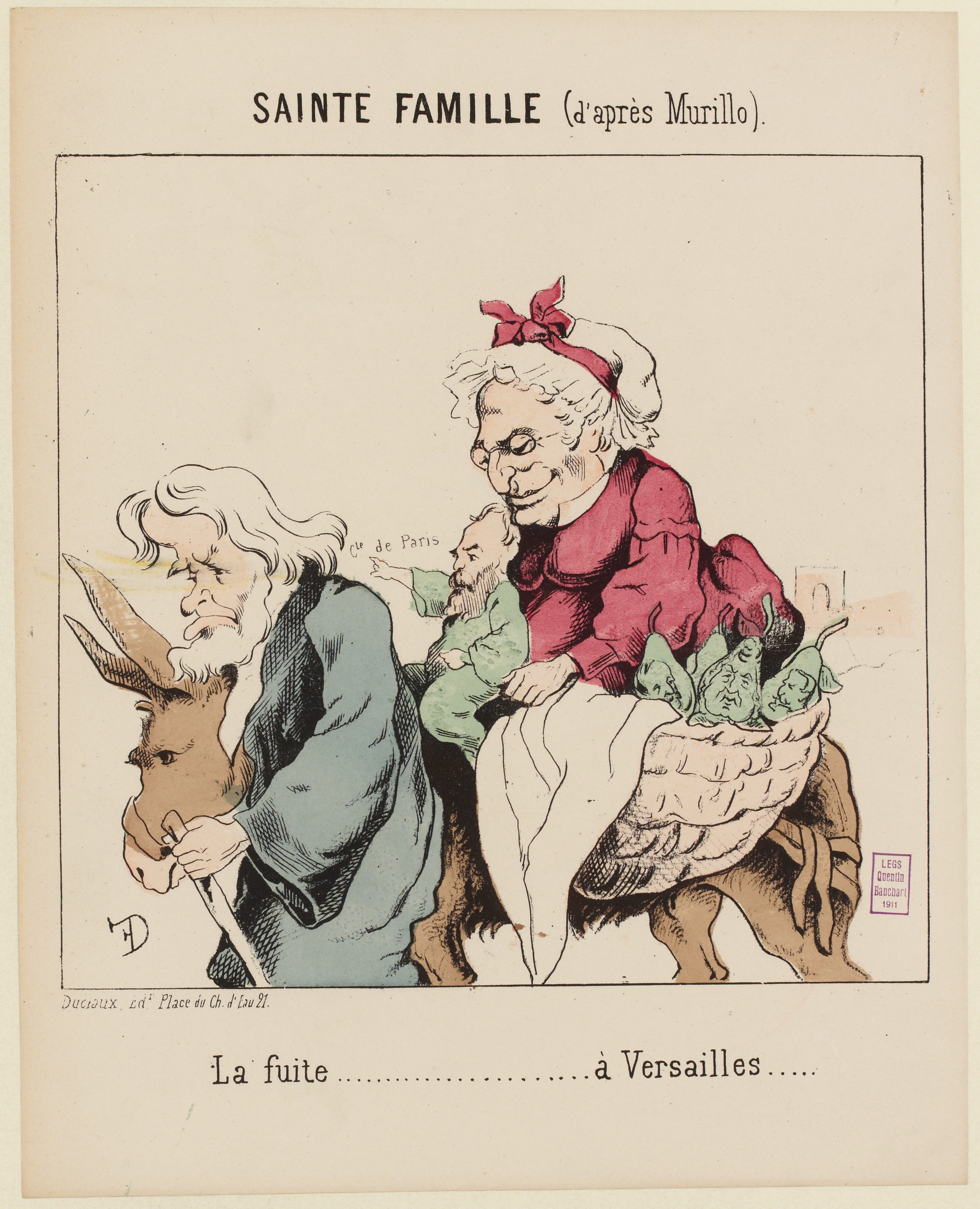
"The Holy Family": Thiers, Favre and Philippe d'Orléans, Count of Paris and pretender to the throne, fleeing to Versailles, caricature by Charles de Frondat

On the afternoon of 18 March, following the government's failed attempt to seize the cannons at Montmartre, the Central Committee of the National Guard ordered the three battalions to seize the Hôtel de Ville, where they believed the government was located. They were not aware that Thiers, the government, and the military commanders were at the Ministry of Foreign Affairs, where the gates were open and there were few guards. They were also unaware that Marshal Patrice de MacMahon, the future commander of the forces against the Commune, had just arrived at his home in Paris, having just been released from imprisonment in Germany. As soon as he heard the news of the uprising, he made his way to the railway station, where national guardsmen were already stopping and checking the identity of departing passengers. A sympathetic station manager hid him in his office and helped him board a train, and he escaped the city. While he was at the railway station, national guardsmen sent by the Central Committee arrived at his house looking for him.

On the advice of General Vinoy, Thiers ordered the evacuation to Versailles of all the regular forces in Paris, some 40,000 soldiers, including those in the fortresses around the city; the regrouping of all the army units in Versailles; and the departure of all government ministries from the city.

=== National Guard takes power ===
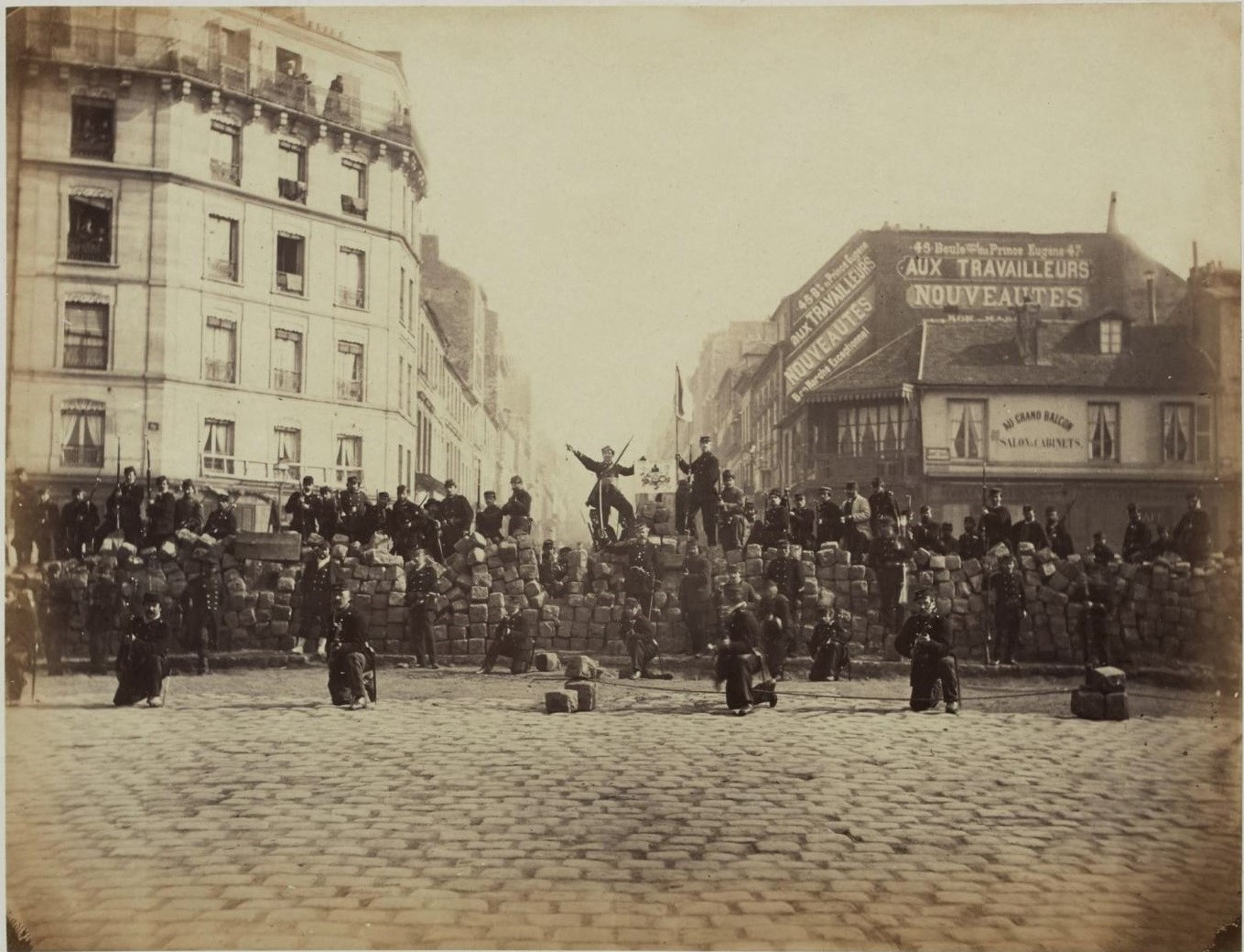
A barricade thrown up by national guards on 18 March 1871

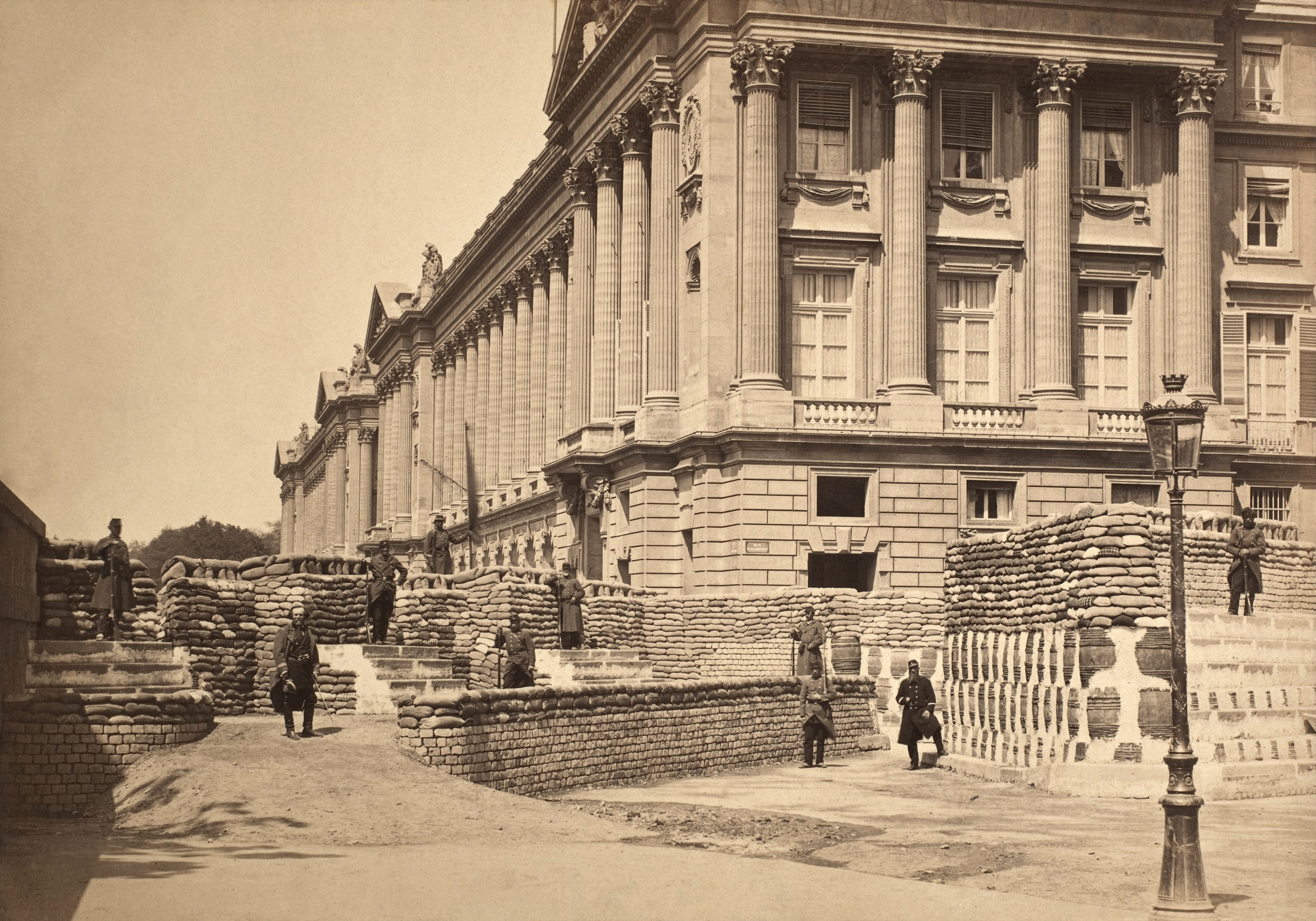
Barricades during the Paris Commune, near the Place de la Concorde

In February, while the national government had been organising in Bordeaux, a new rival government had been organised in Paris. The National Guard had not been disarmed as per the armistice, and had on paper 260 battalions of 1,500 men each, a total of 390,000 men. Between 15 and 24 February, some 500 delegates elected by the National Guard began meeting in Paris. On 15 March, just before the confrontation between the National Guard and the regular army over the cannons, 1,325 delegates of the federation of organisations created by the National Guard elected a leader, Giuseppe Garibaldi (who was in Italy and respectfully declined the title), and created a Central Committee of 38 members, which made its headquarters in a school on the rue Basfroi, between Place de la Bastille and Rue de la Roquette. The first vote of the new Central Committee was to refuse to recognise the authority of General D'Aurelle de Paladines, the official commander of the National Guard appointed by Thiers, or of General Vinoy, the Military Governor of Paris.

Late on 18 March, when they learned that the regular army was leaving Paris, units of the National Guard moved quickly to take control of the city. The first to take action were the followers of Blanqui, who went quickly to the Latin Quarter and took charge of the gunpowder stored in the Panthéon, and to the Orléans railway station. Four battalions crossed the Seine and captured the prefecture of police, while other units occupied the former headquarters of the National Guard at the Place Vendôme, as well as the Ministry of Justice. That night, the National Guard occupied the offices vacated by the government. They quickly took over the Ministries of Finance, the Interior, and War. At 8:00 in the morning the next day, the Central Committee was meeting in the Hôtel de Ville. By the end of that day, 20,000 national guardsmen were camped in triumph in the square in front of the Hôtel de Ville, with several dozen cannons. A red flag was hoisted over the building.

The extreme-left members of the Central Committee, led by the Blanquists, demanded an immediate march on Versailles to disperse the Thiers government and to impose their authority on all of France; but the majority first wanted to establish a more solid base of legal authority in Paris. The Committee officially lifted the state of siege, named commissions to administer the government, and called elections for 23 March. They also sent a delegation of mayors of the Paris arrondissements, led by Clemenceau, to negotiate with Thiers in Versailles to obtain a special independent status for Paris.

On 22 March 1871, demonstrators holding banners declaring them to be "Friends of Peace" were blocked from entering the Place Vendôme by guardsmen who, after being fired on, opened fire on the crowd. At least 12 people were killed and many wounded. The event was labeled the Massacre in the Rue de la Paix.

=== Council elections ===
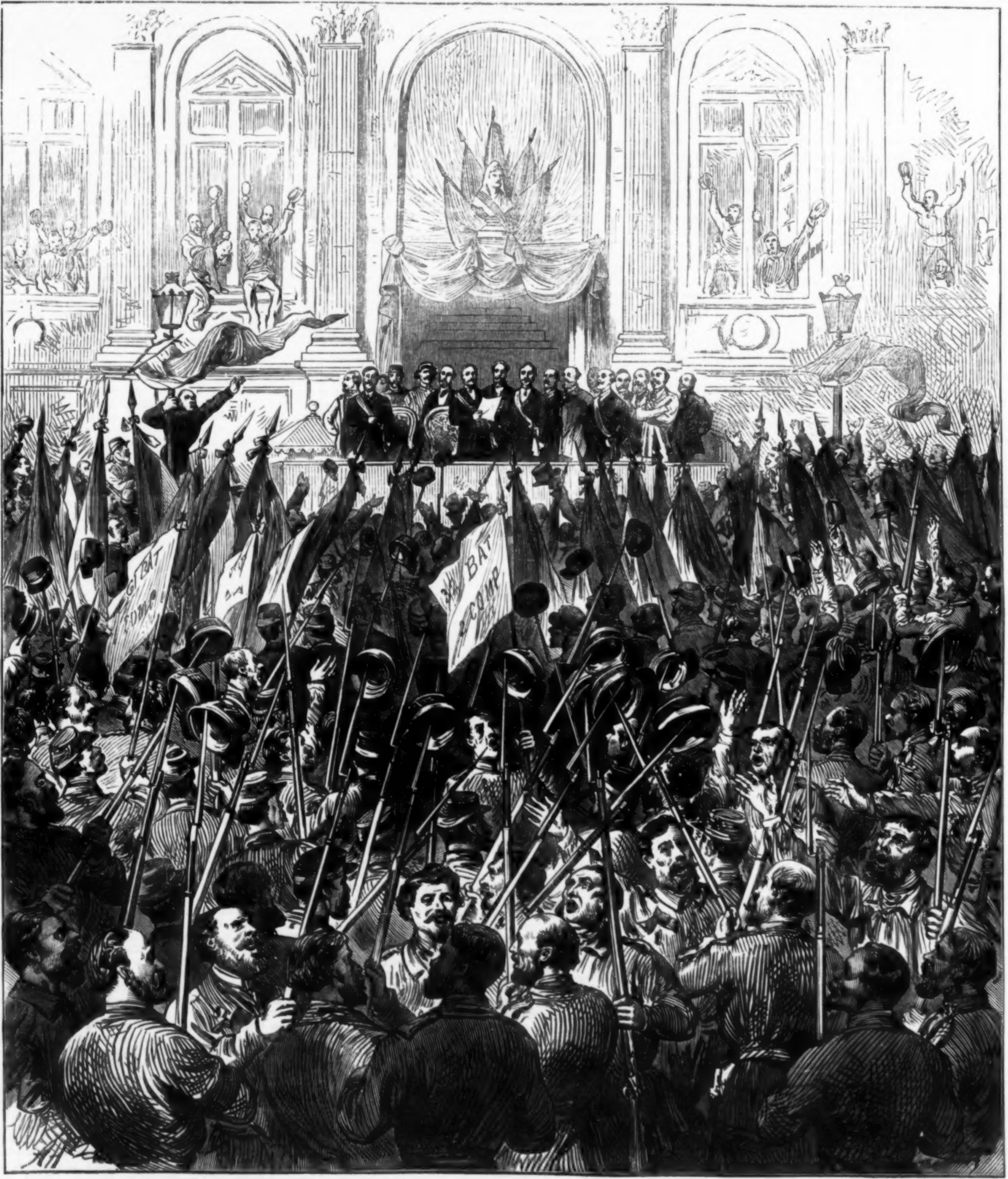
The Commune in Paris Sketch at the Hotel De Ville

In Paris, hostility was growing between the elected republican mayors, including Clemenceau, who believed that they were legitimate leaders of Paris, and the Central Committee of the National Guard. On 22 March, the day before the elections, the Central Committee declared that it, not the mayors, was the legitimate government of Paris. It declared that Clemenceau was no longer the Mayor of Montmartre, and seized the city hall there, as well as the city halls of the 1st and 2nd arrondissements, which were occupied by more radical national guardsmen. "We are caught between two bands of crazy people," Clemenceau complained, "those sitting in Versailles and those in Paris."

The elections of 26 March elected a Commune council of 92 members, one for every 20,000 residents. Ahead of the elections, the Central Committee and the leaders of the International gave out their lists of candidates, mostly belonging to the extreme left. The candidates had only a few days to campaign. Thiers' government in Versailles urged Parisians to abstain from voting. When the voting was finished, 233,000 Parisians had voted, out of 485,000 registered voters, or forty-eight percent. In upper-class neighborhoods many abstained from voting: 77 percent of voters in the 7th and 8th arrondissements; 68 percent in the 15th, 66 percent in the 16th, and 62 percent in the 6th and 9th. But in the working-class neighborhoods, turnout was high: 76 percent in the 20th arrondissement, 65 percent in the 19th, and 55 to 60 percent in the 10th, 11th, and 12th.

A few candidates, including Blanqui (who had been arrested when outside Paris, and was in prison in Brittany), won in several arrondissements. Other candidates who were elected, including about twenty moderate republicans and five radicals, refused to take their seats. In the end, the council had just 60 members. Nine of the winners were Blanquists (some of whom were also from the International); twenty-five, including Delescluze and Pyat, classified themselves as "Independent Revolutionaries"; about fifteen were from the International; the rest were from a variety of radical groups. One of the best-known candidates, Clemenceau, received only 752 votes. The professions represented in the council were 33 workers; five small businessmen; 19 clerks, accountants and other office staff; twelve journalists; and a selection of workers in the liberal arts. 20 members were Freemasons. All were men; women were not allowed to vote. The winners were announced on 27 March, and a large ceremony and parade by the National Guard was held the next day in front of the Hôtel de Ville, decorated with red flags.

=== Organisation and early work ===
The new Commune held its first meeting on 28 March in a euphoric mood. The members adopted a dozen proposals, including an honorary presidency for Blanqui; the abolition of the death penalty; the abolition of military conscription; a proposal to send delegates to other cities to help launch communes there; and a resolution declaring that membership in the Paris Commune was incompatible with being a member of the National Assembly. This was aimed particularly at Pierre Tirard, the republican mayor of the 2nd arrondissement, who had been elected to both Commune and National Assembly. Seeing the more radical political direction of the new Commune, Tirard and some twenty republicans decided it was wisest to resign from the Commune. A resolution was also passed, after a long debate, that the deliberations of the council were to be secret, since the Commune was effectively at war with the government in Versailles and should not make its intentions known to the enemy.

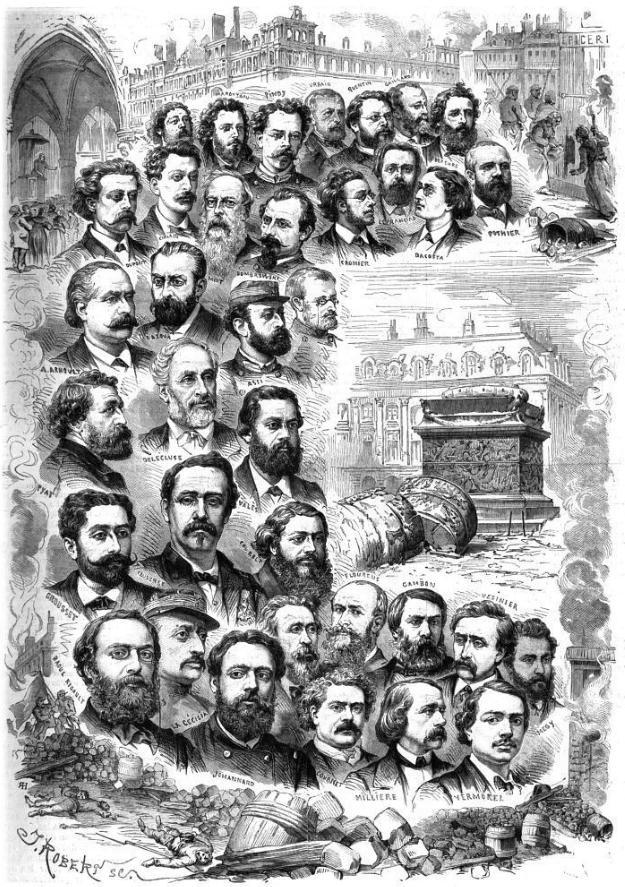
"The men of the Commune" in L'Illustration magazine, July 1871

Following the model proposed by the more radical members, the new government had no president, no mayor, and no commander in chief. The Commune began by establishing nine commissions, similar to those of the National Assembly, to manage the affairs of Paris. The commissions in turn reported to an Executive Commission. One of the first measures passed declared that military conscription was abolished, that no military force other than the National Guard could be formed or introduced into the capital, and that all healthy male citizens were members of the National Guard. The new system had one important weakness: the National Guard now had two different commanders. They reported to both the Central Committee of the National Guard and to the Executive Commission, and it was not clear which one was in charge of the inevitable war with Thiers' government.

== Administration and actions ==
Paris Commune of
France
- Revolutionary socialist government in Paris
- Formation: 18 March, 1871
- Extinction: 28 May, 1871
- Country: France
Legislative branch
- Commune Council: Central Committee and Executive Commission
- Chair: Louis Charles Delescluze
Executive branch
- Jarosław Dąbrowski: Commander-in-Chief of the National Guard
- Commune de Paris
- Type: Provisional socialist government
- Status: Disestablished
- Seat: Paris
- Appointer: Commune Council
- Constituting instrument: Committee of Public Safety (1871)
- Formation: 18 March 1871
- Abolished: 28 May 1871
- Succession: Government of National Defense

=== Programme ===
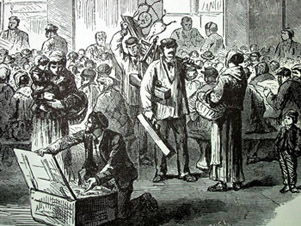
The Commune returns workmen's tools pawned during the siege.

The Commune adopted the discarded French Republican calendar during its brief existence and used the socialist red flag rather than the republican tricolor. Despite internal differences, the council began to organise public services for the city which at the time consisted of two million residents. It also reached a consensus on certain policies that tended towards a progressive, secular, and social democracy. Because the Commune only existed for two months before it was suppressed, only a few decrees were actually implemented. The decrees included:

- Remission of rents owed for the entire period of the siege (during which payment had been suspended);
- abolition of child labour and night work in bakeries;
- granting of pensions to the unmarried companions and children of national guardsmen killed in active service;
- free return by pawnshops of all workmen's tools and household items, valued up to 20 francs, pledged during the siege;
- postponement of commercial debt obligations, and the abolition of interest on the debts;
- right of employees to take over and run an enterprise if it were deserted by its owner; the Commune, nonetheless, recognised the previous owner's right to compensation;
- Prohibition of fines imposed by employers on their workmen.

=== Feminist initiatives ===
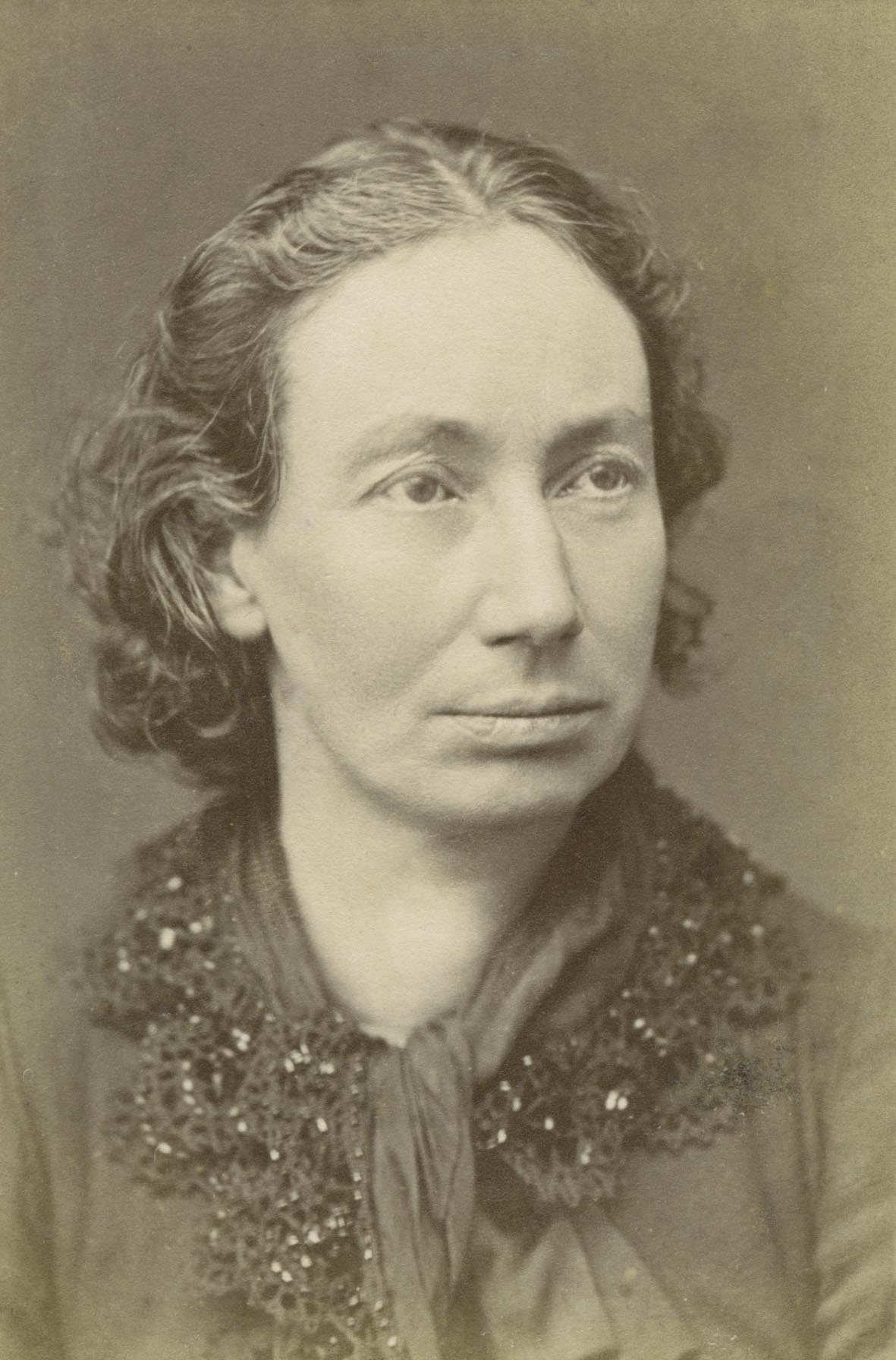
Louise Michel, anarchist and famed "Red Virgin of Montmartre", became an important part of the legend of the Commune.

Women played an important role in both the initiation and the governance of the Commune, though women could not vote in the Commune elections and there were no elected women members of the Commune itself. Their participation included building barricades and caring for wounded fighters. Joséphine Marchais, a washerwoman, picked up a gun during the battles of 22–23 May and said, "You cowardly crew! Go and Fight! If I'm killed it will be because I've done some killing first!" She was arrested as an incendiary, but there is no documentation that she was a pétroleuse (female arsonist). She worked as a vivandière with the Enfants perdus. While carrying back the laundry she was given by the guardsmen, she carried away the body of her lover, Jean Guy, who was a butcher's apprentice. There were reports in various newspapers of female arsonists, but evidence remains weak. The Paris Journal reported that soldiers arrested 13 women who allegedly threw petrol into houses. There were rumours that pétroleuses were paid 10 francs per house. While it was clear that communard arsonists burned the Tuileries Palace, the Hotel de Ville and other landmarks, the reports of women participating were exaggerated at the time.

Some women organised a feminist movement, following earlier attempts in 1789 and 1848. Thus, Nathalie Lemel, a socialist bookbinder, and Elisabeth Dmitrieff, a young Russian exile and member of the Russian section of the First International, created the Women's Union for the Defence of Paris and Care of the Wounded on 11 April 1871. The feminist writer André Léo, a friend of Paule Mink, was also active in the Women's Union. Believing that the situation of women could only be improved through a global struggle against capitalism, the association demanded gender and wage equality, the right of divorce for women, the right to secular education, and professional education for girls. They also demanded suppression of the distinction between married women and concubines, and between legitimate and illegitimate children. They advocated the abolition of prostitution (obtaining the closing of the maisons de tolérance, or legal brothels). The Women's Union also participated in several municipal commissions and organised cooperative workshops. Along with Eugène Varlin, Nathalie Lemel created the cooperative restaurant La Marmite, which served free food for indigents, and then fought during the Bloody Week on the barricades.

Paule Minck opened a free school in the Church of Saint-Pierre de Montmartre and ran the Club de la Victoire in the Church of Saint-Sulpice on the Left Bank. The Russian Anne Jaclard, who declined to marry Fyodor Dostoevsky and finally became the wife of Blanquist activist Victor Jaclard, founded the newspaper La Sociale with André Léo. She was also a member of the Comité de vigilance de Montmartre, along with Louise Michel and Paule Minck, as well as of the Russian section of the First International. Victorine Brocher, close to the IWA activists, and founder of a cooperative bakery in 1867, also fought during the Commune and the Bloody Week. Louise Michel, who would later be deported to New Caledonia, was one of those who symbolised the active participation of a small number of women in the insurrectionary events. A women's battalion of the National Guard defended the Place Blanche during the repression.

=== Bank of France ===
The Commune named François Jourde as the head of the Commission of Finance. A former clerk of a notary, accountant in a bank and employee of the city's bridges and roads department, Jourde maintained the Commune's accounts with prudence. Paris's tax receipts amounted to 20 million francs, with another six million seized at the Hôtel de Ville. The expenses of the Commune were 42 million, the largest part going to pay the daily salary of the National Guard. Jourde first obtained a loan from the Rothschild Bank, then paid the bills from the city account, which was soon exhausted.

The gold reserves of the Bank of France had been moved out of Paris for safety in August 1870, in addition to 88 million francs in gold coins and 166 million francs in banknotes. When the Thiers government left Paris in March, they did not have the time or the reliable soldiers to take the money with them. The reserves were guarded by 500 national guardsmen who were themselves Bank of France employees. Some Communards wanted to appropriate the bank's reserves to fund social projects, but Jourde resisted, explaining that without the gold reserves the currency would collapse and all the money of the Commune would be worthless. The Commune appointed Charles Beslay as the Commissioner of the Bank of France, and he arranged for the Bank to loan the Commune 400,000 francs a day. This was approved by Thiers, who felt that to negotiate a future peace treaty the Germans were demanding war reparations of five billion francs; the gold reserves would be needed to keep the franc stable and pay the indemnity. Jourde's actions were later condemned by Karl Marx and other Marxists, who felt the Commune should have confiscated the bank's reserves.

=== Press ===
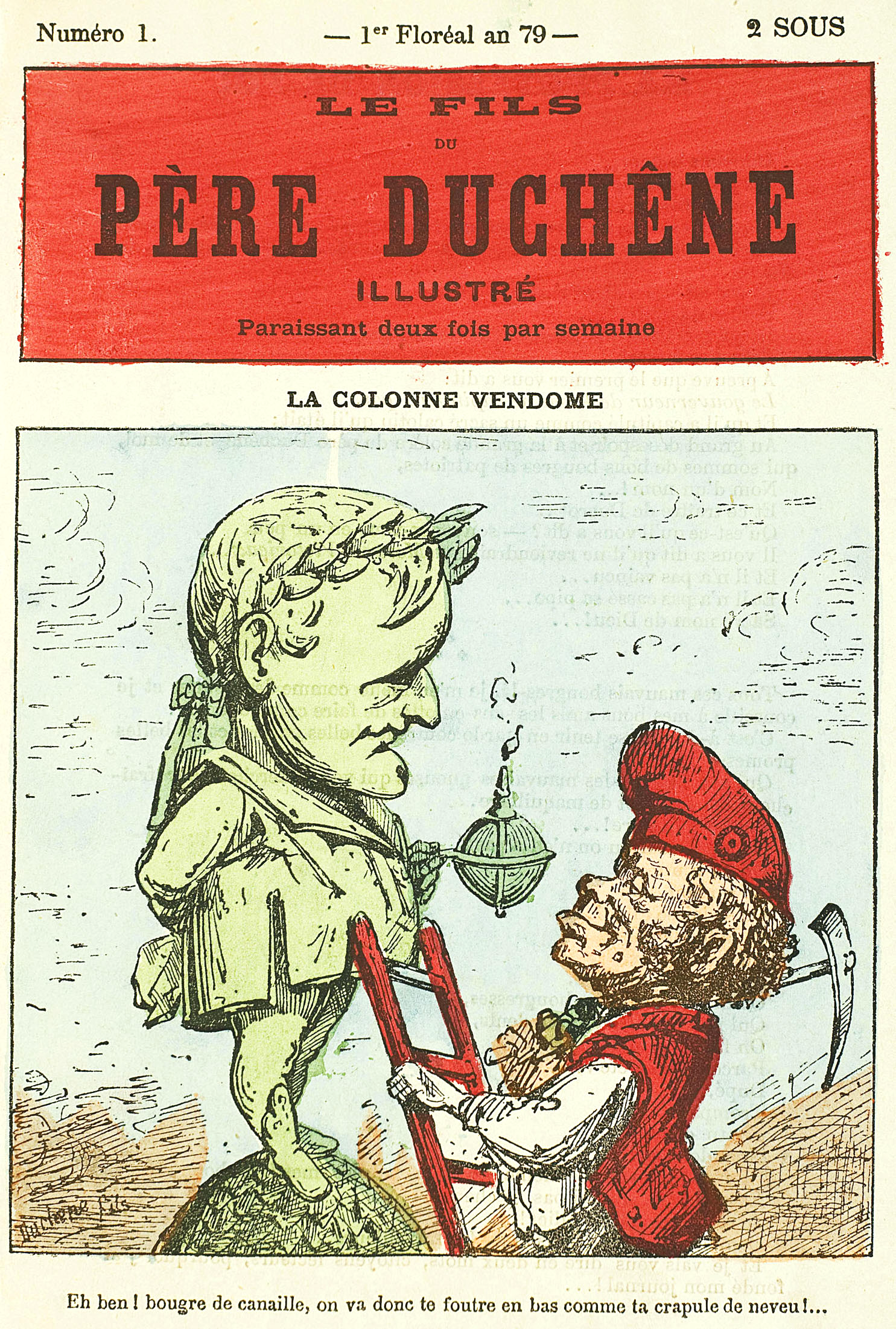
Le Père Duchêne looks at the statue of Napoleon on top of the Vendôme column, about to be torn down by the Communards.

From 21 March, the Central Committee of the National Guard banned the major pro-Versailles newspapers, Le Gaulois and Le Figaro. Their offices were invaded and closed by crowds of the Commune's supporters. After 18 April other newspapers sympathetic to Versailles were also closed. The Versailles government, in turn, imposed strict censorship and prohibited any publication in favour of the Commune.

At the same time, the number of pro-Commune newspapers and magazines published in Paris during the Commune expanded exponentially. The most popular of the pro-Commune newspapers was Le Cri du Peuple, published by Jules Vallès, which was published from 22 February until 23 May. Another highly popular publication was Le Père Duchêne, inspired by a similar paper of the same name published from 1790 until 1794; after its first issue on 6 March, it was briefly closed by General Vinoy, but it reappeared until 23 May. It specialised in humour, vulgarity and extreme abuse against the opponents of the Commune.

A republican press also flourished, including such papers as Le Mot d'Ordre of Henri Rochefort, which was both violently anti-Versailles and critical of the faults and excesses of the Commune. The most popular republican paper was Le Rappel, which condemned both Thiers and the killing of generals Lecomte and Clement-Thomas by the Communards. Its editor Auguste Vacquerie was close to Victor Hugo, whose son François-Victor Hugo wrote for the paper. The editors wrote,

"We are against the National Assembly, but we are not for the Commune. That which we defend, that which we love, that which we admire, is Paris."

=== Anti-clericalism ===
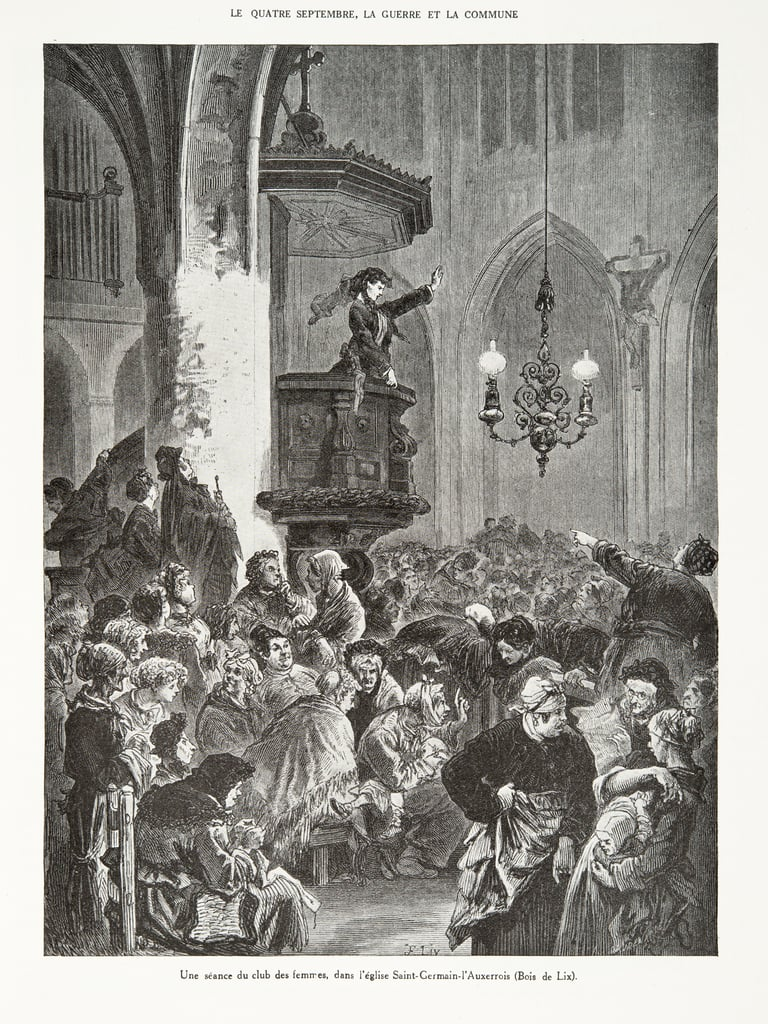
The Church of Saint-Germain l'Auxerrois was briefly turned into a Socialist women's club

From the beginning, the Commune had a hostile relationship with the Catholic Church. On 2 April, soon after the Commune was established, it voted a decree accusing the Catholic Church of "complicity in the crimes of the monarchy". The decree declared the separation of church and state, confiscated the state funds allotted to the Church, seized the property of religious congregations, and ordered that Catholic schools cease religious education and become secular.

Over the next seven weeks, some two hundred priests, nuns and monks were arrested, and twenty-six churches were closed to the public. At the urging of the more radical newspapers, National Guard units searched the basements of churches, looking for evidence of alleged sadism and criminal practices. More extreme elements of the National Guard carried out mock religious processions and parodies of religious services. Some churches, like Saint-Germain l'Auxerrois, were turned into socialist meeting clubs.

Early in May, some of the political clubs began to demand the immediate execution of Archbishop Darboy and the other priests in the prison. The Archbishop and a number of priests were executed during Bloody Week, in retaliation for the execution of Commune soldiers by the regular army.

=== Destruction of the Vendôme Column ===
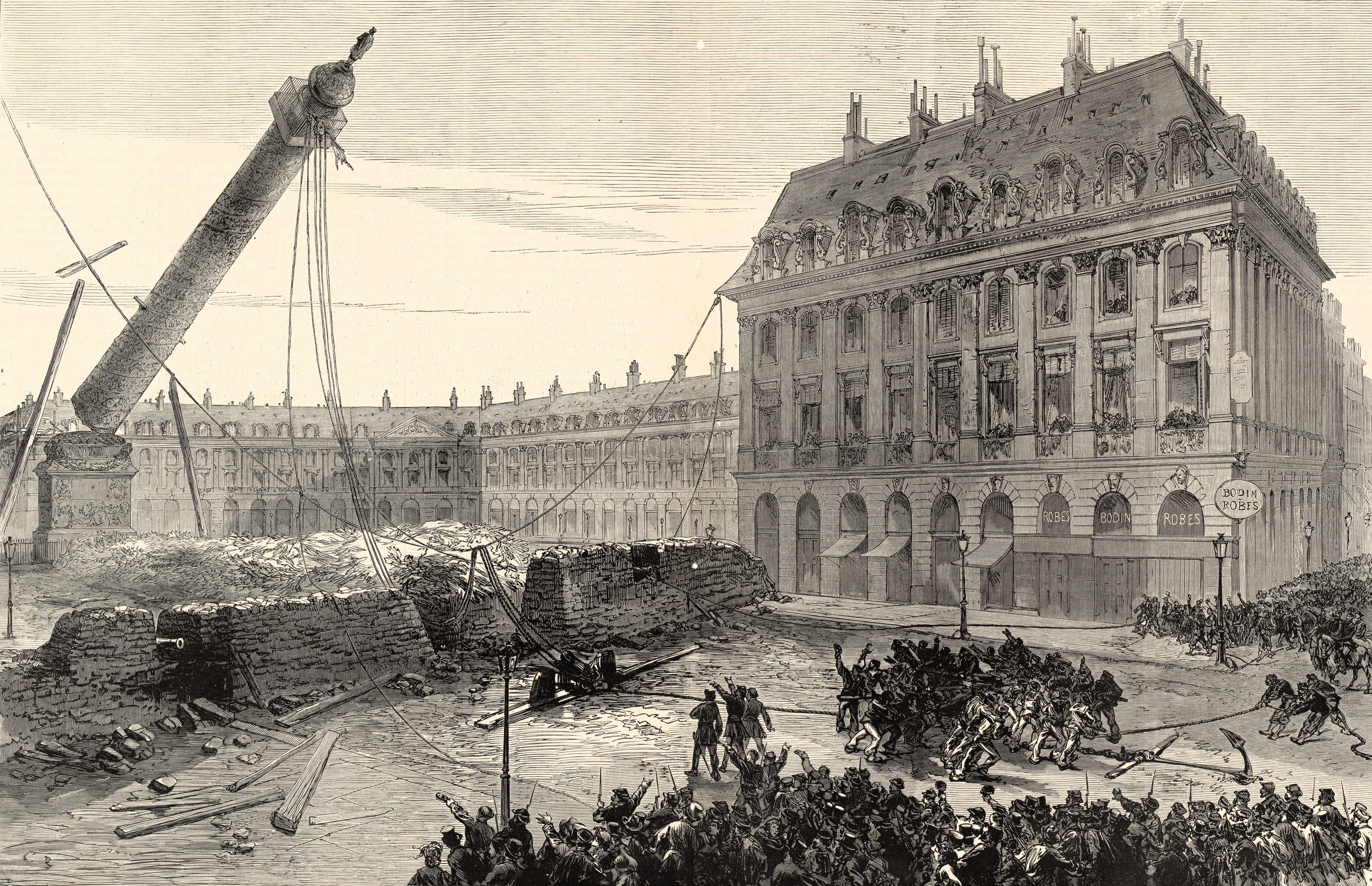
Toppling of the Vendôme Column on 16 May 1871. The column's destruction fulfilled an official proposition made the previous September by painter Gustave Courbet. After the end of the Commune, Courbet was sentenced to six months in prison and later ordered to pay for putting the column back up. He could never pay, and died soon afterward in exile

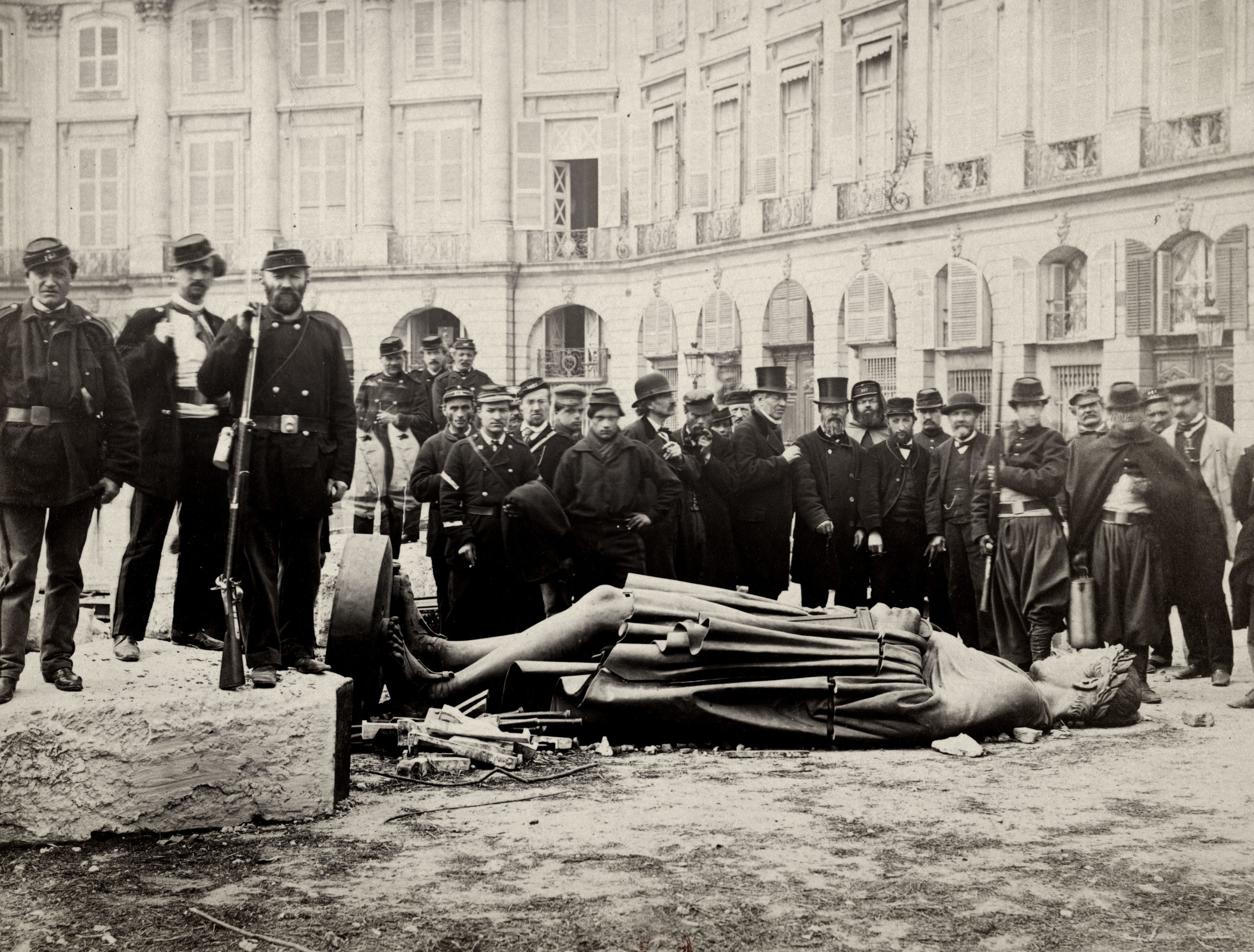
Statue on the ground of Emperor Napoleon I, considered the symbol of imperial despotism

The destruction of the Vendôme Column honouring the victories of Napoleon I, topped by a statue of the Emperor, was one of the most prominent civic events during the Commune. It was voted on 12 April by the executive committee of the Commune, which declared that the column was "a monument of barbarism" and a "symbol of brute force and false pride". The idea had originally come from the painter Gustave Courbet, who had written to the Government of National Defence on 4 September calling for the demolition of the column. In October, he had called for a new column, made of melted-down German cannons, "the column of peoples, the column of Germany and France, forever federated." Courbet was elected to the Council of the Commune on 16 April, after the decision to tear down the column had already been made. The ceremonial destruction took place on 16 May. In the presence of two battalions of the National Guard and the leaders of the Commune, a band played "La Marseillaise" and the "Chant du Départ". The first effort to pull down the column failed, but at 5:30 in the afternoon the column broke from its base and shattered into three pieces. The pedestal was draped with red flags, and pieces of the statue were taken to be melted down and made into coins.

On 12 May a crowd organised by the Commune destroyed the residence of Adolphe Thiers, the leader of the Third Republic, on Place Saint-Georges. Proposed by Henri Rochefort, editor of the Le Mot d'Ordre, on 6 April, it was not voted upon by the Commune until 10 May.

== War with the national government ==
=== Mobilization of both sides and attack by the government army ===
In Versailles, Thiers had estimated that he needed 150,000 men to recapture Paris, and that he had only about 20,000 reliable first-line soldiers, plus about 5,000 gendarmes. He worked rapidly to assemble a new and reliable regular army. Most of the soldiers were prisoners of war who had just been released by the Germans, following the terms of the armistice. Others were sent from military units in all of the provinces. To command the new army, Thiers chose Patrice de MacMahon, who had won fame fighting the Austrians in Italy under Napoleon III, and who had been seriously wounded at the Battle of Sedan. He was highly popular both within the army and in the country. By 30 March, less than two weeks after the Army's Montmartre rout, it began skirmishing with the National Guard on the outskirts of Paris.

The Versailles Army was the first to attack. On 21 March, it occupied the fort of Mont-Valérien where the Commune's fédérés had neglected to settle. This position, which dominated the entire near western suburbs of Paris, gave them a considerable advantage. On 30 March, General de Gallifet occupied the Courbevoie roundabout and on 2 April, the Versaillais seized Courbevoie and Puteaux, the fédérés retreating towards Neuilly.

=== Failure of the march on Versailles ===
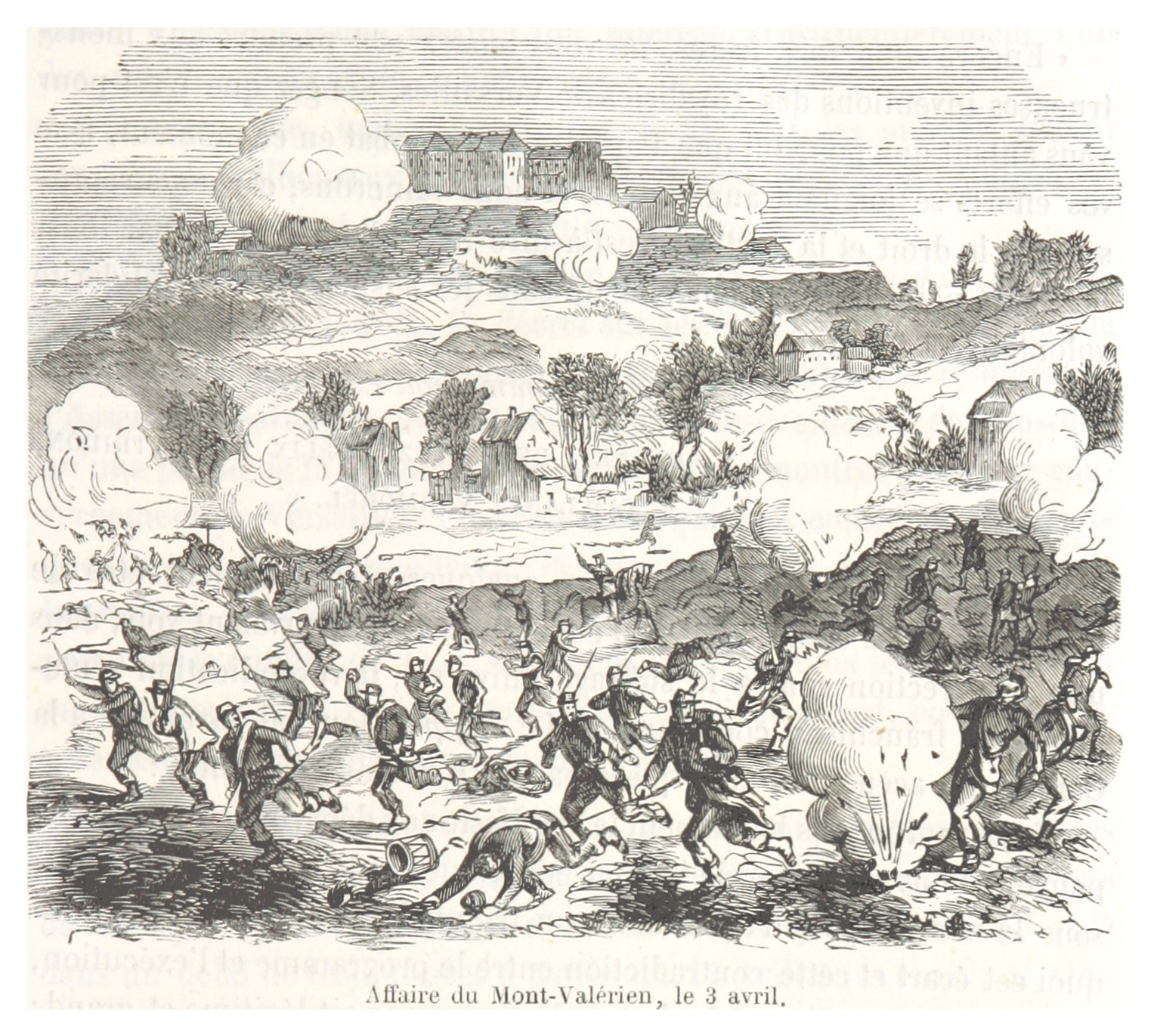
On 3 April, the Federates were pushed back to the Nanterre plain by artillery fire from the Fort Mont-Valérien

In Paris, members of the Military Commission and the executive committee of the Commune, as well as the Central Committee of the National Guard, met on 1 April. They decided to launch an offensive against the Army in Versailles within five days. The attack was first launched on the morning of 2 April by five battalions who crossed the Seine at the Pont de Neuilly. The National Guard troops were quickly repulsed by the Army, with a loss of about twelve soldiers. One officer of the Versailles army, a surgeon from the medical corps, was killed; the National Guardsmen had mistaken his uniform for that of a gendarme. Five national guardsmen were captured by the regulars; two were Army deserters and two were caught with their weapons in their hands. General Vinoy, the commander of the Paris Military District, had ordered any prisoners who were deserters from the Army to be shot. The commander of the regular forces, Colonel Georges Ernest Boulanger, went further and ordered that all four prisoners be summarily shot. The practice of shooting prisoners captured with weapons became common in the bitter fighting in the weeks ahead.

Despite this first failure, Commune leaders were still convinced that, as at Montmartre, French army soldiers would refuse to fire on national guardsmen. They prepared a massive offensive of 27,000 national guardsmen who would advance in three columns. They were expected to converge at the end of 24 hours at the gates of the Palace of Versailles. They advanced on the morning of 3 April—without cavalry to protect the flanks, without artillery, without stores of food and ammunition, and without ambulances—confident of rapid success. They passed by the line of forts outside the city, believing them to be occupied by national guardsmen. In fact the army had re-occupied the abandoned forts on 28 March. The National Guard soon came under heavy artillery and rifle fire; they broke ranks and fled back to Paris. Once again national guardsmen captured with weapons were routinely shot by army units.

=== Decree on Hostages ===
Commune leaders responded to the execution of prisoners by the Army by passing a new order on 5 April—the Decree on Hostages, which will only be implemented when the insurrection is crushed (Bloody Week). Under the decree, any person accused of complicity with the Versailles government could be immediately arrested, imprisoned and tried by a special jury of accusation. Those convicted by the jury would become "hostages of the people of Paris". Article 5 stated,

"Every execution of a prisoner of war or of a partisan of the government of the Commune of Paris will be immediately followed by the execution of a triple number of hostages held by virtue of article four."

Prisoners of war would be brought before a jury, which would decide if they would be released or held as hostages. The National Assembly in Versailles responded to the decree the next day; it passed a law allowing military tribunals to judge and punish suspects within 24 hours. Émile Zola wrote,

"Thus we citizens of Paris are placed between two terrible laws; the law of suspects brought back by the Commune and the law on rapid executions which will certainly be approved by the Assembly. They are not fighting with cannon shots, they are slaughtering each other with decrees."

About one hundred hostages, including the Archbishop, were shot by the Commune before its end.

=== Radicalisation ===
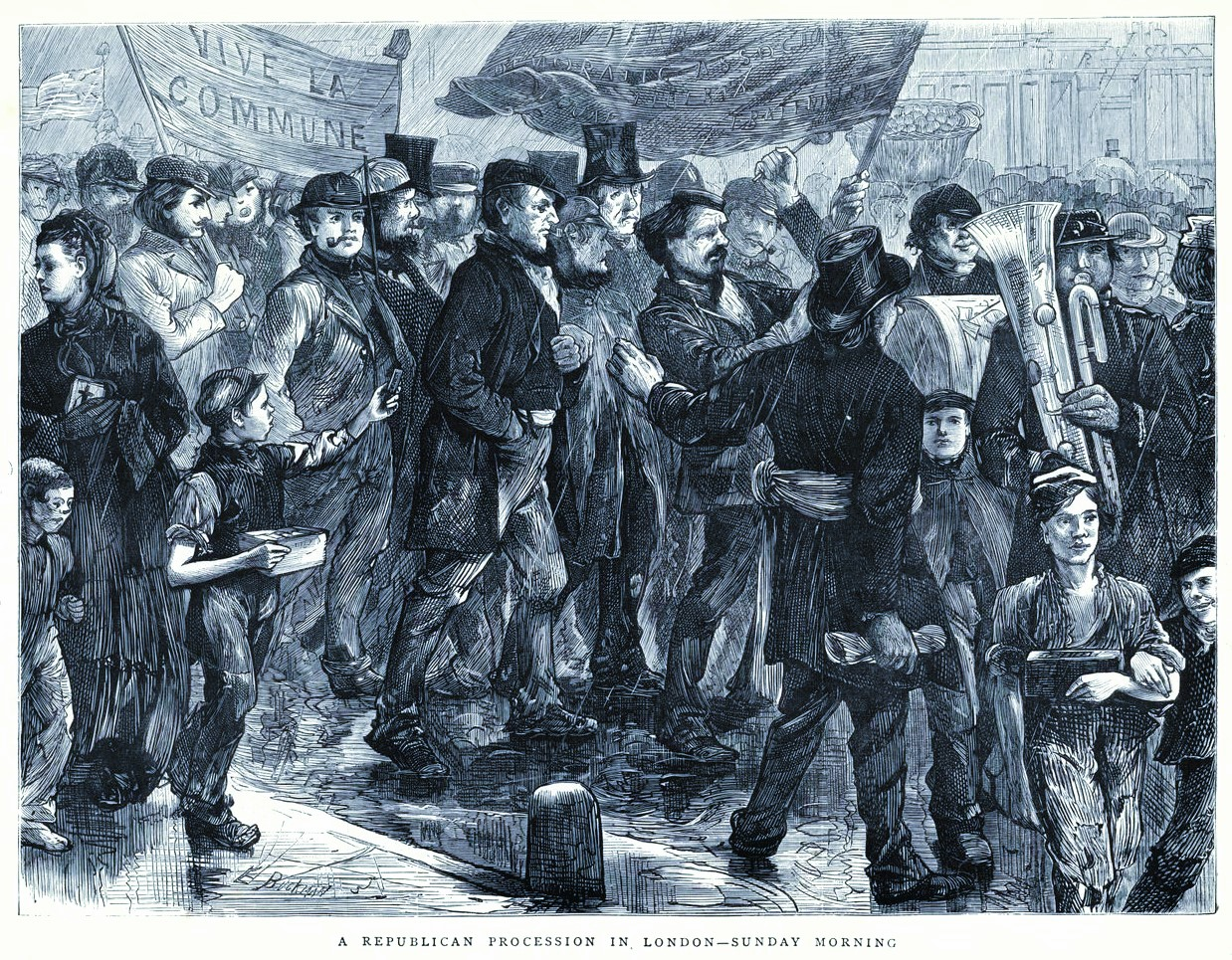
Demonstration of seven thousand London workers on Sunday, 16 April 1871, between Clerkenwell Green and Hyde Park, in support of the Paris Commune

By April, as MacMahon's forces steadily approached Paris, divisions arose within the Commune about whether to give absolute priority to military defence, or to political and social freedoms and reforms. The majority, including the Blanquists and the more radical revolutionaries, supported by Le Vengeur of Pyat and Le Père Duchesne of Vermersch, supported giving the military priority. The publications La Commune, La Justice and Valles' Le Cri du Peuple feared that a more authoritarian government would destroy the kind of social republic they wanted to achieve. Soon, the Council of the Commune voted, with strong opposition, for the creation of a Committee of Public Safety, modelled on and named after the committee that carried out the Reign of Terror (1793–94). Because of the implications carried by its name, many members of the Commune opposed the Committee of Public Safety's creation.

The committee was given extensive powers to hunt down and imprison enemies of the Commune. Led by Raoul Rigault, it began to make several arrests, usually on suspicion of treason, intelligence with the enemy, or insults to the Commune. Those arrested included General Edmond-Charles de Martimprey, the governor of Les Invalides, alleged to have caused the assassination of revolutionaries in December 1851, as well as more recent commanders of the National Guard, including Gustave Cluseret. High religious officials had been arrested: Archbishop Darboy, the Vicar General Abbé Lagarde, and the Curé of the Madeleine Abbé Deguerry. The policy of holding hostages for possible reprisals was denounced by some defenders of the Commune, including Victor Hugo, in a poem entitled "No Reprisals" published in Brussels on 21 April. On 12 April, Rigault proposed to exchange Archbishop Darboy and several other priests for the imprisoned Blanqui. Thiers refused the proposal, arguing that it would encourage more hostage-taking. On 14 May, Rigault proposed to exchange 70 hostages for the extreme-left leader, and Thiers again refused.

=== Composition of the National Guard ===
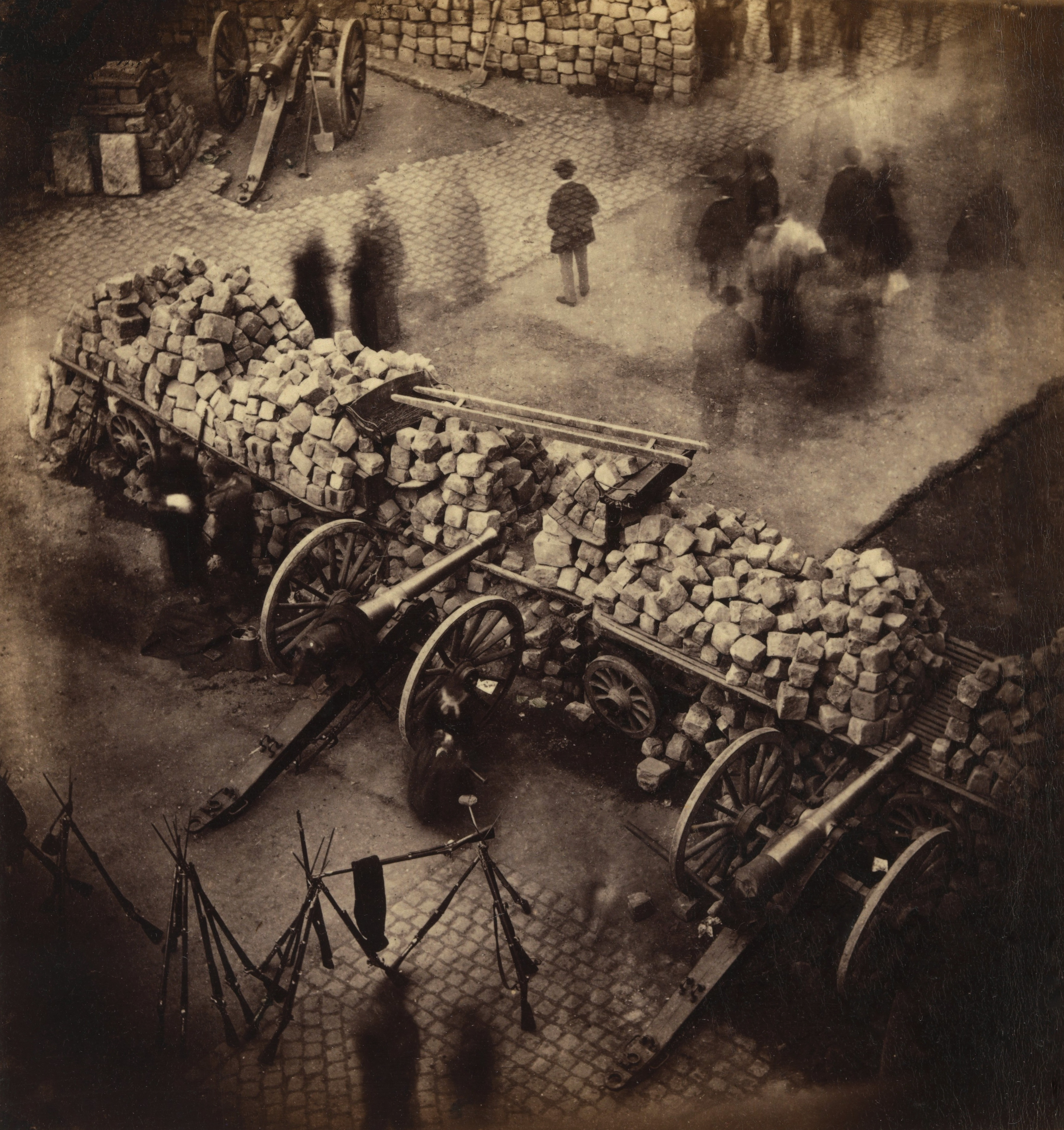
A barricade constructed by the Commune in April 1871 on the Rue de Rivoli near the Hotel de Ville. The figures are blurred due to the camera's lengthy exposure time, an effect commonly seen in early photographs.

Since every able-bodied man in Paris was obliged to be a member of the National Guard, the Commune on paper had an army of about 200,000 men on 6 May; the actual number was much lower, probably between 25,000 and 50,000 men. At the beginning of May, 20 percent of the National Guard was reported absent without leave.

By the end of the Commune, 43,522 prisoners were captured, 7,000 to 8,000 Communards had gone into exile abroad, and an estimated 10 to 15,000 Communards were killed, giving a total Commune force of about 65,000 men.

The National Guard had hundreds of cannons and thousands of rifles in its arsenal, but only half of the cannons and two-thirds of the rifles were ever used. There were heavy naval cannons mounted on the ramparts of Paris, but few national guardsmen were trained to use them. Between the end of April and 20 May, the number of trained artillerymen fell from 5,445 to 2,340.

The officers of the National Guard were elected by the soldiers, and their leadership qualities and military skills varied widely. Gustave Cluseret, the commander of the National Guard until his dismissal on 1 May, had tried to impose more discipline in the force, disbanding many unreliable units and making soldiers live in barracks instead of at home. He recruited officers with military experience, particularly Poles who had fled to France in 1863, after the Russians quelled the January Uprising; they played a prominent role in the last days of the Commune. One of these officers was General Jarosław Dąbrowski (Jaroslav Dombrowski in French), a Polish noble and a former Imperial Russian Army officer, who was appointed commander of the Commune forces on the right bank of the Seine. On 5 May, he was appointed commander of the Commune's whole army. Dąbrowski held this position until 23 May, when he was killed while defending the city barricades.

=== Capture of Fort Issy ===
One of the key strategic points around Paris was Fort d'Issy, south of the city near the Porte de Versailles, which blocked the route of the Army into Paris. The fort's garrison was commanded by Leon Megy, a former mechanic and a militant Blanquist, who had been sentenced to 20 years of hard labour for killing a policeman. After being freed he had led the takeover of the prefecture of Marseille by militant revolutionaries. When he came back to Paris, he was given the rank of colonel by the Central Committee of the National Guard, and the command of Fort d'Issy on 13 April.

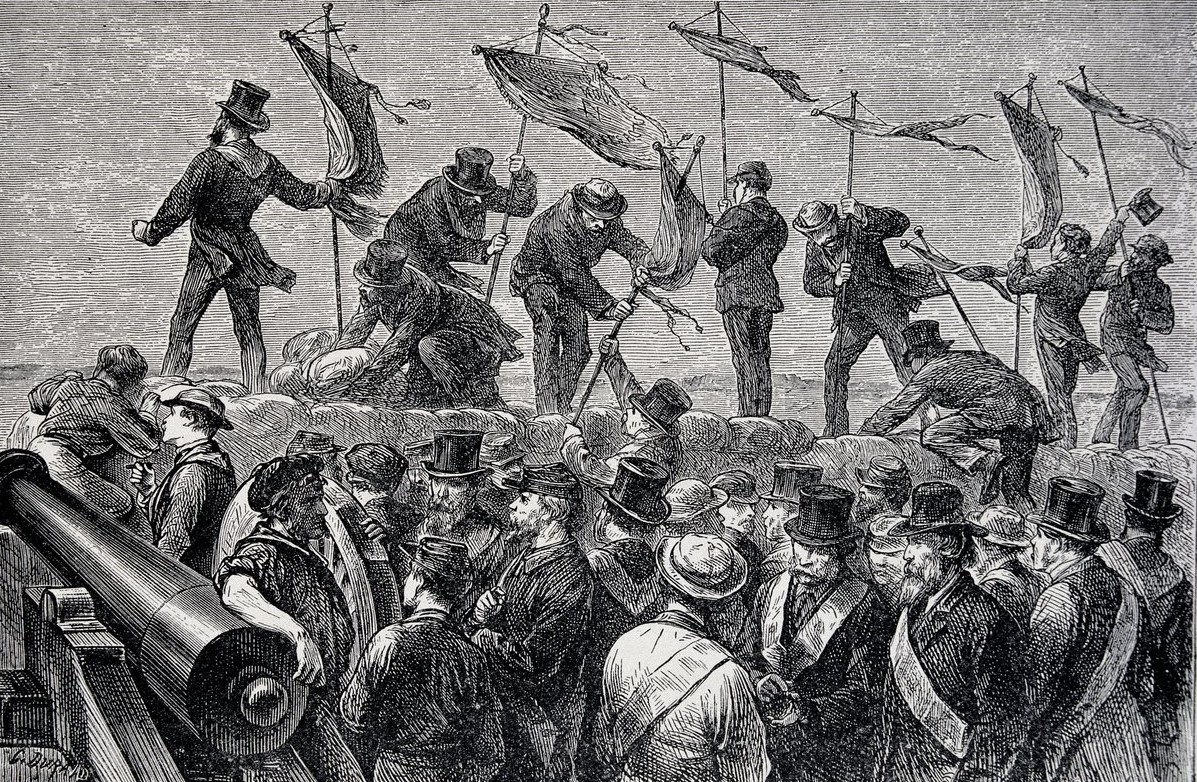
On 29 April 1871, the Freemasons demonstrated peacefully and planted their banners on the fortifications at Porte Maillot, in order to ask the Versailles troops to stop the bombardments and to negotiate

The army commander, General Ernest Courtot de Cissey, began a systematic siege and a heavy bombardment of the fort that lasted three days and three nights. At the same time Cissey sent a message to Colonel Megy, with the permission of Marshal MacMahon, offering to spare the lives of the fort's defenders, and let them return to Paris with their belongings and weapons, if they surrendered the fort. Colonel Megy gave the order, and during the night of 29–30 April, most of the soldiers evacuated the fort and returned to Paris, but news of the evacuation reached the Central Committee of the National Guard and the Commune. Before General Cissey and the Versailles army could occupy the fort, the National Guard rushed reinforcements there and re-occupied all the positions. General Cluseret, commander of the National Guard, was dismissed and put in prison. General Cissey resumed the intense bombardment of the fort. The defenders resisted until the night of 7–8 May, when the remaining national guardsmen in the fort, unable to withstand further attacks, decided to withdraw. The new commander of the National Guard, Louis Rossel, issued a terse bulletin: "The tricolor flag flies over the fort of Issy, abandoned yesterday by the garrison." The abandonment of the fort led the Commune to dismiss Rossel, and replace him with Delescluze, a fervent Communard but a journalist with no military experience.

Bitter fighting followed, as MacMahon's army worked its way systematically forward to the walls of Paris. On 20 May, MacMahon's artillery batteries at Montretout, Mont-Valérien, Boulogne, Issy, and Vanves opened fire on the western neighbourhoods of the city—Auteuil, Passy, and Trocadéro—with shells falling close to l'Étoile. Dąbrowski reported that the soldiers he had sent to defend the ramparts of the city between Point du Jour and Porte d'Auteuil had retreated to the city and that he had only 4,000 soldiers left at la Muette, 2,000 at Neuilly, and 200 at Asnières and Saint Ouen. "I lack artillerymen and workers to hold off the catastrophe." On 19 May, while the Commune executive committee was meeting to judge the former military commander Cluseret for the loss of the Issy fortress, it received word that the forces of Marshal MacMahon were within the fortifications of Paris.

== "Bloody Week" ==
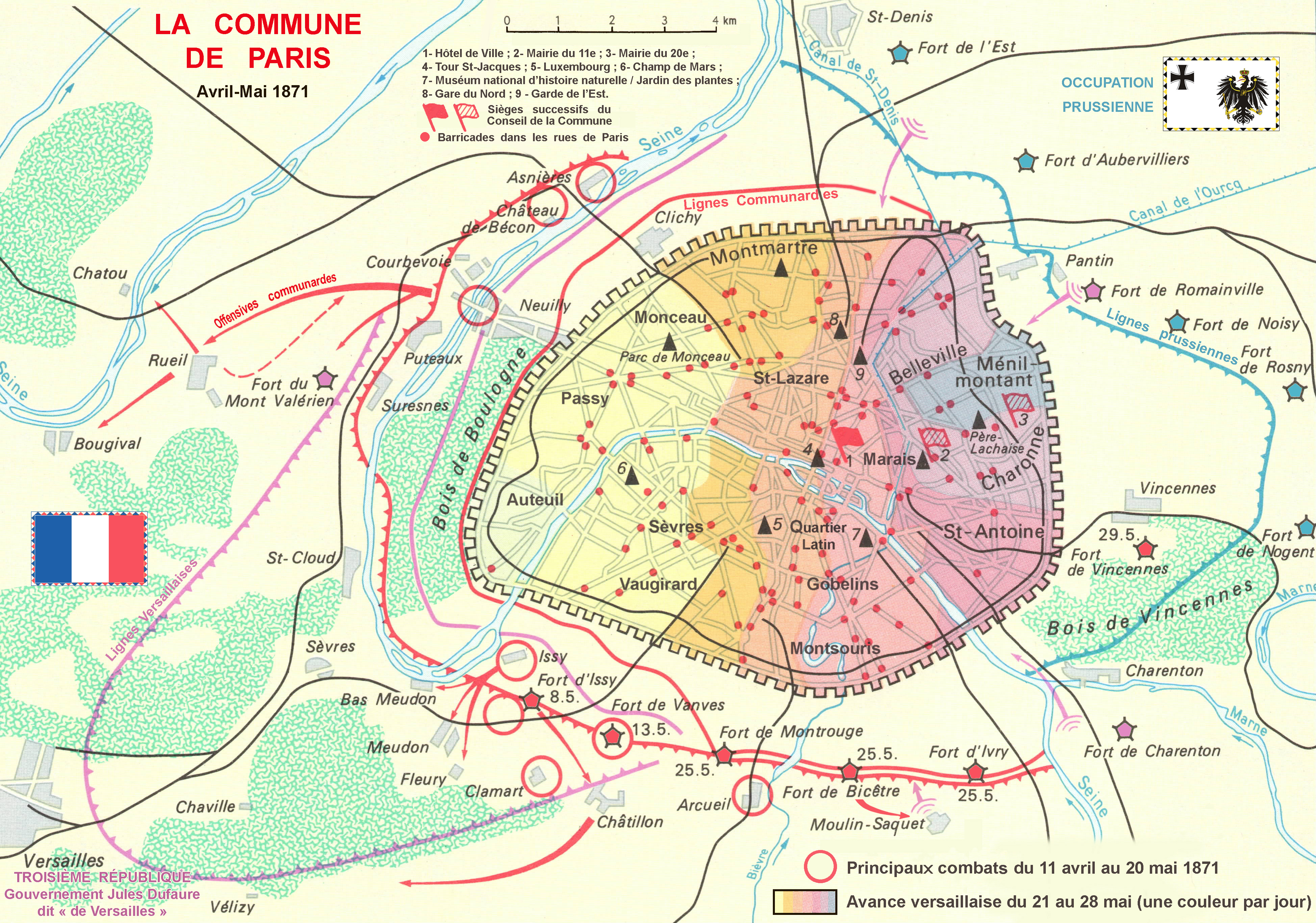
Map of Paris Commune and the ″bloody week″, drawn according with Michèle Audin, (fr) La Semaine sanglante, mai 1871, légendes et comptes, Libertalia publ., Montreuil 2021, ISBN 978-2-37729-176-2.

=== 21 May: Army enters Paris ===
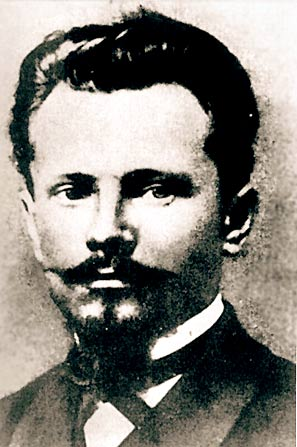
Jaroslav Dombrowski, a Polish exile and former military officer, was one of the few capable commanders of the National Guard. He was killed early in the Bloody Week.

The final offensive on Paris by MacMahon's army began on Sunday, 21 May. On the front line in the southwest, soldiers camped just outside the city learned from an agent inside the walls that the National Guard had withdrawn from one section of the city wall at Point-du-Jour, and that the fortifications were undefended. An army engineer crossed the moat and inspected the empty fortifications, and immediately telegraphed the news to Marshal MacMahon, who was with Thiers at Fort Mont-Valérien. MacMahon promptly gave orders, and two battalions passed through the fortifications without meeting resistance. The Versailles forces were able to swiftly capture the city gates of the Porte de Saint-Cloud, La Muette and the Porte de Versailles from inside. By four o'clock in the morning, fifty thousand soldiers had passed into the city, and advanced as far as the Champs-Élysées.

When he received the news from Dombrowski that the army was inside Paris, the Commune leader Delescluze refused to believe it, and refused to ring the bells to warn the city until the following morning. The trial of Gustave Cluseret, the former commander, was still going on at the Commune when they received the message from General Dombrowski that the army was inside the city. He asked for reinforcements and proposed an immediate counterattack. "Remain calm," he wrote, "and everything will be saved. We must not be defeated!". When they had received this news, the members of the Commune executive returned to their deliberations on the fate of Cluseret, which continued until eight o'clock that evening.

The first reaction of many of the National Guard was to find someone to blame, and Dombrowski was the first to be accused. Rumours circulated that he had accepted a million francs to give up the city. He was deeply offended by the rumours. They stopped when Dombrowski died two days later from wounds received on the barricades. His last reported words were: "Do they still say I was a traitor?"

=== 22 May: Barricades, first street battles ===
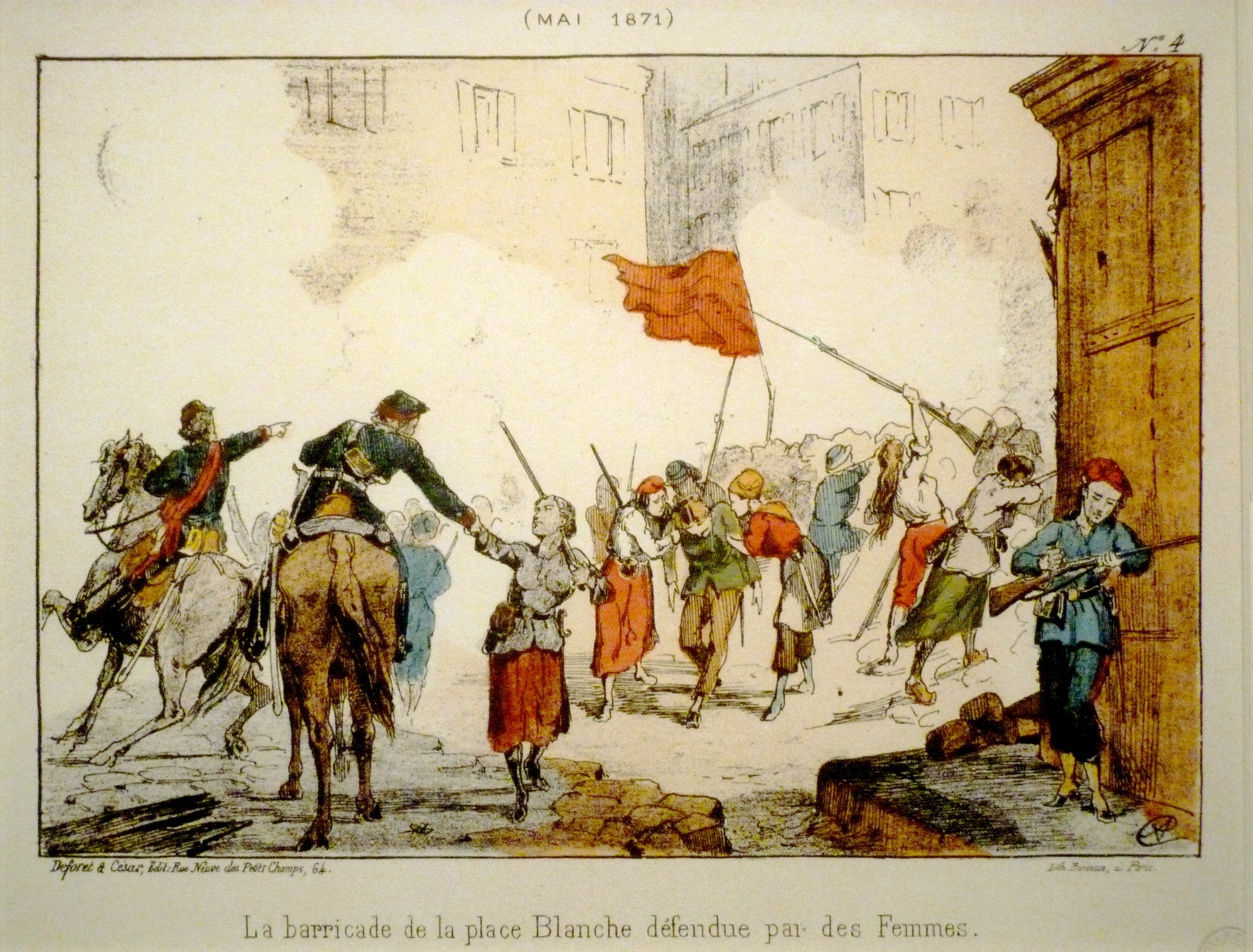
A barricade on Place Blanche during Bloody Week, whose defenders included Louise Michel and a unit of 30 women

On the morning of 22 May, bells finally were rung around the city, and Delescluze, as delegate for war of the Commune, issued a proclamation, posted all over Paris:

In the name of this glorious France, mother of all the popular revolutions, permanent home of the ideas of justice and solidarity which should be and will be the laws of the world, march at the enemy, and may your revolutionary energy show him that someone can sell Paris, but no one can give it up, or conquer it! The Commune counts on you, count on the Commune!

The Committee of Public Safety issued its own decree:

TO ARMS! That Paris be bristling with barricades, and that, behind these improvised ramparts, it will hurl again its cry of war, its cry of pride, its cry of defiance, but its cry of victory; because Paris, with its barricades, is undefeatable ...That revolutionary Paris, that Paris of great days, does its duty; the Commune and the Committee of Public Safety will do theirs!

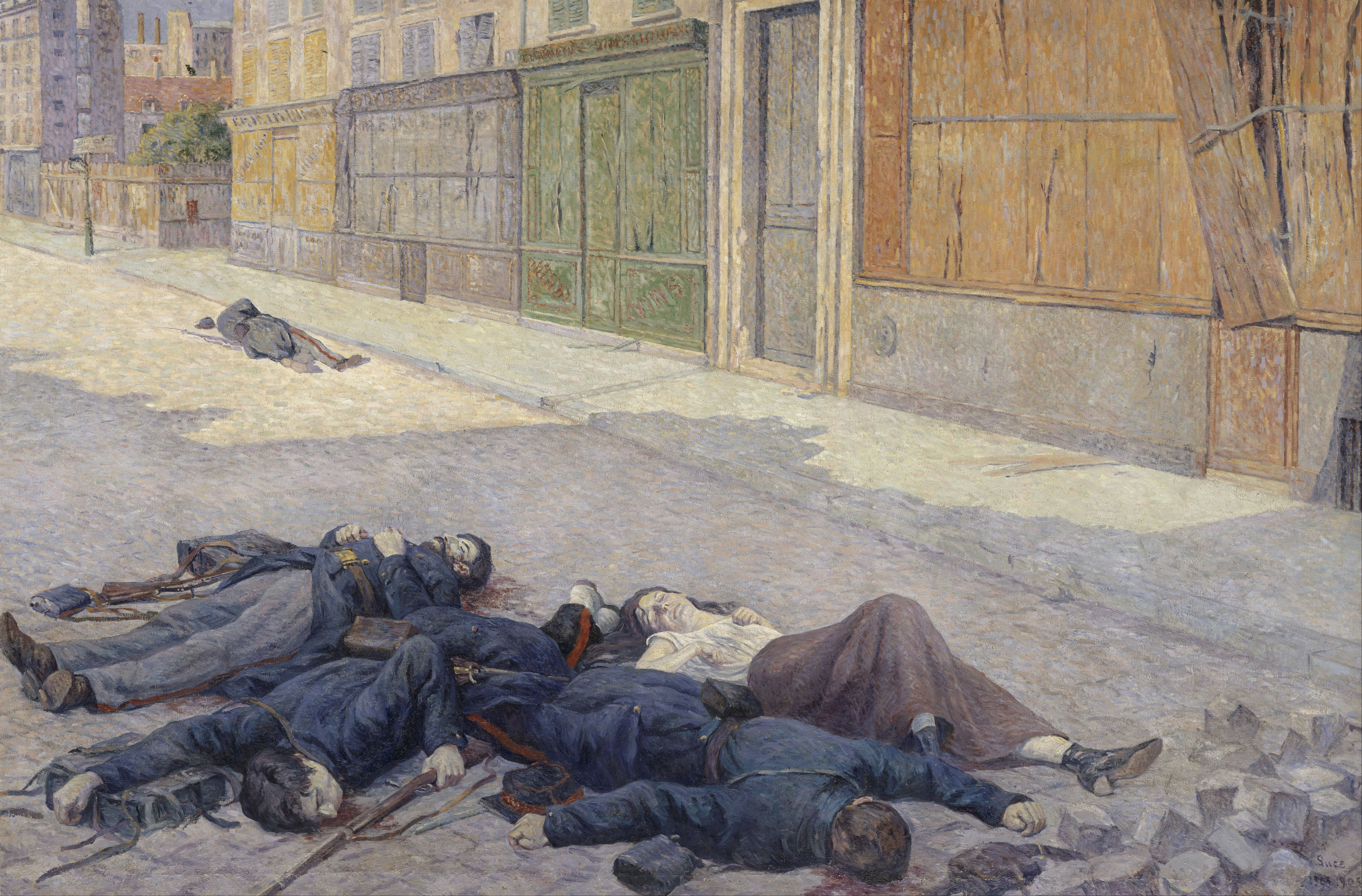
A street in Paris in May 1871, by Maximilien Luce

Despite the appeals, only fifteen to twenty thousand persons, including many women and children, responded. The forces of the Commune were outnumbered five-to-one by the army of Marshal MacMahon.

Once the fighting began inside Paris, the strong neighborhood loyalties that had been an advantage of the Commune became something of a disadvantage: instead of an overall planned defence, each "quartier" fought desperately for its survival, and each was overcome in turn. The webs of narrow streets that made entire districts nearly impregnable in earlier Parisian revolutions had in the centre been replaced by wide boulevards during Haussmann's renovation of Paris. The Versailles forces enjoyed a centralised command and had superior numbers. Equally important, they had learned the tactics of street fighting from 1848 and earlier uprisings. They avoided making frontal attacks on Commune barricades. They tunnelled through walls of neighbouring houses to establish positions above the barricades, and gradually worked their way around and behind them, usually forcing the Communards to withdraw without a fight. The majority of the barricades in Paris were abandoned without combat. On the morning of 22 May, the regular army occupied a large area from the Porte Dauphine; to the Champ de Mars and the École Militaire, where General Cissey established his headquarters; to the Porte de Vanves. In a short time the army's 5th Corps advanced toward Parc Monceau and Place Clichy, while General Félix Douay occupied the Place de l'Étoile and General Clichant occupied the Gare Saint-Lazare. Little resistance was encountered in the west of Paris, but the army moved forward slowly and cautiously, in no hurry.

No one had expected the army to enter the city, so only a few large barricades were already in place, on the rue Saint-Florentin and Avenue de l'Opéra, and the rue de Rivoli. Barricades had not been prepared in advance; some nine hundred barricades were built hurriedly out of paving stones and sacks of earth. Many other people prepared shelters in the cellars. The first serious fighting took place on the afternoon of the 22nd: an artillery duel between regular army batteries on the Quai d'Orsay and the Madeleine, and National Guard batteries on the terrace of the Tuileries Palace. On the same day, the first executions of National Guard soldiers by the regular army inside Paris took place; some sixteen prisoners captured on the rue du Bac were given a summary hearing, and then shot.

=== 23 May: Battle for Montmartre; burning of Tuileries Palace ===
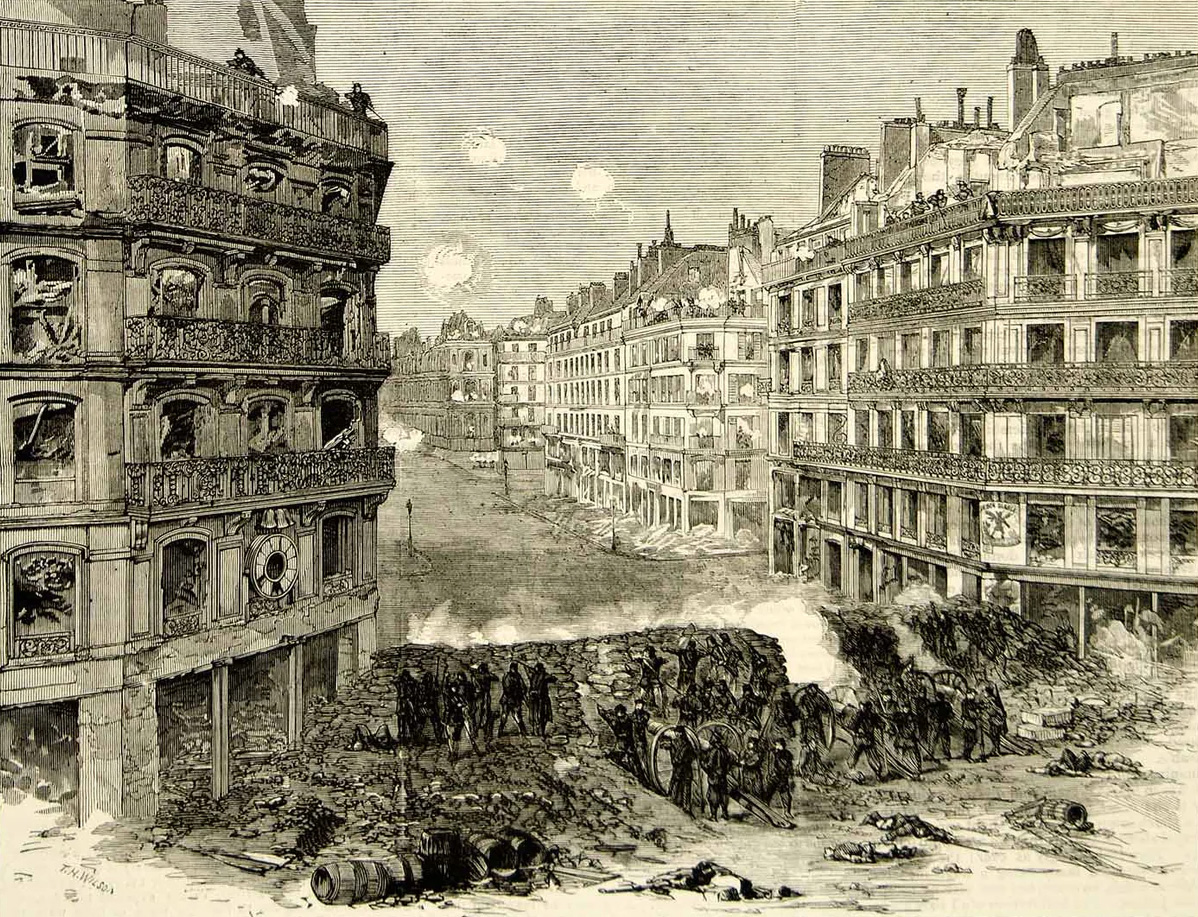
Communards defending a barricade on the rue de Rivoli

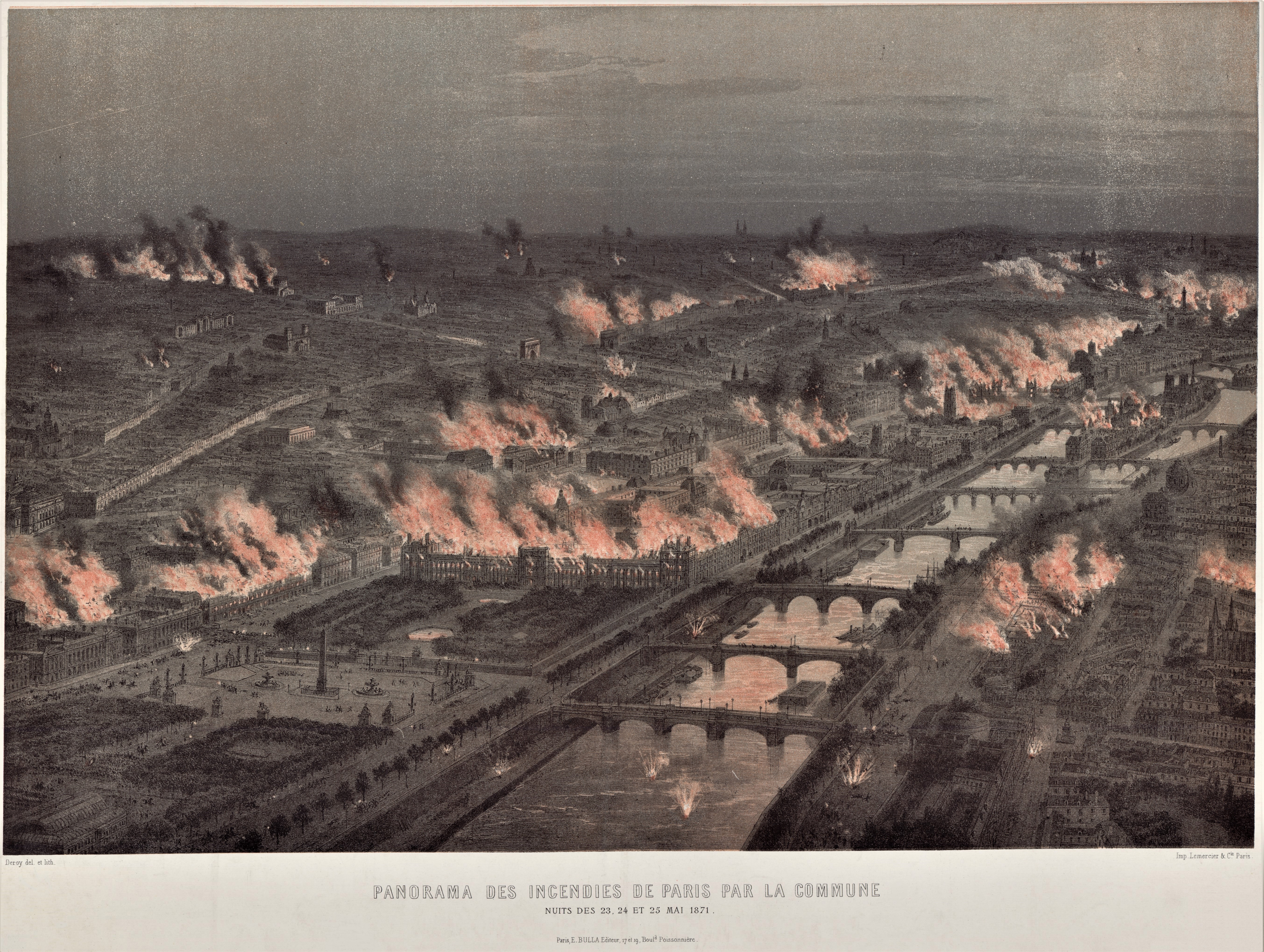
Fires lit by the Commune during the night of 23–24 May

On 23 May the next objective of the army was the butte Montmartre, where the uprising had begun. The National Guard had built and manned a circle of barricades and makeshift forts around the base of the butte. The eighty-five cannon and twenty rapid-firing guns captured from the army at the beginning of the Commune were still there, but no one had expected an attack and they had no ammunition, powder cartridges or trained gunners.

The garrison of one barricade, at Chaussee Clignancourt, included a battalion of about thirty women, including Louise Michel. She was seized by regular soldiers and thrown into the trench in front of the barricade and left for dead. She escaped and soon afterwards surrendered to the army, to prevent the arrest of her mother. The battalions of the National Guard were no match for the army; by midday on the 23rd the regular soldiers were at the top of Montmartre, and the tricolor flag was raised over the Solferino tower. The soldiers captured 42 guardsmen and several women, took them to the same house on rue des Rosier where generals Clement-Thomas and Lecomte had been executed, and shot them. On the rue Royale, soldiers seized the formidable barricade around the Madeleine church; 300 prisoners captured with their weapons were shot there, the largest of the mass executions of the rebels.

On the same day, having had little success fighting the army, units of national guardsmen began to take revenge by burning public buildings symbolising the government. The guardsmen led by Paul Brunel, one of the original leaders of the Commune, took cans of oil and set fire to buildings near the rue Royale and the rue du Faubourg Saint-Honoré. Following the example set by Brunel, guardsmen set fire to dozens of other buildings on rue Saint-Florentin, rue de Rivoli, rue du Bac, rue de Lille, and other streets.

The Tuileries Palace, which had been the residence of most of the monarchs of France from Henry IV to Napoleon III, was defended by a garrison of some three hundred National Guard with thirty cannon placed in the garden. They had been engaged in a day-long artillery duel with the regular army. At about seven in the evening, the commander of the garrison, Jules Bergeret, gave the order to burn the palace. The walls, floors, curtains and woodwork were soaked with oil and turpentine, and barrels of gunpowder were placed at the foot of the grand staircase and in the courtyard, then the fires were set. The fire lasted 48 hours and gutted the palace, except for the southernmost part, the Pavillon de Flore. Bergeret sent a message to the Hotel de Ville:

"The last vestiges of royalty have just disappeared. I wish that the same will happen to all the monuments of Paris."

The Richelieu library of the Louvre, connected to the Tuileries, was also set on fire and entirely destroyed. The rest of the Louvre was saved by the efforts of the museum curators and fire brigades. The consensus of later historians is that most of the major fires were started by the National Guard and several organised Communard groups; but that few if any fires were started by women. In addition to public buildings, the National Guard also started fires at the homes of a number of residents associated with the regime of Napoleon III, including that of historian and playwright Prosper Mérimée, author of Carmen.

=== 24 May: Burning of Hotel de Ville; executions of Communards, the archbishop and hostages ===
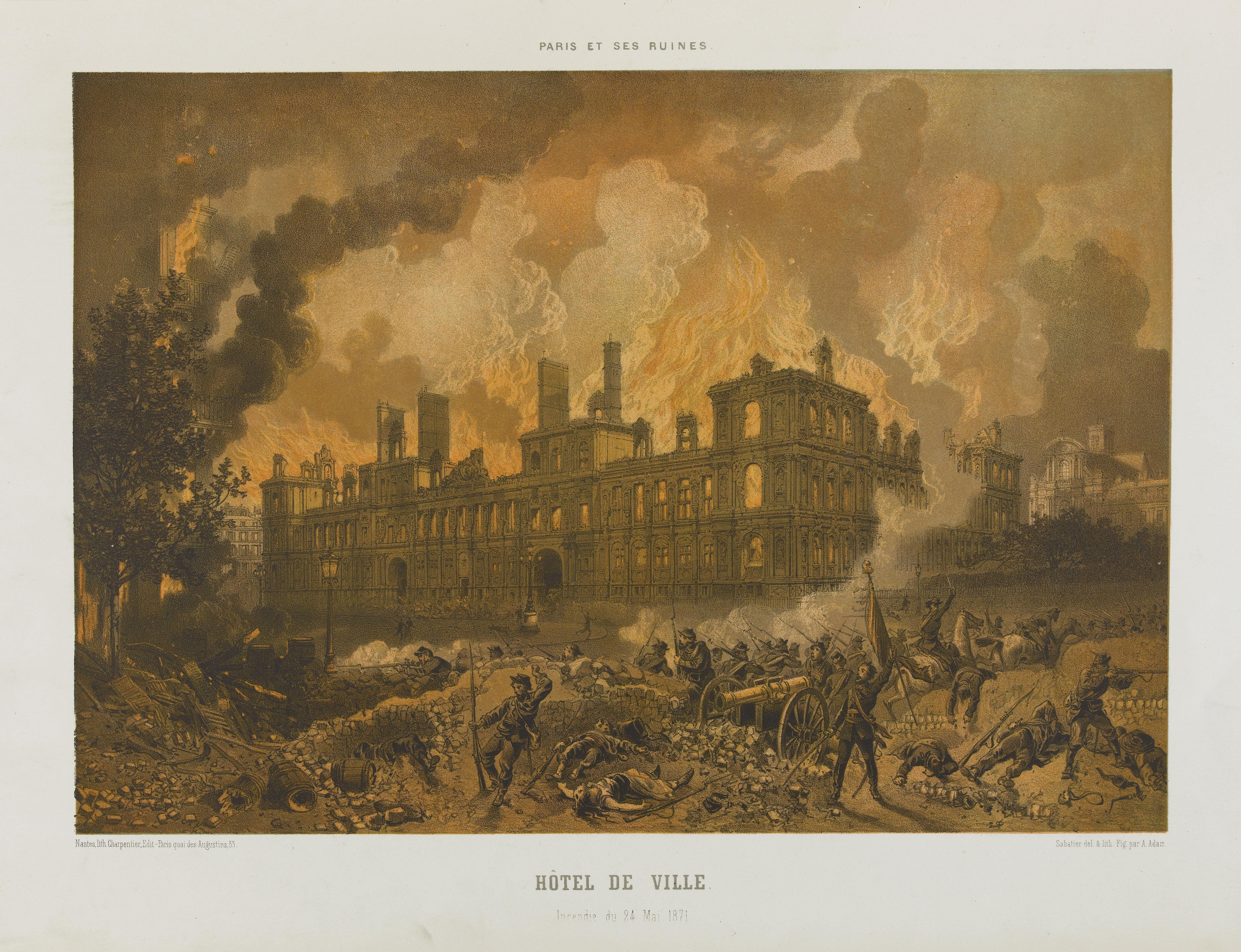
Fire at The Hôtel de Ville, the headquarters of the Commune, attacked by the Versailles Army and burned by the National Guard

At two in the morning on 24 May, Brunel and his men went to the Hôtel de Ville, which was still the headquarters of the Commune and of its chief executive, Delescluze. Wounded men were being tended in the halls, and some of the National Guard officers and Commune members were changing from their uniforms into civilian clothes and shaving their beards, preparing to escape from the city. Delescluze ordered everyone to leave the building, and Brunel's men set it on fire.

The battles resumed at daylight on 24 May, under a sky black with smoke from the burning palaces and ministries. There was no co-ordination or central direction on the Commune side; each neighborhood fought on its own. The National Guard disintegrated, with many soldiers changing into civilian clothes and fleeing the city, leaving between 10,000 and 15,000 Communards to defend the barricades. Delescluze moved his headquarters from the Hôtel de Ville to the city hall of the 11th arrondissement, and set fire to the Hotel de Ville. More public buildings were set afire, including the Palais de Justice, the Prefecture de Police, the theatres of Châtelet and Porte-Saint-Martin, and the Church of Saint-Eustache. Most of the Palais de Justice was destroyed, but the Sainte-Chapelle survived. Fires set at the Louvre Palace, Palais-Royal and Notre-Dame were extinguished without causing significant damage.

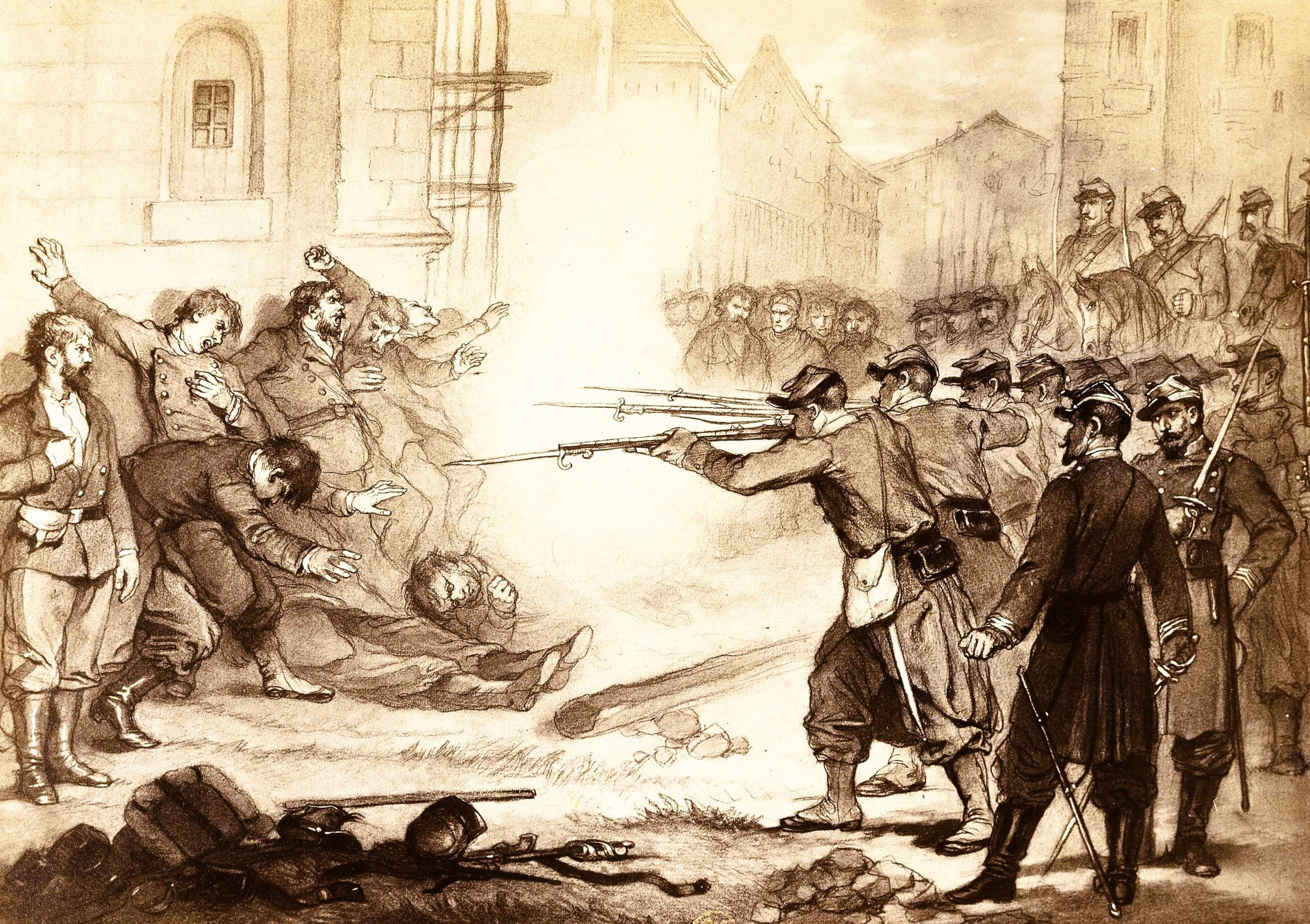
Execution of Communards by Versailles troops

As the army continued its methodical advance, the summary executions of captured Communard soldiers by the army continued. Informal military courts were established at the École Polytechnique, Châtelet, the Luxembourg Palace, Parc Monceau, and other locations around Paris. The hands of captured prisoners were examined to see if they had fired weapons. The prisoners gave their identity, sentence was pronounced by a court of two or three gendarme officers, the prisoners were taken out and sentences immediately carried out.

Amid the news of the growing number of executions carried out by the army in different parts of the city, the Communards carried out their own executions as an unsuccessful attempt at retaliation. Raoul Rigaut, the chairman of the Committee of Public Safety, without getting the authorisation of the Commune, executed one group of four prisoners, before he himself was captured and shot by an army patrol. On 24 May, a delegation of national guardsmen and Gustave Genton, a member of the Committee of Public Safety, came to the new headquarters of the Commune at the city hall of the 11th arrondissement and demanded the immediate execution of the hostages held at the prison of La Roquette. The new prosecutor of the Commune, Théophile Ferré, hesitated and then wrote a note: "Order to the Citizen Director of La Roquette to execute six hostages." Genton asked for volunteers to serve as a firing squad, and went to the La Roquette prison, where many of the hostages were being held. Genton was given a list of hostages and selected six names, including Georges Darboy, the Archbishop of Paris, and three priests. The governor of the prison, M. François, refused to give up the Archbishop without a specific order from the Commune. Genton sent a deputy back to the Prosecutor, who wrote "and especially the archbishop" on the bottom of his note. Archbishop Darboy and five other hostages were promptly taken out into the courtyard of the prison, lined up against the wall, and shot.

=== 25 May: Death of Delescluze ===
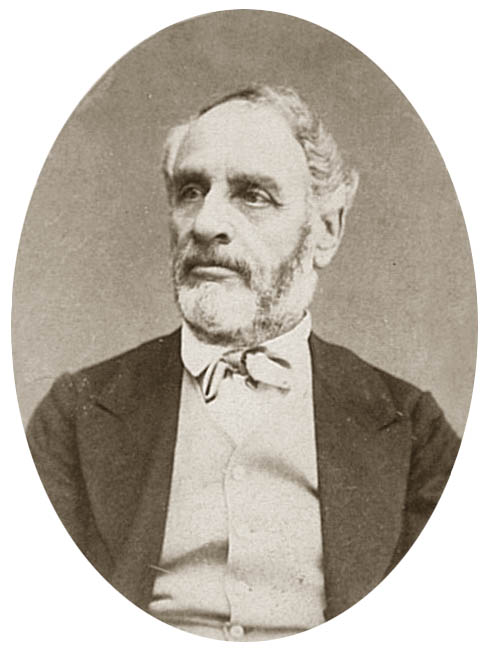
Louis Charles Delescluze, last military leader of the Commune, was shot dead after he stood atop a barricade, unarmed.

By the end of 24 May, the regular army had cleared most of the Latin Quarter barricades, and held three-fifths of Paris. MacMahon had his headquarters at the Quai d'Orsay. The insurgents held only the 11th, 12th, 19th and 20th arrondissements, and parts of the 3rd, 5th, and 13th. Delescluze and the remaining leaders of the Commune, about 20 in all, were at the city hall of the 13th arrondissement on Place Voltaire. A bitter battle took place between about 1,500 national guardsmen from the 13th arrondissement and the Mouffetard district, commanded by Walery Antoni Wróblewski, a Polish exile who had participated in the 1863 uprising against the Russians, against three brigades commanded by General de Cissey.

During the course of the 25th, the insurgents lost the city hall of the 13th arrondissement and moved to a barricade on Place Jeanne-d'Arc, where 700 were taken prisoner. Wróblewski and some of his men escaped to the city hall of the 11th arrondissement, where he met Delescluze, the chief executive of the Commune. Several of the other Commune leaders, including Brunel, were wounded, and Pyat had disappeared. Delescluze offered Wróblewski the command of the Commune forces, which he declined, saying that he preferred to fight as a private soldier. At about seven-thirty, Delescluze put on his red sash of office, walked unarmed to the barricade on the Place du Château-d'Eau, climbed to the top and showed himself to the soldiers, and was promptly shot dead.

=== 26 May: Capture of Place de la Bastille; more executions ===
On the afternoon of 26 May, after six hours of heavy fighting, the regular army captured the Place de la Bastille. The National Guard still held parts of the 3rd Arrondissement, from the Carreau du Temple to the Arts-et-Metiers, and the National Guard still had artillery at their strongpoints at the Buttes-Chaumont and Père-Lachaise, from which they continued to bombard the regular army forces along the Canal Saint-Martin.

A contingent of several dozen national guardsmen led by Antoine Clavier, a commissaire, and Emile Gois, a colonel of the National Guard, arrived at La Roquette prison and demanded, at gunpoint, the remaining hostages there: ten priests, thirty-five policemen and gendarmes, and two civilians. They took them first to the city hall of the 20th arrondissement; the Commune leader of that district refused to allow his city hall to be used as a place of execution. Clavier and Gois took them instead to Rue Haxo. The procession of hostages was joined by a large and furious crowd of national guardsmen and civilians who insulted, spat upon, and struck the hostages. Arriving at an open yard, they were lined up against a wall and shot in groups of ten. National guardsmen in the crowd opened fire along with the firing squad. The hostages were shot from all directions, then beaten with rifle butts and stabbed with bayonets. According to Prosper-Olivier Lissagaray, a defender of the Commune, a total of 63 people were executed by the Commune during the bloody week.

=== 27–28 May: Final battles; executions at Père-Lachaise Cemetery ===
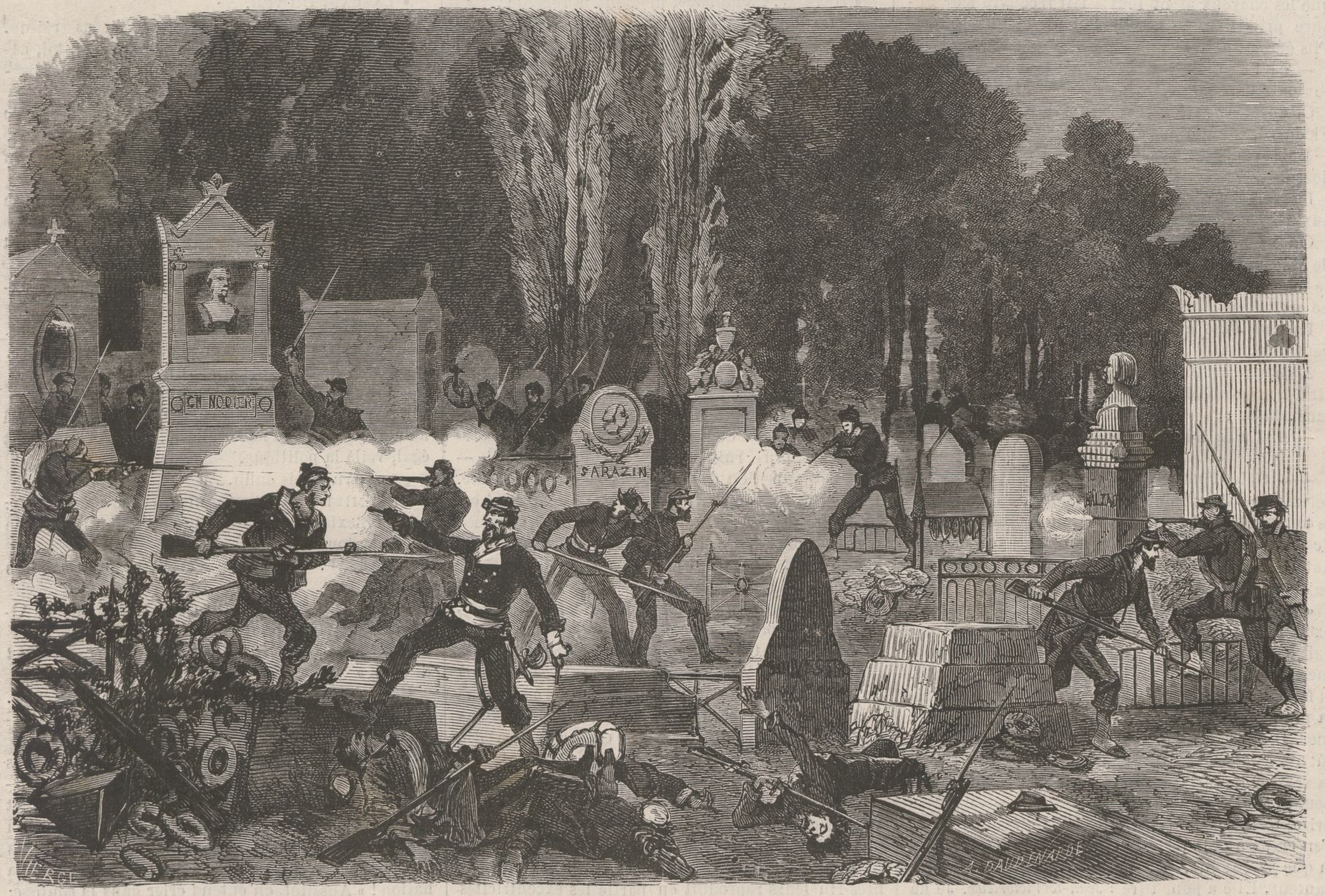
Last battles at Père-Lachaise

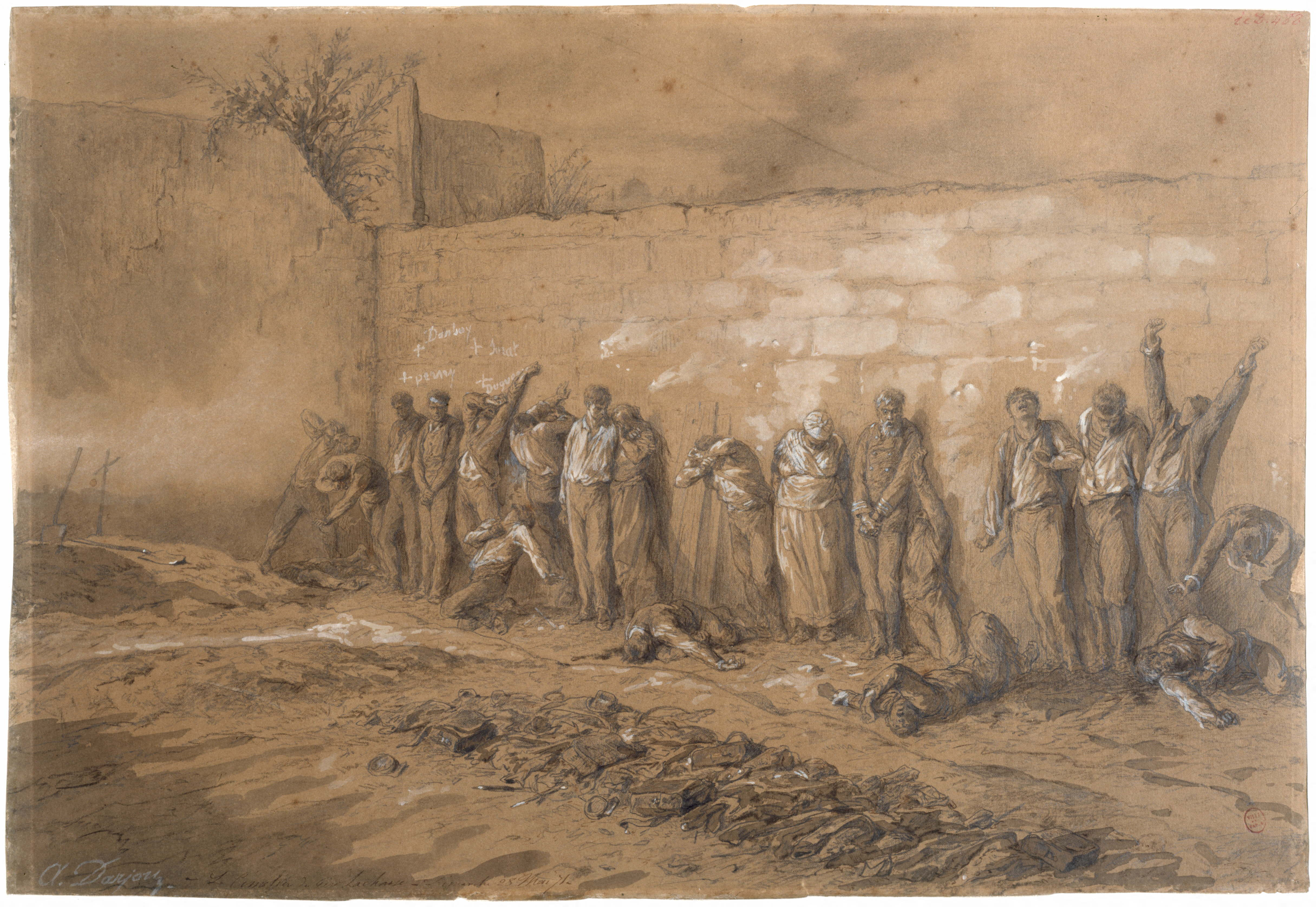
Execution of Communards at Père-Lachaise (Communards' Wall).

On the morning of 27 May, the regular army soldiers of Generals Grenier, Paul de Ladmirault and Jean-Baptiste Montaudon launched an attack on the National Guard artillery on the heights of the Buttes-Chaumont. The heights were captured at the end of the afternoon by the 1st Foreign Regiment of the French Foreign Legion. One of the last remaining strongpoints of the National Guard was the Père Lachaise Cemetery, defended by about 200 men. At 6 PM, the army used cannon to demolish the gates and the 1st Marine Infantry Regiment stormed the cemetery. Savage fighting followed around the tombs until nightfall, when the last Communards were taken prisoner. The captured guardsmen were taken to the wall of the cemetery and shot. Another group of prisoners, consisting of the National guard officers, was collected at Mazas Prison and La Roquette prison. They were given brief trials before the military tribunal, sentenced to death, and then delivered to Père Lachaise. There they were lined up in front of the same wall and executed in groups, and then buried with them in a common grave. This group include one woman, the only recorded execution of a woman by the army during the Bloody Week. The wall is now called the Communards' Wall, and is the site of annual commemorations of the Commune.

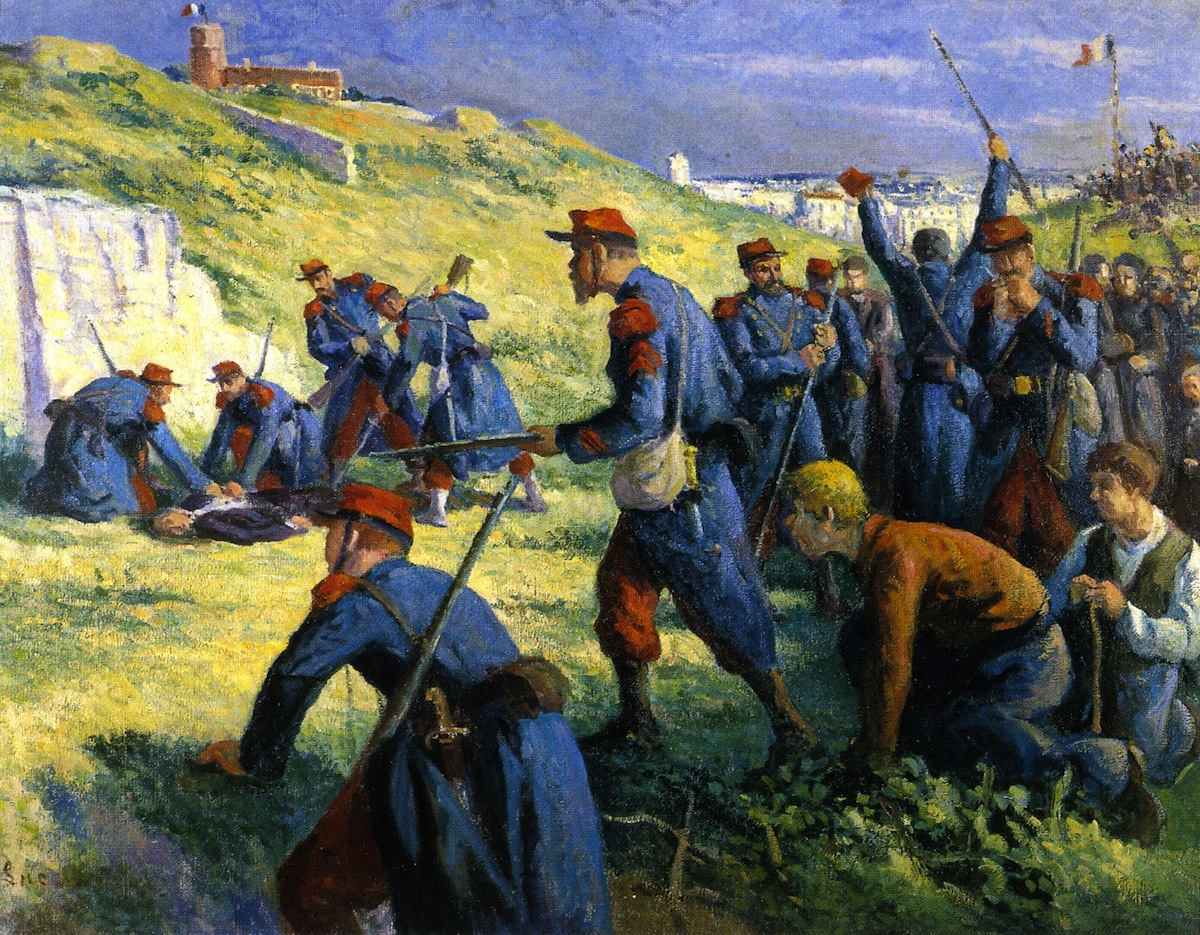
Eugène Varlin, one of the leaders of the Commune, was captured and shot by soldiers at Montmartre on 28 May, the last day of the uprising.

On 28 May, the regular army captured the remaining positions of the Commune, which offered little resistance. In the morning, the regular army captured La Roquette prison and freed the remaining 170 hostages. The army took 1,500 prisoners at the National Guard position on Rue Haxo, and 2,000 more at Derroja, near Père Lachaise. A handful of barricades at rue Ramponneau and Avenue de Tourville held out into the middle of the afternoon, when all resistance ceased.

== Communard prisoners and casualties ==
=== Prisoners and exiles ===
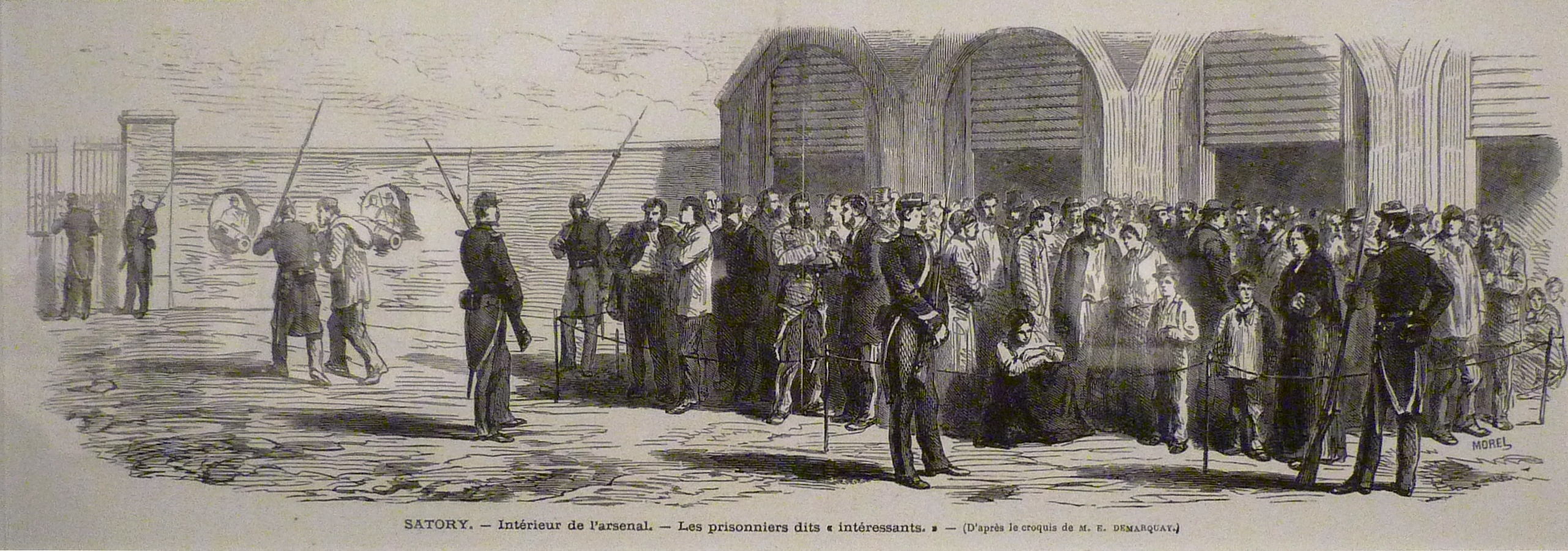
Communard prisoners at Satory camp

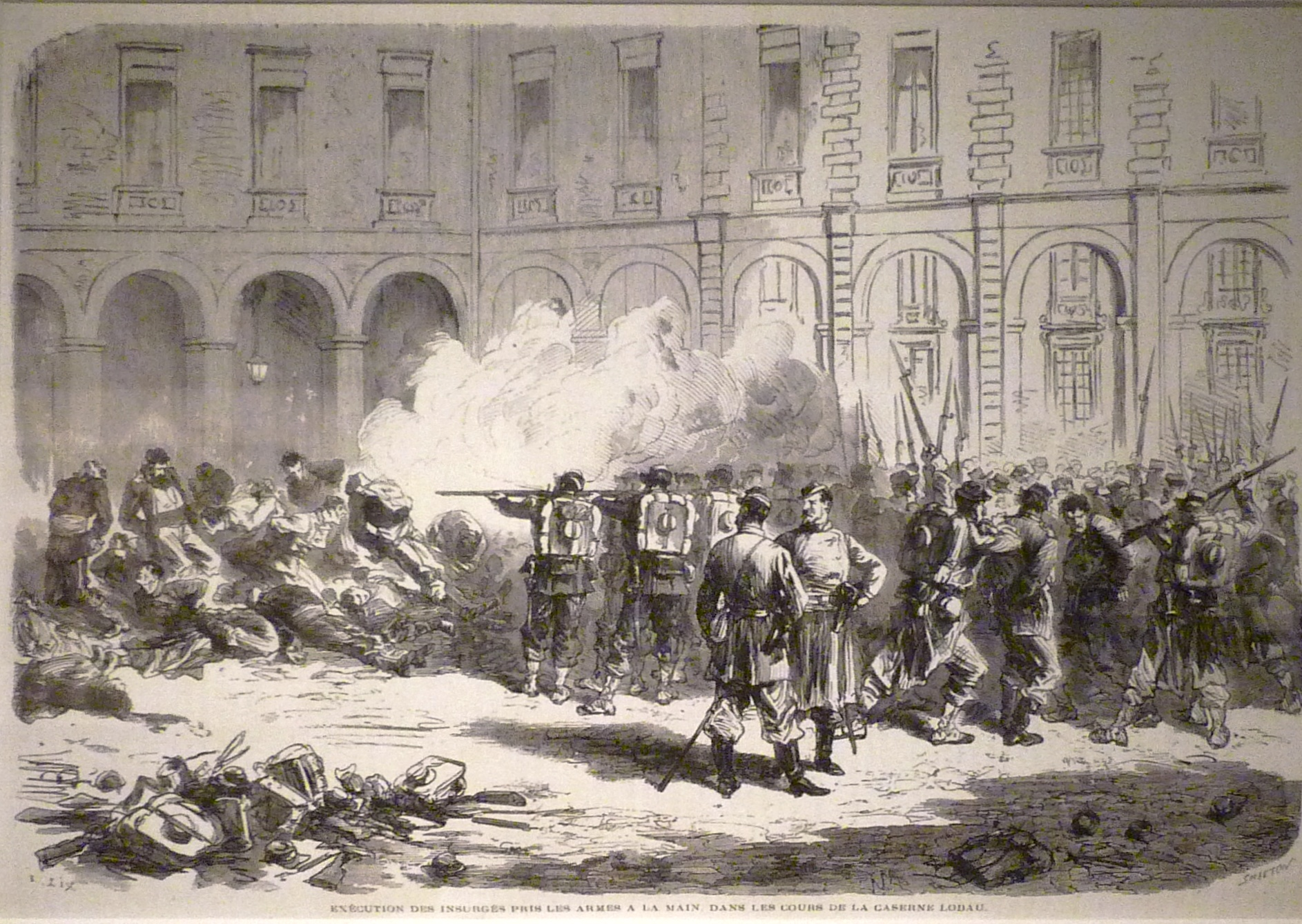
Mass execution of Communard prisoners in the Lobau barracks, engraving by Frédéric Lix

The French Army officially recorded the capture of 43,522 prisoners during and immediately after Bloody Week. Of these, 1,054 were women, and 615 were under the age of 16. They were marched in groups of 150 or 200, escorted by cavalrymen, to Versailles or the Camp de Satory, where they were held in extremely crowded and unsanitary conditions until they could be tried. More than half of the prisoners, 22,727, were released before trial for extenuating circumstances or on humanitarian grounds. Since Paris had been officially under a state of siege during the Commune, the prisoners were tried by military tribunals. Trials were held for 15,895 prisoners, of whom 13,500 were found guilty. Ninety-five were sentenced to death; 251 to forced labour; 1,169 to deportation, usually to New Caledonia; 3,147 to simple deportation; 1,257 to solitary confinement; 1,305 to prison for more than a year; and 2,054 to prison for less than a year.

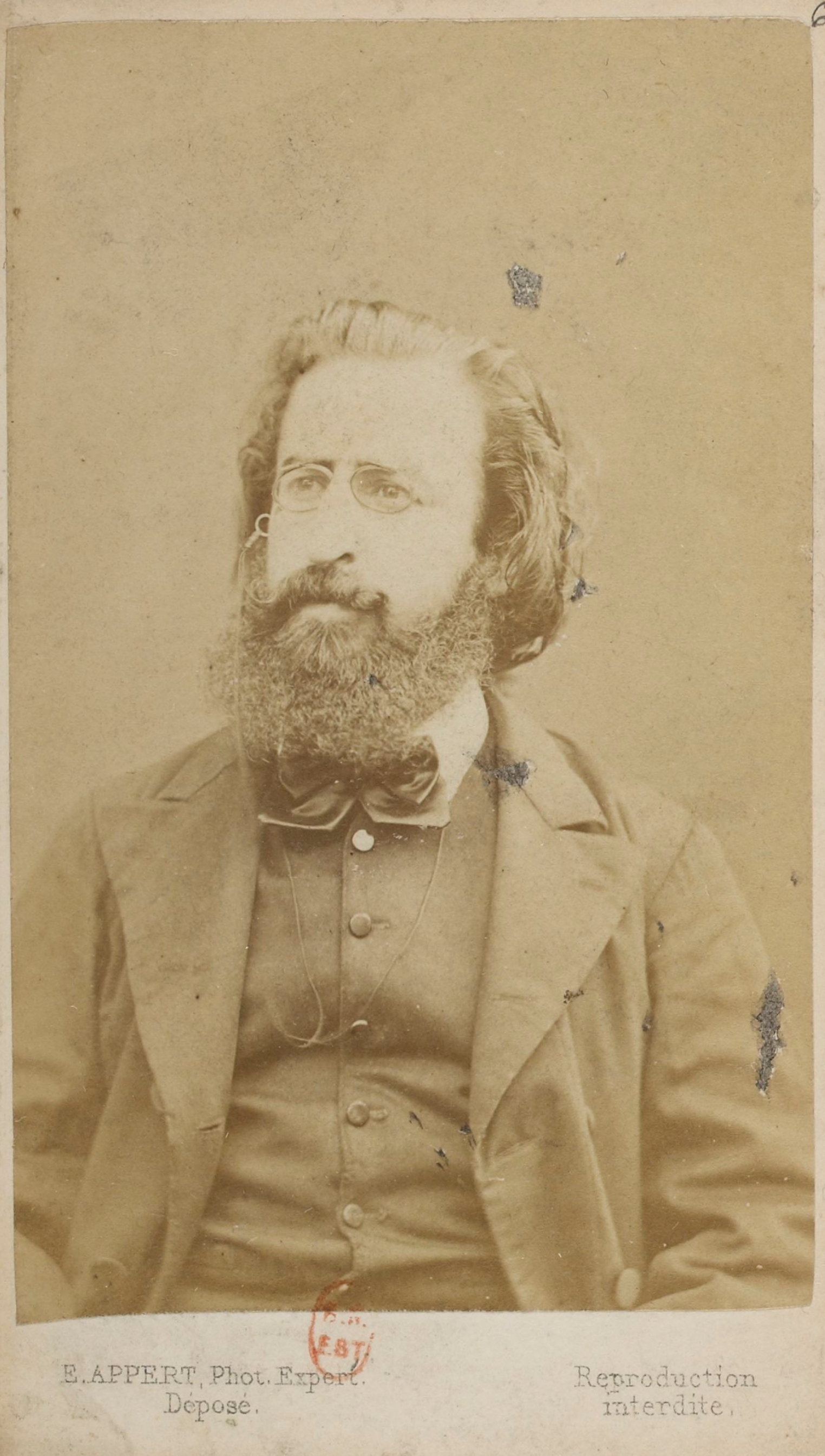
The Commune's deputy prosecutor Théophile Ferré, who handed over six hostages for execution, was executed in November 1871.

A separate and more formal trial was held beginning 7 August for the Commune leaders who survived and had been captured, including Théophile Ferré, who had signed the death warrant for the hostages, and the painter Gustave Courbet, who had proposed the destruction of the column in Place Vendôme. They were tried by a panel of seven senior army officers. Ferré was sentenced to death, and Courbet was sentenced to six months in prison, and later ordered to pay the cost of rebuilding the column. Serving part of his sentence in the Sainte-Pélagie Prison in Paris, he was allowed an easel and paints, but he could not have models pose for him. He did a famous series of still-life paintings of flowers and fruit. He was released, but was unable to pay for the rebuilding of the column. He went into exile in Switzerland and died before making a payment.

In October 1871 a commission of the National Assembly reviewed the sentences; 310 of those convicted were pardoned, 286 had their sentences reduced, and 1,295 commuted. Of the 270 condemned to death—175 in absentia—25 were shot, including Ferré and Gustave Genton, who had selected the hostages for execution. Thousands of Communards, including leaders such as Félix Pyat, succeeded in slipping out of Paris before the end of the battle, and went into exile; some 3,500 going to England, 2,000–3,000 to Belgium, and 1,000 to Switzerland.

A partial amnesty was granted on 3 March 1879, allowing 400 of the 600 deportees sent to New Caledonia to return, and 2,000 of the 2,400 prisoners sentenced in absentia. A general amnesty was granted on 11 July 1880, allowing the remaining 543 condemned prisoners, and 262 sentenced in absentia, to return to France.

=== Casualties ===
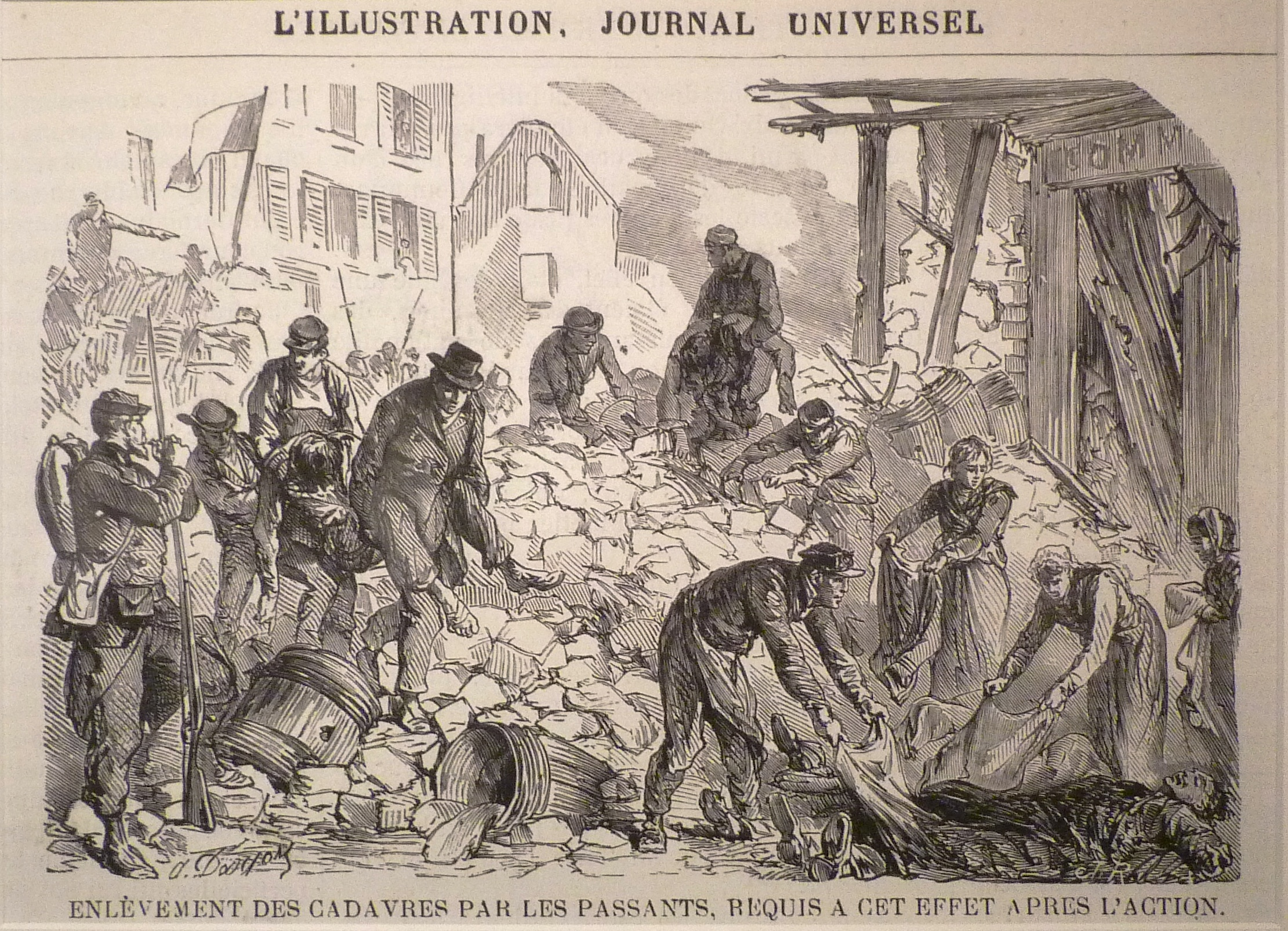
When the battle was over, Parisians buried the bodies of the Communards in temporary mass graves. They were quickly moved to the public cemeteries, where between 6,000 and 7,000 Communards were buried.

Historians have long debated the number of Communards killed during Semaine sanglante (Bloody Week). The official army report by General Félix Antoine Appert mentioned only Army casualties, which amounted, from April through May, to 877 killed, 6,454 wounded, and 183 missing. The report assessed information on Communard casualties only as "very incomplete". The issue of casualties during the Bloody Week arose at a National Assembly hearing on 28 August 1871, when Marshal MacMahon testified. Deputy M. Vacherot told him, "A general has told me that the number killed in combat, on the barricades, or after the combat, was as many as 17,000 men." MacMahon responded, "I don't know what that estimate is based upon; it seems exaggerated to me. All I can say is that the insurgents lost a lot more people than we did." Vacherot continued, "Perhaps this number applies to all of the siege, and to the fighting at Forts d'Issy and Vanves." MacMahon replied, "the number is exaggerated." Vacherot persisted, "It was General Appert who gave me that information. Perhaps he meant both dead and wounded." MacMahon replied, "That's a different matter."

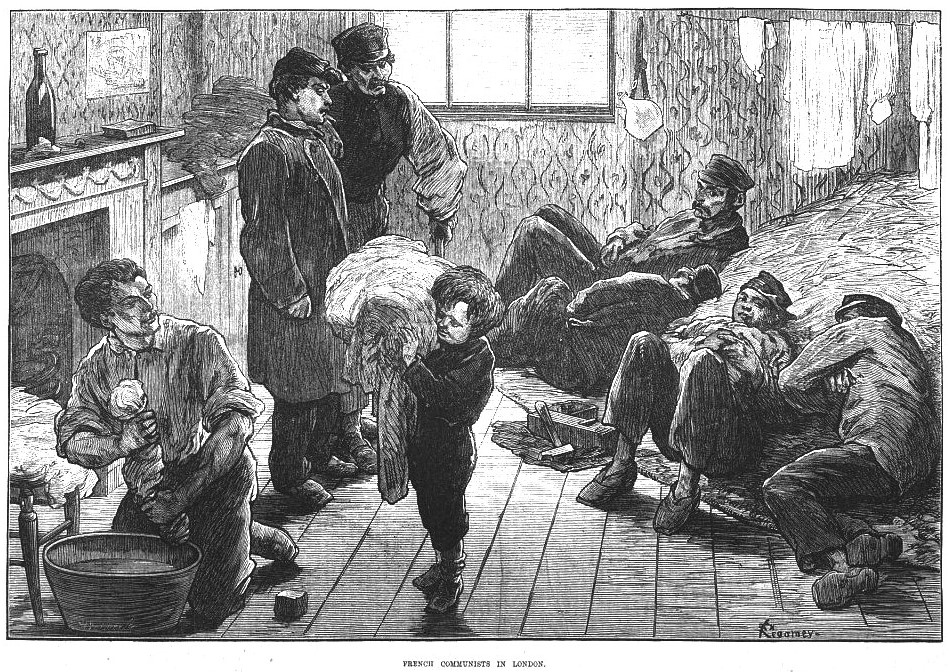
Communard exiles in London, June 1872

In 1876 Prosper-Olivier Lissagaray, who had fought on the barricades during Bloody Week, and had gone into exile in London, wrote a highly popular and sympathetic history of the Commune. At the end, he wrote: "No one knows the exact number of victims of the Bloody Week. The chief of the military justice department claimed seventeen thousand shot." This was inaccurate; Appert made no such claim, he referred only to prisoners. "The municipal council of Paris," Lissagaray continued, "paid for the burial of seventeen thousand bodies; but a large number of persons were killed or cremated outside of Paris." Later historians, including Robert Tombs, could not find the source Lissagaray cited for the city payment for seventeen thousand burials, and Lissagaray provided no evidence that thousands of Communards were cremated or buried outside Paris. "It is no exaggeration," Lissagaray concluded, "to say twenty thousand, a number admitted by the officers." But neither MacMahon or Appert had "admitted" that twenty thousand were killed, they both said the number was exaggerated.

In a new 1896 edition, Lissagaray wrote that the twenty thousand estimate included those killed not only in Paris, but also in the other Communes that broke out in France at the same time, and those killed in fighting outside Paris before the Bloody Week. Several historians repeated versions of Lissagaray's estimate, among them Pierre Milza ("...As many as twenty thousand"), Alfred Cobban and Benedict Anderson. Vladimir Lenin said that Lissagaray's estimate demonstrated ruling-class brutality: "20,000 killed in the streets... Lessons: bourgeoisie will stop at nothing."

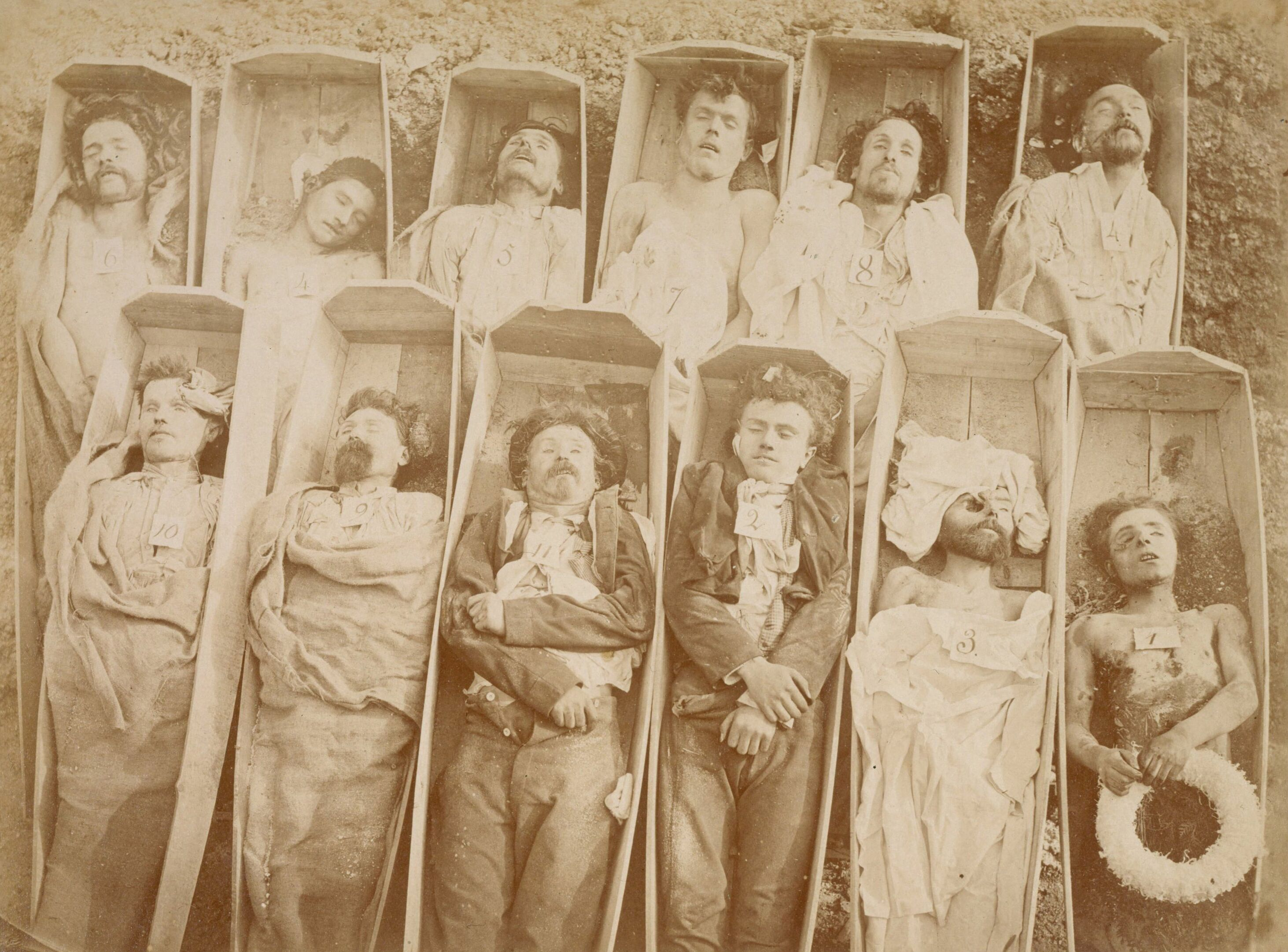
Communards killed in 1871

Between 1878 and 1880, a French historian and member of the Académie Française, Maxime Du Camp, wrote a new history Les Convulsions de Paris. Du Camp had witnessed the last days of the Commune, went inside the Tuileries Palace shortly after the fires were put out, witnessed the executions of Communards by soldiers, and the bodies in the streets. He studied the question of the number of dead, and studied the records of the office of inspection of the Paris cemeteries, which was in charge of burying the dead. Based on their records, he reported that between 20 and 30 May, 5,339 Communard corpses had been taken from the streets or Paris morgue to the city cemeteries for burial. Between 24 May and 6 September, the office of inspection of cemeteries reported that an additional 1,328 corpses were exhumed from temporary graves at 48 sites, including 754 corpses inside the old quarries near Parc des Buttes-Chaumont, for a total of 6,667.

Marxist critics attacked du Camp and his book; Collette Wilson called it "a key text in the construction and promulgation of the reactionary memory of the Commune" and Paul Lidsky called it "the bible of the anti-Communard literature." In 2012, however, supporting du Camp's research, historian Robert Tombs made a new study of the Paris cemetery records and placed the total number killed between 6,000 and 7,000, estimating around 1,400 of those to have been executed and the rest being killed in combat or dying from wounds received during the fighting. Jacques Rougerie, who had earlier accepted the 20,000 figure, wrote in 2014, "the number ten thousand victims seems today the most plausible; it remains an enormous number for the time."

The debate was still underway in 2021. A new book was published by mathematician Michele Audin in May 2021, to commemorate the 150th anniversary of The Commune. Citing cemetery and police records which she said had not been consulted by Tombs and other earlier historians, she wrote that "more than ten thousand" and "certainly fifteen thousand" Communards had been killed in the "Bloody Week".

The number killed during the "Bloody Week", usually estimated at ten to fifteen thousand or possibly more, was extraordinarily high by historical standards. Eight years before the Bloody Week, during the three days of the Battle of Gettysburg in July 1863, the deadliest battle of the American Civil War, a total of 7,863 soldiers, both Confederate and Union, were killed, or about half as many as the estimated Commune casualties. The number may have equalled or exceeded the number executed during the Reign of Terror during the French Revolution, when, following June 1793, 16,594 official death sentences were carried out throughout France.

== Critique ==
=== Contemporary artists and writers ===
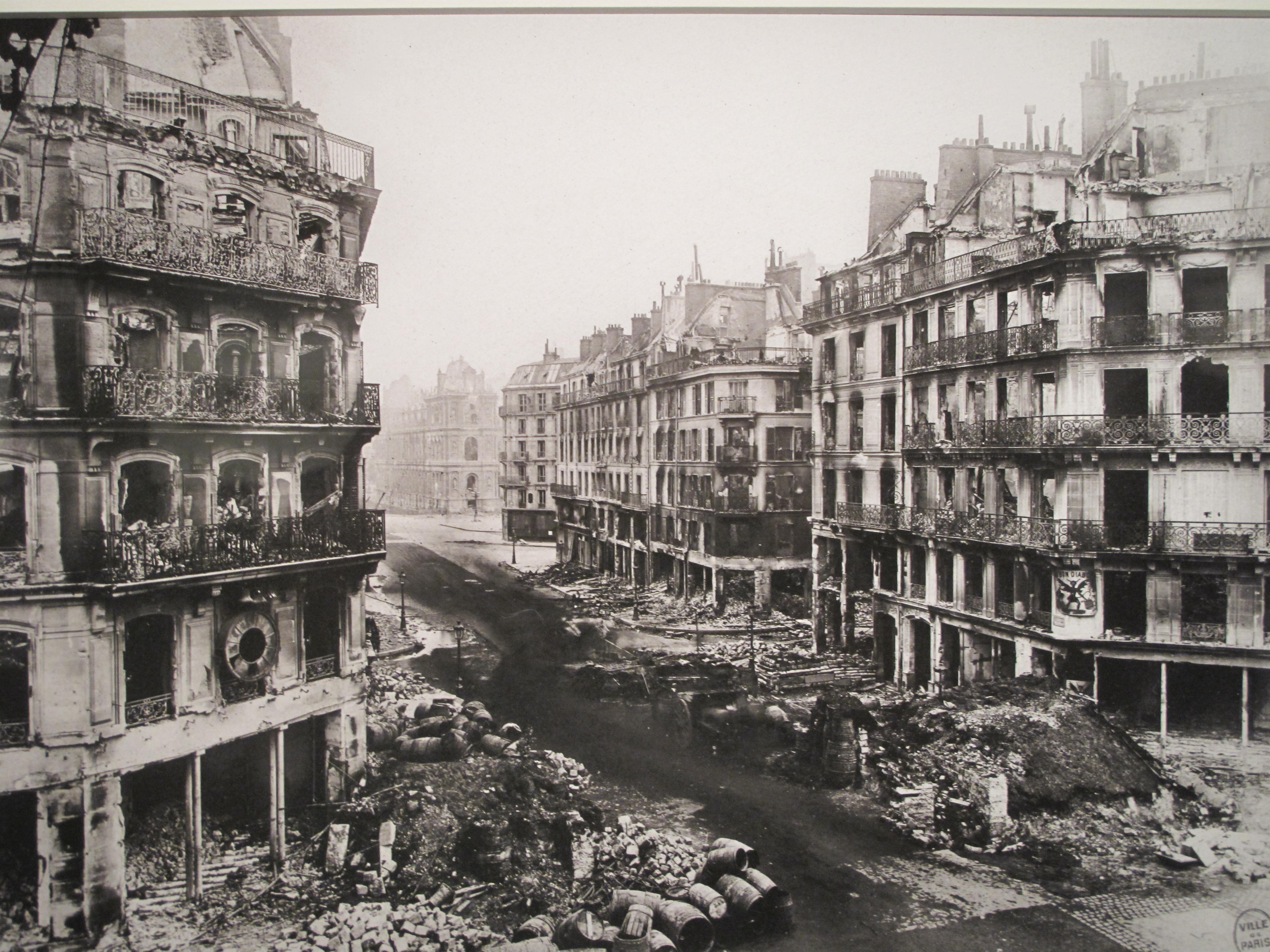
View of the Rue de Rivoli after Bloody Week

French writers and artists had strong views about the Commune. Gustave Courbet was the most prominent artist to take part in the Commune, and was an enthusiastic participant and supporter, though he criticised its executions of suspected enemies. On the other side, the young Anatole France described the Commune as "A committee of assassins, a band of hooligans [fripouillards], a government of crime and madness." The diarist Edmond de Goncourt wrote, three days after La Semaine Sanglante: "the bleeding has been done thoroughly, and a bleeding like that, by killing the rebellious part of a population, postpones the next revolution. ... The old society has twenty years of peace before it."

On 23 April, George Sand, an ardent republican who had taken part in the 1848 revolution, took the opposite view. She wrote "The horrible adventure continues. They ransom, they threaten, they arrest, they judge. They have taken over all the city halls, all the public establishments, they're pillaging the munitions and the food supplies." Soon after the Commune began, Gustave Flaubert wrote to Sand, "Austria did not go into Revolution after Sadowa, nor Italy after Novara, nor Russia after Sebastopol! But our good Frenchmen hasten to pull down their house as soon as the chimney takes fire." Near the end of the Commune, Flaubert wrote to her again, "As for the Commune, which is about to die out, it is the last manifestation of the Middle Ages." On 10 June, when the Commune was finished, Flaubert wrote to Sand:

I come from Paris, and I do not know whom to speak to. I am suffocated. I am quite upset, or rather out of heart. The sight of the ruins is nothing compared to the great Parisian insanity. With very rare exceptions, everybody seemed to me only fit for the strait-jacket. One half of the population longs to hang the other half, which returns the compliment. That is clearly to be read in the eyes of the passers-by.

Victor Hugo blamed Thiers for his short-sightedness. At the news that the government had failed to have the cannons seized he wrote in his diary, "He touched off the fuse to the powder keg. Thiers is premeditated thoughtlessness." On the other hand, he was critical of the Commune but sympathetic to the Communards. At the beginning of April, he moved to Brussels to take care of the family of his son, who had just died. On 9 April, he wrote, "In short, this Commune is as idiotic as the National Assembly is ferocious. From both sides, folly." He wrote poems that criticized both the government and the Commune's policy of taking hostages for reprisals, and condemned the destruction of the Vendôme Column. On 25 May, during the Bloody Week, he wrote: "A monstrous act; they've set fire to Paris. They've been searching for firemen as far away as Brussels." But after the repression, he offered to give sanctuary to members of the Commune, which, he said, "was barely elected, and of which I never approved." He became the most vocal advocate of an amnesty for exiled Communards, finally granted in the 1880s.

Émile Zola, as a journalist for Le Sémaphore de Marseille, reported on the fall of the Commune, and was one of the first reporters to enter the city during Bloody Week. On 25 May he reported: "Never in civilised times has such a terrible crime ravaged a great city. ... The men of the Hôtel de Ville could not be other than assassins and arsonists. They were beaten and fled like robbers from the regular army, and took vengeance upon the monuments and houses. ... The fires of Paris have pushed over the limit the exasperation of the army. ... Those who burn and who massacre merit no other justice than the gunshot of a soldier." But on 1 June, when the fighting was over, his tone had changed, "The court martials [sic] are still meeting and the summary executions continue, less numerous, it's true. The sound of firing squads, which one still hears in the mournful city, atrociously prolongs the nightmare. ... Paris is sick of executions. It seems to Paris that they're shooting everyone. Paris is not complaining about the shooting of the members of the Commune, but of innocent people. It believes that, among the pile, there are innocent people, and that it's time that each execution is preceded by at least an attempt at a serious inquiry. ... When the echoes of the last shots have ceased, it will take a great deal of gentleness to heal the million people suffering nightmares, those who have emerged, shivering from the fire and massacre."

=== Anarchists ===
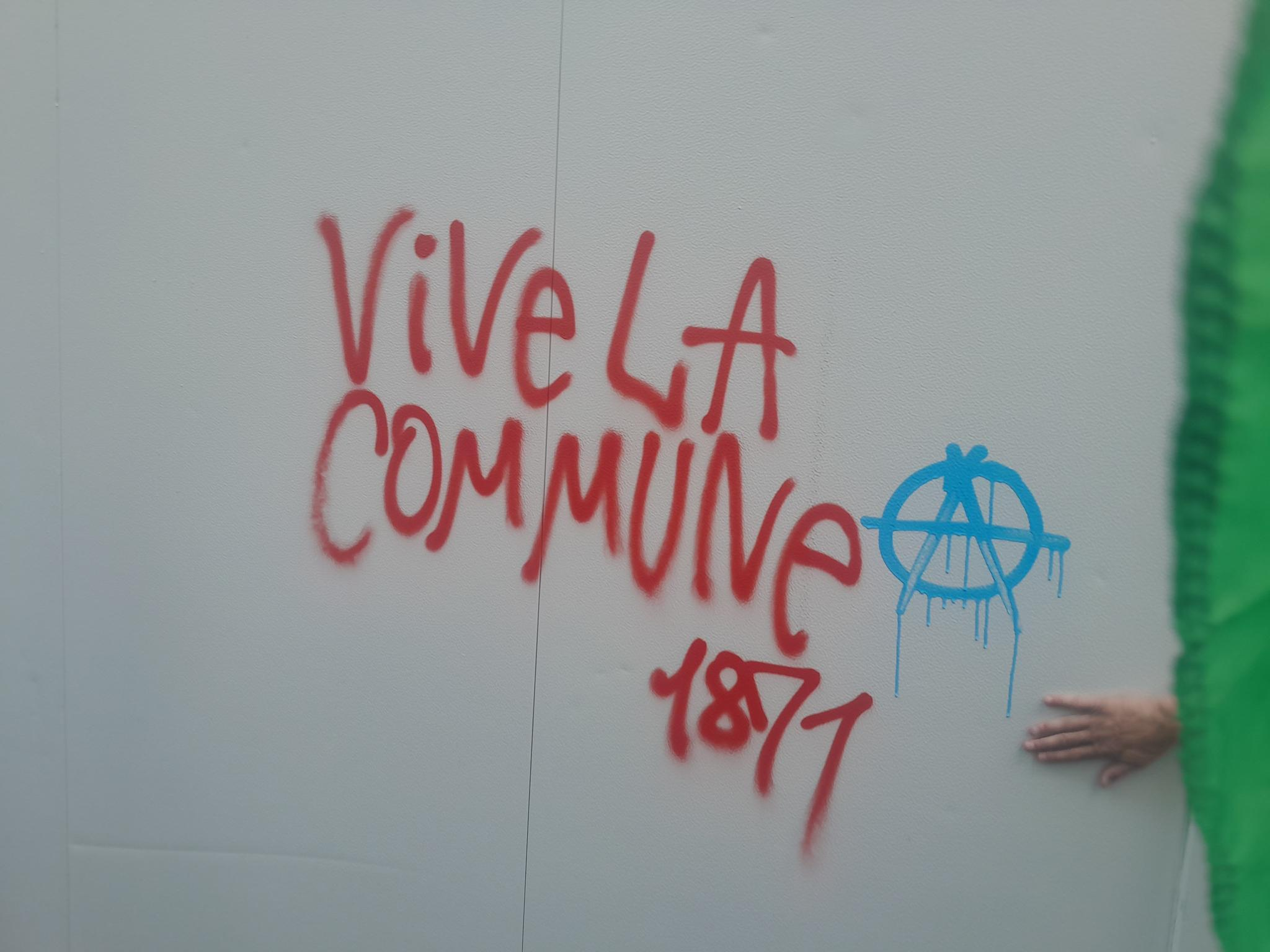
A companion's hand, Anarchist A and 'Vive la Commune' graffiti during the demonstration of 1 May 2026 in Paris

The anarchist philosopher George Woodcock said that "a notable contribution to the activities of the Commune and particularly to the organization of public services was made by members of various anarchist factions, including the mutualists Courbet, Longuet, and Vermorel, the libertarian collectivists Varlin, Malon, and Lefrangais, and the Bakuninists Elie and Elisée Reclus and Louise Michel." Anarchist Mikhail Bakunin was a strong supporter of the Commune. He saw the Commune as above all a "rebellion against the State," and commended the Communards for rejecting not only the State but also revolutionary dictatorship.

Louise Michel was an important participant in the Paris Commune, though she was not formally introduced to anarchist doctrines until her exile after the Commune. Initially she worked as an ambulance woman, treating those injured on the barricades. During the Siege of Paris, she untiringly preached resistance to the Prussians. On the establishment of the Commune, she joined the National Guard. She offered to shoot Thiers, and suggested the destruction of Paris by way of vengeance for its surrender. In December 1871, she was brought before the 6th council of war and charged with offences including trying to overthrow the government, encouraging citizens to arm themselves, and herself using weapons and wearing a military uniform. Defiantly, she vowed to never renounce the Commune, and dared the judges to sentence her to death. According to court records, Michel told the court, "Since it seems that every heart that beats for freedom has no right to anything but a little slug of lead, I demand my share. If you let me live, I shall never cease to cry for vengeance." Michel was sentenced to penal transportation. Following the 1871 Paris Commune, the anarchist movement, as with the whole of the workers' movement, was decapitated and severely crippled for years.

=== Marxism ===
Communists, left-wing socialists, anarchists, and others have seen the Commune as a model for, or a prefiguration of, a liberated society, with a political system based on participatory democracy from the grassroots up. Marx and Engels, Mikhail Bakunin, and later Lenin, drew major theoretical lessons (in particular as regards the "dictatorship of the proletariat" and the "withering away of the state") from the experience of the Commune.

Marx, in The Civil War in France (1871), written during the Commune, praised the Commune's achievements, and described it as the prototype for a revolutionary government of the future, "the form at last discovered" for the emancipation of the proletariat. Marx wrote that, "Working men's Paris, with its Commune, will be forever celebrated as the glorious harbinger of a new society. Its martyrs are enshrined in the great heart of the working class. Its exterminators, history has already nailed to that eternal pillory from which all of the prayers of their priest will not avail to redeem them."

Later, however, in private, Marx expressed a different, more critical view of the Commune. In 1881, in a letter to a Dutch friend, Nieuwenhuis, he wrote: "The Commune was simply the rebellion of a city in exceptional circumstances, and furthermore, the majority of the Commune was in no way socialist, and could not have been. With a little bit of good sense, they might, however, have obtained a compromise with Versailles favourable to the mass of the people, which was in fact the only real possibility."

Engels echoed his partner, maintaining that the absence of a standing army, the self-policing of the "quarters", and other features meant that the Commune was no longer a "state" in the old, repressive sense of the term. It was a transitional form, moving towards the abolition of the state as such. He used the famous term later taken up by Lenin and the Bolsheviks: the Commune was, he said, the first "dictatorship of the proletariat", a state run by workers and in the interests of workers. But Marx and Engels also analyzed what they perceived to be the weaknesses or errors of the commune, including its inability to link up with the rest of the French people, its failure to completely re-organize state machinery, its Central Committee passing over power too soon to the representative assembly, its failure to immediately pursue the retreating bourgeois, and the failure to recognize the possibility that France and Prussia would unite against the commune.

The other point of disagreement was the anti-authoritarian socialists' opposition to the Communist conception of conquest of power and of a temporary transitional state: the anarchists were in favour of general strike and immediate dismantlement of the state through the constitution of decentralised workers' councils, as those seen in the Commune.

Lenin, like Marx, considered the Commune a living example of the "dictatorship of the proletariat". But he criticised the Communards for not having done enough to secure their position, highlighting two errors in particular. The first was that the Communards "stopped half way ... led astray by dreams of ... establishing a higher [capitalist] justice in the country ... such institutions as the banks, for example, were not taken over". Secondly, he thought their "excessive magnanimity" had prevented them from "destroying" the class enemy. For Lenin, the Communards "underestimated the significance of direct military operations in civil war; and instead of launching a resolute offensive against Versailles that would have crowned its victory in Paris, it tarried and gave the Versailles government time to gather the dark forces and prepare for the blood-soaked week of May".

In 1926, Mao Zedong published The Importance of Commemorating the Paris Commune. Similarly to Lenin's analysis, Mao wrote that there were two reasons for the Commune's failure: (1) it lacked a united and disciplined party to lead it, and (2) it was too benevolent towards its enemies.

=== Other commentary ===
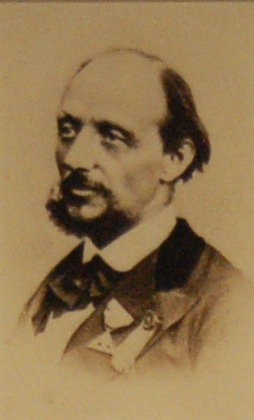
National Guard commander Jules Bergeret escaped Paris during the Bloody Week and went into exile in New York, where he died in 1905.

The American Ambassador in Paris during the Commune, Elihu Washburne, writing in his personal diary which is quoted at length in noted historian David McCullough's book The Greater Journey (Simon & Schuster 2011), described the Communards as "brigands", "assassins", and "scoundrels"; "I have no time now to express my detestation ... [T]hey threaten to destroy Paris and bury everybody in its ruins before they will surrender."

Edwin Child, a young Londoner working in Paris, noted that during the Commune, "the women behaved like tigresses, throwing petroleum everywhere and distinguishing themselves by the fury with which they fought". However, it has been argued in recent research that these famous female arsonists of the Commune, or pétroleuses, may have been exaggerated or a myth. Lissagaray claimed that because of this myth, hundreds of working-class women were murdered in Paris in late May, falsely accused of being pétroleuses, but he offered no evidence to support his claim. Lissagaray also claimed that artillery fire by the French army was responsible for probably half of the fires that consumed the city during the Bloody Week. However, photographs of the ruins of the Tuileries Palace, the Hotel de Ville, and other prominent government buildings that burned show that the exteriors were untouched by cannon fire, while the interiors were completely gutted by fire; and prominent Communards such as Jules Bergeret, who escaped to live in New York, proudly claimed credit for the most famous acts of arson.

== Academic dispute over Thiers' handling of the crisis ==
Historian J. P. T. Bury considers that Thiers tackled the crisis in a ruthless but successful way, thus giving a solid base to the Third Republic. In Bury's words: "the exile of so many extremists enabled the new Republic to [...] develop in a peaceful and orderly fashion."

This view is shared by French historian Alain Plessis, who writes that "the crushing of the communards [...] was ultimately to facilitate the advent of the Third Republic."

For David Thomson, Thiers had no other option to restore the unity of a country fractured by an overwhelming defeat and innumerable factions.

Another French historian, Paul Lidsky, argues that Thiers felt urged by mainstream newspapers and leading intellectuals to take decisive action against "the social and democratic vermin" (Le Figaro), "those abominable ruffians" (Countess of Ségur).

Even a moderate daily newspaper like le Drapeau tricolore wrote, "even though we were to drown this uprising in blood, were we to bury it under the ruins of the burning city, there would be no room for compromise."

Theodore Zeldin in France 1848–1945, vol.I goes so far as to say Thiers deliberately ordered Paris to be evacuated in order to incite part of the population to rise up and eventually have a pretext for crushing Paris as a rebellious force.

== Influence and legacy ==
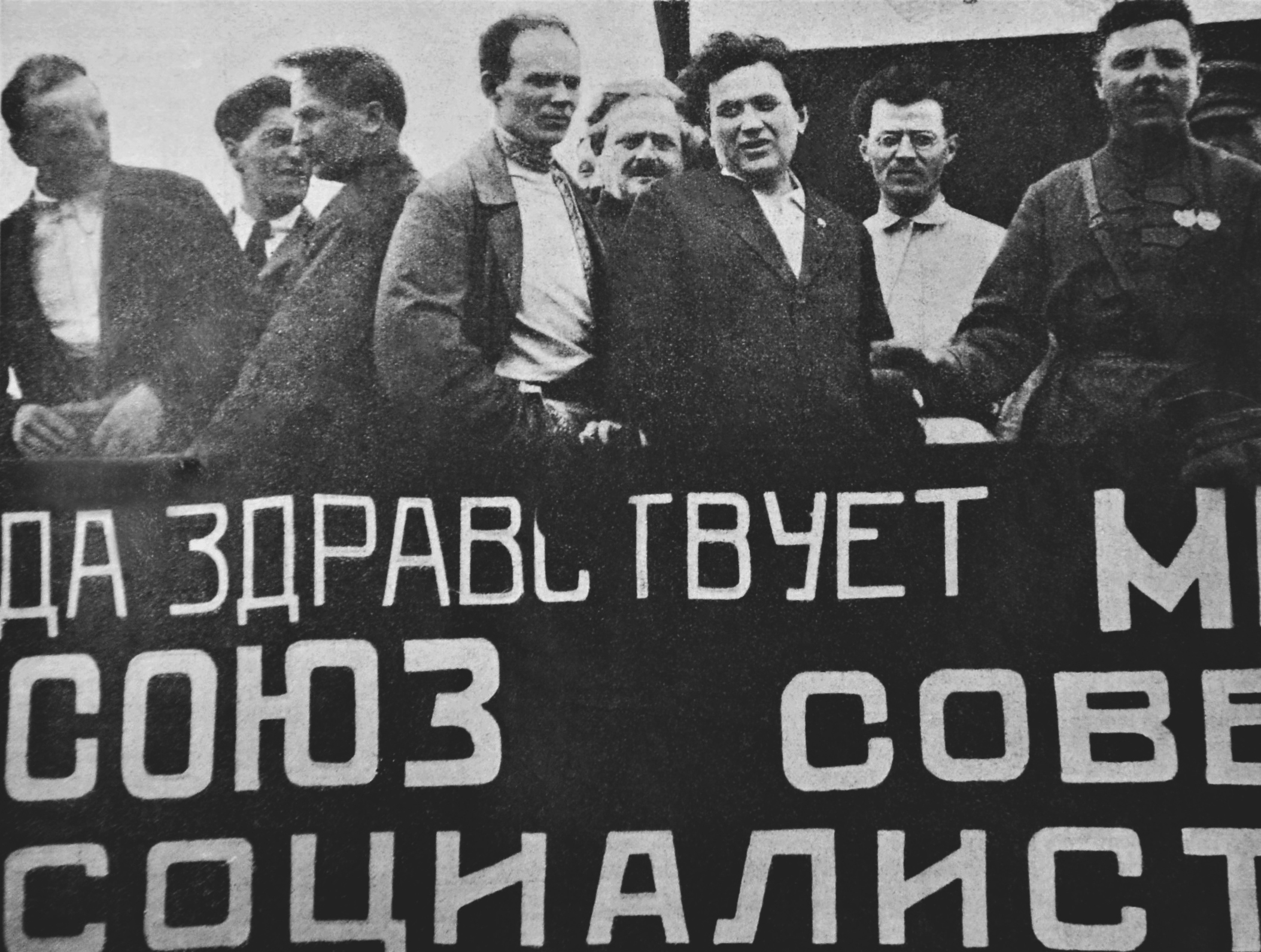
The red banner from the Commune brought to Moscow by French communists in June 1924. Kliment Voroshilov is at right, Grigory Zinoviev third from right, Avel Enukidze fourth, and Nikolay Antipov fifth.

The Paris Commune inspired other uprisings named or called Communes: in Moscow (December 1905); Hungary (March–July 1919); Canton (December 1927), most famously, Petrograd (1917), and Shanghai, 1927 and Shanghai, 1967. The Commune was regarded with admiration and awe by later Communist and leftist leaders. Vladimir Lenin identified the Russian soviets as the contemporary forms of the Commune and wrote: "We are only dwarves perched on the shoulders of those giants." He celebrated by dancing in the snow in Moscow on the day that his Bolshevik government was more than two months old, surpassing the Commune. The ministers and officials of the Bolshevik government were given the title Commissar, which was borrowed directly from the Commissaires of the Commune. Lenin's Mausoleum in Moscow was (and still is) decorated with red banners from the Commune, brought to Moscow in 1924 by French communists. Stalin wrote: "In 1917 we thought that we would form a commune, an association of workers, and that we would put an end to bureaucracy...That is a goal that we are still far from reaching." The Bolsheviks renamed their dreadnought battleship Sevastopol to Parizhskaya Kommuna. In the years of the Soviet Union, the spaceflight Voskhod 1 carried part of a Communard banner.

The Communards inspired many anarchists, such as Paul Brousse, Errico Malatesta, Carlo Cafiero, and Andrea Costa. By taking up arms, they spread their ideas faster and more forcefully than they would have with the written word. The historian Zoe Baker writes that "while a person must find, buy, and read a book or newspaper for it to radicalise them, an insurrection rapidly gains the attention of large numbers of people, including those who cannot read, and puts them in a position where they must take a side in the ongoing struggle."

The National Assembly decreed a law on 24 July 1873 for the construction of the Basilica of Sacré-Cœur on Montmartre, near the location of the cannon park and where General Clément-Thomas and General Lecomte were killed, specifying that it be erected to "expiate the crimes of the Commune". A plaque and a church, Notre-Dame-des-Otages (Our Lady of the Hostages) on Rue Haxo mark the place where fifty hostages, including priests, gendarmes and four civilians, were shot by a firing squad.

A plaque also marks the wall in Père Lachaise Cemetery where 147 Communards were executed, commonly known as the Communards' Wall. Memorial commemorations are held at the cemetery every year in May to remember the Commune. Another plaque behind the Hôtel de Ville marks the site of a mass grave of Communards shot by the army. Their remains were later reburied in city cemeteries.

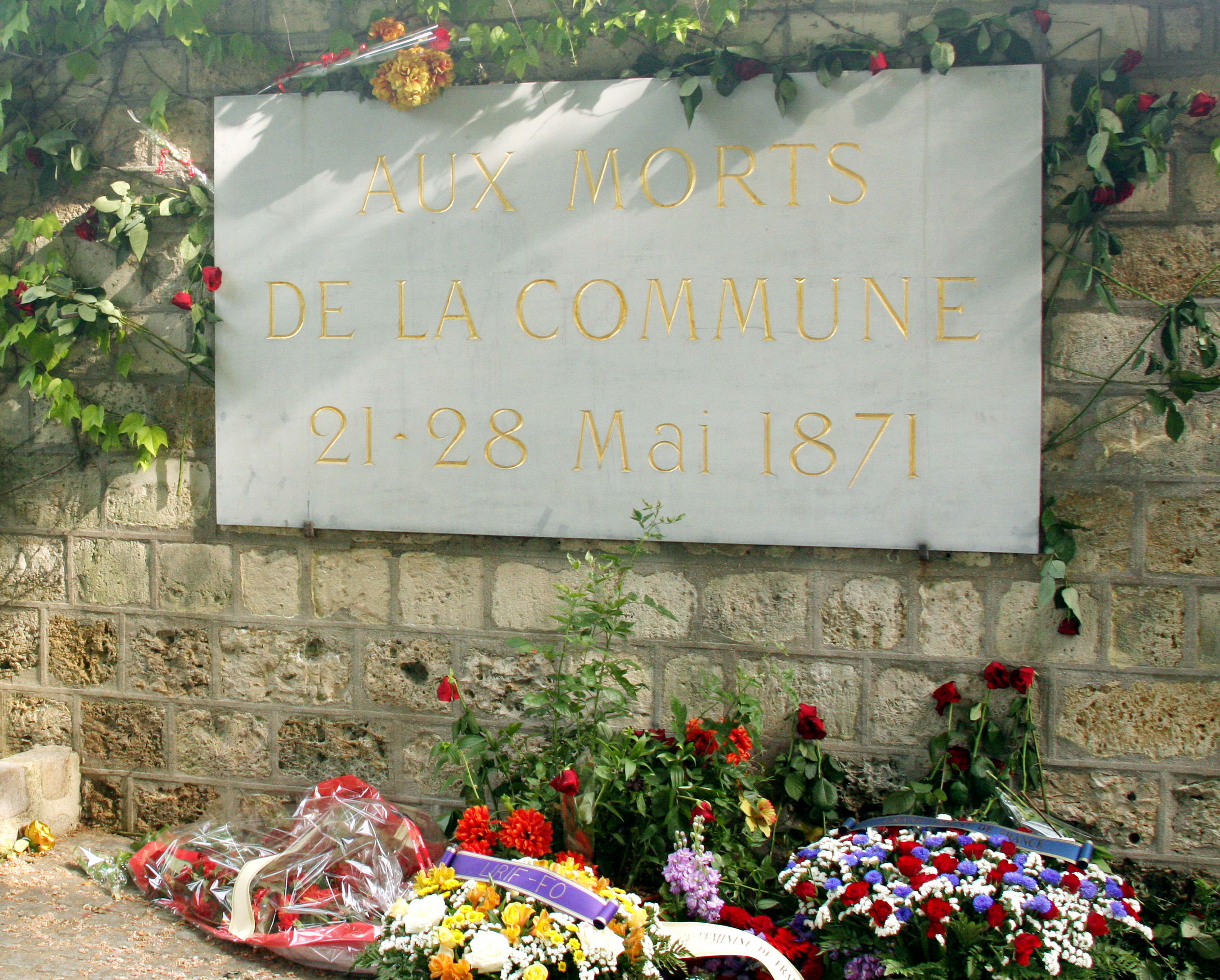
A plaque honours the dead of the Commune in Père Lachaise Cemetery.

There are several locations named after the Paris Commune. Including the Place de la Commune-de-Paris in Paris, the Straße der Pariser Kommune in Berlin, Germany, the Komunardů in Prague, Czech Republic, and the Công xã Paris Square in Ho Chi Minh City, Vietnam.

The Paris Commune was a recurring theme during China's Cultural Revolution. When students put up the first big character poster following the 16 May Notification, Mao Zedong described it as the "declaration of China's twentieth-century Paris Commune". In the Cultural Revolution's early period, the spontaneity of everyday life and mass political participation during the Paris Commune became lessons to be learned. For example, 8 August 1966 "Decision of the Central Committee of the Chinese Communist Party concerning the Great Proletarian Revolution" stated, "It is necessary to institute a system of general elections, like that of the Paris Commune, for electing members to the cultural revolutionary groups and committees and delegates to the cultural revolutionary congresses." During the phase of the Cultural Revolution where mass political mobilization was trending downward, the Shengwulian (an ultraleft group in Hunan province) modeled its ideology on the radically egalitarian nature of the Paris Commune.

Pol Pot, the leader of Khmer Rouge was also inspired by Paris Commune and said the Commune had been overthrown because the proletariat had failed to exercise dictatorship over the bourgeoisie. He would not make the same mistake.

In 2021, Paris commemorated the 150th anniversary of the Commune with "a series of exhibitions, lectures and concerts, plays and poetry readings" lasting from March through May. The Mayor of Paris, Anne Hidalgo, planted a memorial Araucaria tree native to New Caledonia in Montmartre; New Caledonia is where thousands of Communards were deported after the Commune was suppressed. The city's plans to commemorate the Commune proved controversial, evoking protest from right-wing members of the city council.

According to BBC News, as of 2021, supporters of the Paris Commune view it as "a springtime of hope bloodily repressed by the forces of conservatism", while members of the political right view the Commune as "a time of chaos and class vengeance. They remembered the killings of priests and the burning of landmarks like the Hôtel de Ville."

=== Other communes of 1871 ===
Soon after the Paris Commune took power in Paris, revolutionary and socialist groups in several other French cities tried to establish their own communes. The Paris Commune sent delegates to the large cities to encourage them. The longest-lasting commune outside Paris was that of Marseille, from 23 March to 4 April, which was suppressed with the loss of thirty soldiers and one hundred and fifty insurgents. None of the other Communes lasted more than a few days, and most ended with little or no bloodshed.

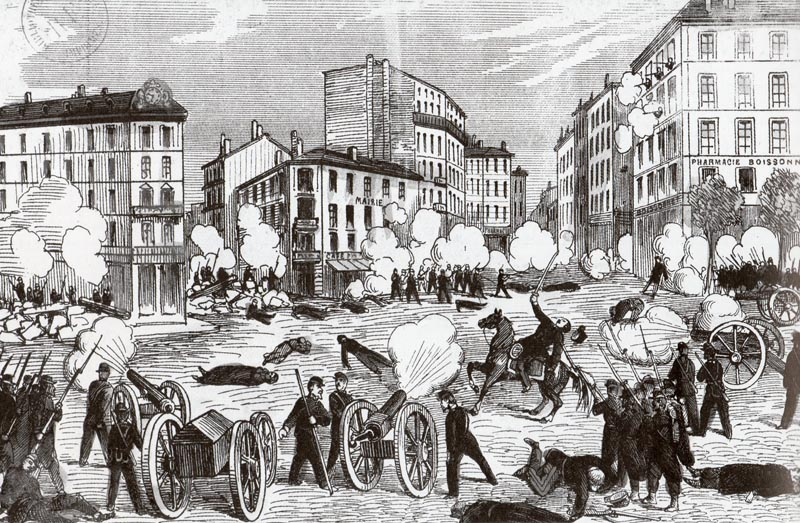
Army attack on the insurgents entrenched around the town hall of La Guillotière, on 30 April and 1 May 1871, the last episode of the Lyon Commune

- Lyon. The Lyon Commune was a short-lived revolutionary movement in Lyon. Lyon had a long history of worker's movements and uprisings. On 28 September 1870, even before the Paris Commune, the anarchist Mikhail Bakunin and socialist Paul Clusaret led an unsuccessful attempt to seize the Hôtel de Ville (City Hall), but were stopped, arrested and expelled from the city by national guardsmen who supported the Republic. On 22 March, when the news of the seizure of power by the Paris Commune reached Lyon, socialist and revolutionary members of the National Guard met and heard a speech by a representative of the Paris Commune. They marched to the city hall, occupied it, and established a Commune of fifteen members, of whom eleven were militant revolutionaries. They arrested the mayor and the prefect of the city, hoisted a red flag over the city hall, and declared support for the Paris Commune. A delegate from the Paris Commune, Charles Amouroux, spoke to an enthusiastic crowd of several thousand people in front of the city hall. However, the following day the national guardsmen from other neighborhoods gathered at the city hall, held a meeting, and put out their own bulletin, declaring that the takeover was a "regrettable misunderstanding," and declared their support for the government of the Republic. On 24 March, the four major newspapers of Lyon also repudiated the Commune. On 25 March, the last members of the Commune resigned and left the city hall peacefully. The Commune had lasted only two days.
- Saint-Étienne. On 24 March, inspired by the news from Paris, a crowd of republican and revolutionary workers and national guardsmen invaded the Hôtel de Ville (City Hall) of Saint-Étienne, and demanded a plebiscite for the establishment of a Commune. Revolutionary members of the National Guard and a unit of regular army soldiers supporting the Republic were both outside the city. The prefect, an engineer named de L'Espée, was meeting with a delegation from the National Guard in his office when a shot was fired outside, killing a worker. The national guardsmen stormed the city hall, capturing the prefect. In the resulting chaos, more shots were fired and the prefect was killed. The National Guard members quickly established an executive committee, sent soldiers to occupy the railway station and telegraph office, and proclaimed a Commune, with elections to be held on 29 March. However, on the 26th, the more moderate republican members of the National Guard disassociated themselves from the Commune. An army unit entered the city on the morning of 28 March and went to the city hall. The few hundred revolutionary national guardsmen still at the city hall dispersed quietly, without any shots being fired.
- Marseille. Even before the Commune, Marseille had a strongly republican mayor and a tradition of revolutionary and radical movements. On 22 March, socialist politician Gaston Cremieux addressed a meeting of workers in Marseille and called upon them to take up arms and to support the Paris Commune. Parades of radicals and socialists took to the street, chanting "Long live Paris! Long live the Commune!" On 23 March, the Prefect of the city called a mass meeting of the National Guard, expecting they would support the government; but, instead, the national guardsmen, as in Paris, stormed the Hôtel de Ville (City Hall) and took the mayor and prefect prisoner. They declared a Commune, led by a commission of six members, later increased to twelve, composed of both revolutionaries and moderate socialists. The military commander of Marseille, General Henry Espivent de la Villeboisnet, withdrew his troops from the city, along with many city government officials, to Aubagne, to see what would happen. The revolutionary commission soon split into two factions, one in the city hall and the other in the prefecture, each claiming to be the legal government of the city. On 4 April, General Espivent, with six to seven thousand regular soldiers supported by sailors and National Guard units loyal to the Republic, entered Marseille, where the Commune was defended by about 2,000 national guardsmen. The regular army forces laid siege to the prefecture, defended by about 400 national guardsmen. The building was bombarded by artillery and then stormed by the soldiers and sailors. About 30 soldiers and 150 insurgents were killed. As in Paris, insurgents captured with weapons in hand were executed, and about 900 others were imprisoned. Gaston Cremieux was arrested, condemned to death in June 1871, and executed five months later.
- Besançon. The Besançon Commune originated from the emergence of unions, including a section of International Workingmen's Association, in connection with the future Jura Federation. An insurrection in Besançon was planned for late May or early June 1871; the plan was abandoned following Semaine sanglante.
- Other cities. There were attempts to establish Communes in other cities. A radical government briefly took charge in the industrial town of Le Creusot, from 24 to 27 March, but left without violence when confronted by the army. The Capitole (City Hall), prefecture and arsenal of Toulouse were taken over by revolutionary national guardsmen on 24 March, but handed back to the army without fighting on 27 March. There was a similar short-lived takeover of the city hall in Narbonne (23–28 March). In Limoges, no Commune was declared, but from 3 to 5 April revolutionary National Guard soldiers blockaded the Hôtel de Ville (City Hall), mortally wounded an army colonel, and briefly prevented a regular army unit from being sent to Paris to fight the Commune, before being themselves disarmed by the army.

=== Aftermath ===
- Adolphe Thiers was formally elected the first President of the French Third Republic on 30 August 1871. He was replaced by the more conservative Patrice MacMahon in 1873. In his final years, Thiers became an ally of the republicans against the constitutional monarchists in the Assembly. When he died in 1877, his funeral was a major political event. Historian Jules Ferry reported that a million Parisians lined the streets; the funeral procession was led by republican deputies Leon Gambetta and Victor Hugo. He was buried in Père Lachaise Cemetery, where one of the final battles of the Commune had been fought.
- Patrice MacMahon, leader of the regular army that crushed the Commune, served as the president of the Third Republic from 1873 to 1879. When he died in 1893, he was buried with the highest military honours at Les Invalides.
- Georges Clemenceau, the mayor of Montmartre at the beginning of the Commune, became the leader of the Radical Party in the National Assembly. He was Prime Minister of France during the pivotal years of World War I, and signed the Versailles Treaty, restoring Alsace-Lorraine to France.

Some leaders of the Commune, including Delescluze, died on the barricades, but most of the others survived and lived long afterwards, and some of them resumed political careers in France. Between 1873 and 1876, 4,200 political prisoners were sent to the penal colony of New Caledonia. The convicts included about one thousand Communards, including Henri de Rochefort and Louise Michel.

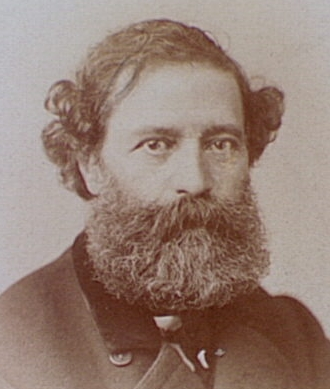
The popular journalist Félix Pyat became one of the most influential members of the Commune and its Committee for Public Safety. He went into exile during the Bloody Week, was later amnestied, and eventually was elected to the National Assembly.

- The most remarkable comeback was that of Commune leader Felix Pyat, who had been a former military leader of the Commune, and member of the Committee of Public safety. On the Commune he organised the destruction of the column in Place Vendome, as well as the demolition of the home of Adolphe Thiers and the expiatory chapel to Louis XVI. He escaped Paris during Bloody Week, was condemned to death in absentia in 1873, and went into exile in England. After the general amnesty in 1881 he returned to Paris, and in March 1888 was elected to the National Assembly for the department of Bouches-du-Rhône. He took his seat on the extreme Left; he died at Saint-Gratien the following year.
- Louis Auguste Blanqui had been elected the honorary President of the Commune, but was in prison for its duration. He was given a sentence in a penal colony in 1872, but because of his health the sentence was changed to imprisonment. He was elected Deputy of Bordeaux in April 1879, but was disqualified. After he was released from prison, he continued his career as an agitator. He died after giving a speech in Paris in January 1881. Like Adolphe Thiers, he is buried in Père Lachaise Cemetery, where one of the last battles of the Commune was fought.
- Louise Michel, the famous "Red Virgin", was sentenced to transportation to a penal colony in New Caledonia, where she served as a schoolteacher. She received amnesty in 1880, and returned to Paris, where she resumed her career as an activist and anarchist. She was arrested in 1880 for leading a mob that pillaged a bakery, was imprisoned, then pardoned. She was arrested several more times, and once was freed with the intervention of Georges Clemenceau. She died in 1905, and was buried near her close friend and colleague during the Commune, Théophile Ferré, the man who had signed the death warrant for the archbishop of Paris and other hostages.
- Adrien Lejeune, the last surviving communard, settled in the Soviet Union in 1928 where he died in 1942.

=== In fiction ===
==== Poetry ====
- Among the first to write about the Commune was Victor Hugo, whose poem "Sur une barricade", written on 11 June 1871 and published in 1872 in a collection of poems under the name L'Année terrible, honours the bravery of a twelve-year-old Communard being led to the execution squad.
- William Morris' sequence of poems, "The Pilgrims of Hope" (1885), features a climax set in the Commune.

==== Novels ====
- Contes du lundi is a collection of novels written by Alphonse Daudet, published in 1873, set during the Franco-Prussian war and the Paris Commune.
- Jules Vallès, editor of Le Cri du Peuple, wrote a trilogy Jacques Vingtras: L'Enfant, Le Bachelier, L'insurgé, between 1878 and 1880, the complete novels being published only in 1886, after his death.
- Émile Zola's 1892 novel La Débâcle is set against the background of the Franco-Prussian War, the Battle of Sedan and the Paris Commune.
- British writer Arnold Bennett's 1908 novel The Old Wives' Tale, is in part set in Paris during the Commune.
- Guy Endore's 1933 horror novel The Werewolf of Paris is set during the Paris Commune and contrasts the savagery of the werewolf with the savagery of La Semaine Sanglante.
- French writer Jean Vautrin's 1998 novel Le Cri du Peuple deals with the rise and fall of the Commune. The Prix Goncourt-winning novel is an account of the tumultuous events of 1871, told in free indirect style from the points of view of a police officer and a Communard whose lives are intertwined by the murder of a child and love for an Italian woman called Miss Pecci. The novel begins with the discovery of the corpse of a woman dumped in the Seine and the subsequent investigation in which the two main protagonists, Grondin and Tarpagnan, are involved. The title is drawn from the eponymous Communard newspaper, Le Cri du Peuple, edited by Jules Vallès. The book itself is supposedly his account. Painter Gustave Courbet also makes an appearance.
- In The Prague Cemetery, Italian author Umberto Eco sets chapter 17 against the background of the Paris Commune.
- The Queen of the Night by Alexander Chee (2016) depicts the survival of fictional opera singer Lilliet Berne during the siege of Paris. The novel's heroine also interacts with several notable figures of the day, including George Sand and the Empress Eugénie de Montijo.
- Several popular British and American novelists of the late 19th century depicted the Commune as a tyranny against which Anglo-Americans and their aristocratic French allies heroically pitted themselves. Among the most well-known of these anti-Commune novels are Woman of the Commune (1895, AKA A Girl of the Commune) by G. A. Henty and in the same year, The Red Republic: A Romance of the Commune by Robert W. Chambers.
- In Marx Returns by the British writer and filmmaker Jason Barker, the Commune provides the historical context to Karl Marx's revolutionary struggles, and is depicted "as a symbol of an unfinished political project".

==== Theatre ====
- At least three plays have been set in the Commune: Nederlaget by Nordahl Grieg, Die Tage der Commune by Bertolt Brecht, and Le Printemps 71 by Arthur Adamov.
- Berlin performance group Showcase Beat le Mot created Paris 1871 Bonjour Commune (first performed at Hebbel am Ufer in 2010), the final part of a tetralogy dealing with failed revolutions.
- New York theatre group The Civilians performed Paris Commune in 2004 and 2008.

==== Film ====
- Of the numerous films set in the Commune, particularly notable is La Commune, which runs for 5¾ hours and was directed by Peter Watkins. It was made in Montreuil in 2000, and as with most of Watkins' films uses ordinary people instead of actors to create a documentary effect. Some participants were the children of cast members from Watkin's masterpiece Edvard Munch (1974). La Commune was shot on film by Odd-Geir Saether, the Norwegian cameraman from the Munch film.
- Soviet filmmakers Grigori Kozintsev and Leonid Trauberg wrote and directed, in 1929, the silent film The New Babylon (Novyy Vavilon) about the Paris Commune. It features Dmitri Shostakovich's first film score.
- British filmmaker Ken McMullen has made two films directly or indirectly influenced by the Commune: Ghost Dance (1983) and 1871 (1990). Ghost Dance includes an appearance by French philosopher Jacques Derrida.
- Moinak Biswas, Indian filmmaker and professor of film studies at Jadavpur University in Kolkata, showed a split-screen entry connecting the work of 1970s Left filmmaker Ritwik Ghatak with contemporary shots of the Paris Commune at the 11th Shanghai Biennale (2016).

==== Other ====
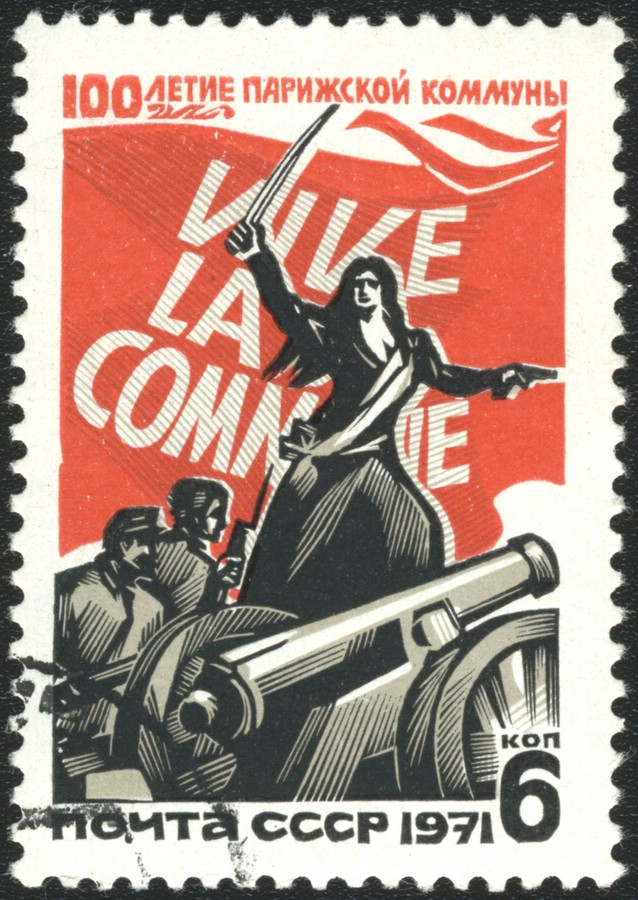
Soviet stamp of 1971 marking the Commune's centenary.

- Italian composer Luigi Nono wrote the opera Al gran sole carico d'amore (In the Bright Sunshine, Heavy with Love), which is based on the Paris Commune.
- Comics artist Jacques Tardi adapted Vautrin's novel (listed above) into a graphic novel, also called Le Cri du Peuple.
- In the long-running British TV series The Onedin Line (episode 27, screened 10 December 1972), shipowner James Onedin is lured into the Commune in pursuit of a commercial debt and finds himself under heavy fire.
- Two episodes of Young Sherlock are partially set in the Commune where it is implied that the villains' chemical weapons might be under consideration for use by the French National Guard, among other governments.

== See also ==
- Canton of Cartagena
- Crimes de la commune
- Roman Republic (1849–1850)
- Castilian War of the Communities
- Gustave Paul Cluseret
- Gustave Flourens
- Leó Frankel
- André Gill
- Paschal Grousset
- Historiography of the Paris Commune
- Paul Lafargue
- Édouard Manet
- Medieval commune
- Felix Nadar
- Eugène Edine Pottier
- Élisée Reclus
- Arthur Rimbaud
- Louis Rossel
- Jules Vallès
- Paul Verlaine
- January Storm
- Strandzha Commune
- Republic of Tarnobrzeg
- Pittsburgh railroad strike of 1877
- Pamyat Parizhskoy Kommuny
- Fires at the Paris Commune
- Capitol Hill Occupied Protest
- Theses on the Paris Commune
- Marseille Commune
- Uprising of March 18, 1871
- 1871 Internal Campaign
