= Eugène Despois =

French translator

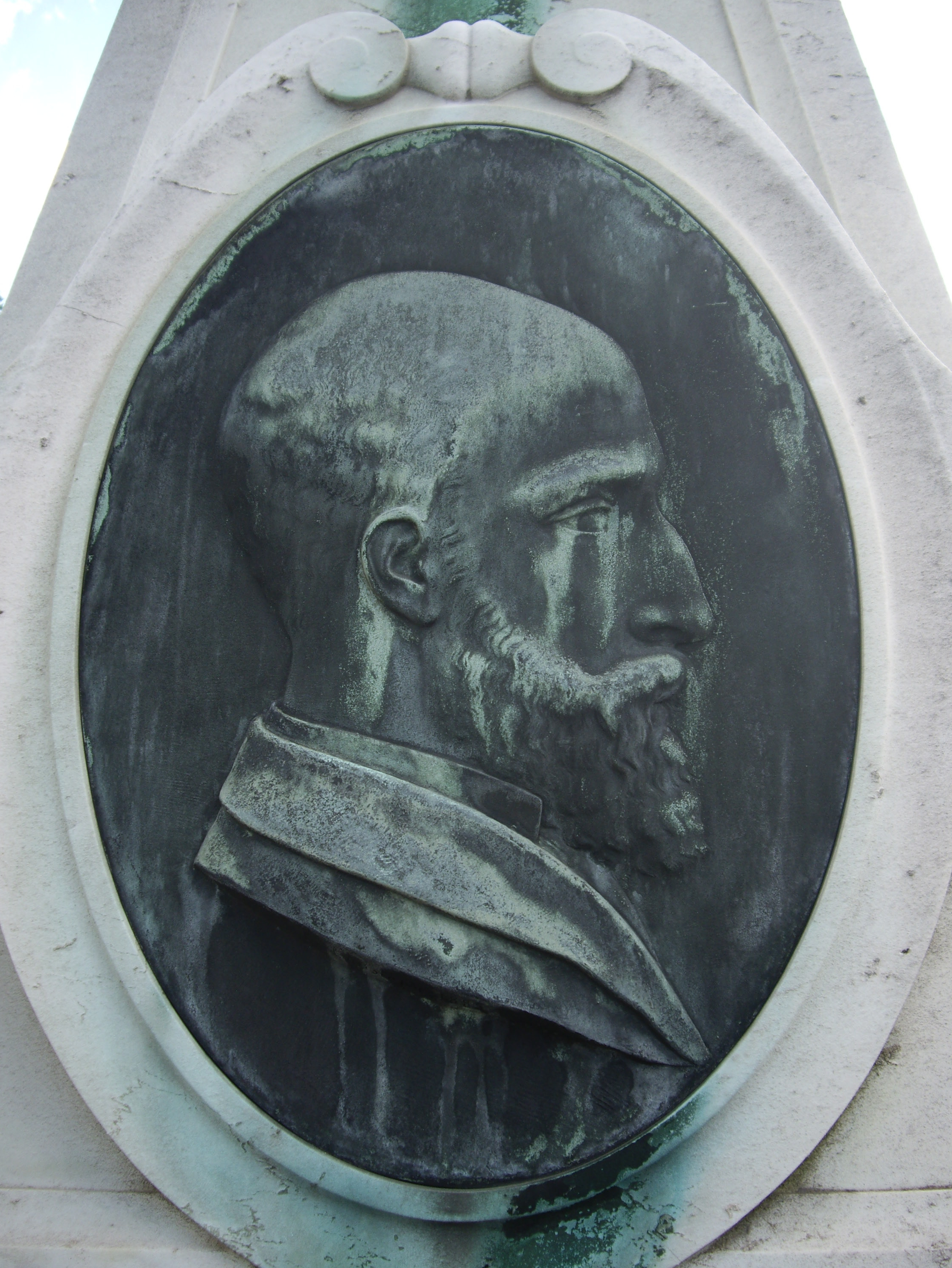
Médaillon Eugène Despois, Cimetière du Montparnasse

Eugène Despois (25 December 1818 – 23 September 1876) was a French translator, teacher and writer.

== Biography ==
Despois was born on christmas eve in 1818 in Paris. He taught Rhetorik at the University of Bourges and later in Paris. He retired from teaching after the coup d'etat of Napoléon III on 2 December 1851 and dedicated himself to writing. After 1870, he worked as a librarian at the Sorbonne University. He passed away at age 57 in 1876 in Paris.

Posthumously, Maxime Vuillaume honoured him as his "old master" in the journal Le Radical in 1895.

== Work ==
- La révolution d'Angleterre (1861).
- Les lettres et la liberté (1865).
- Le vandalisme révolutionnaire (1868).
- Le théâtre francais sous Louis XIV (1874, 2. Auflage 1882).
