= Le Fils du Père Duchêne =

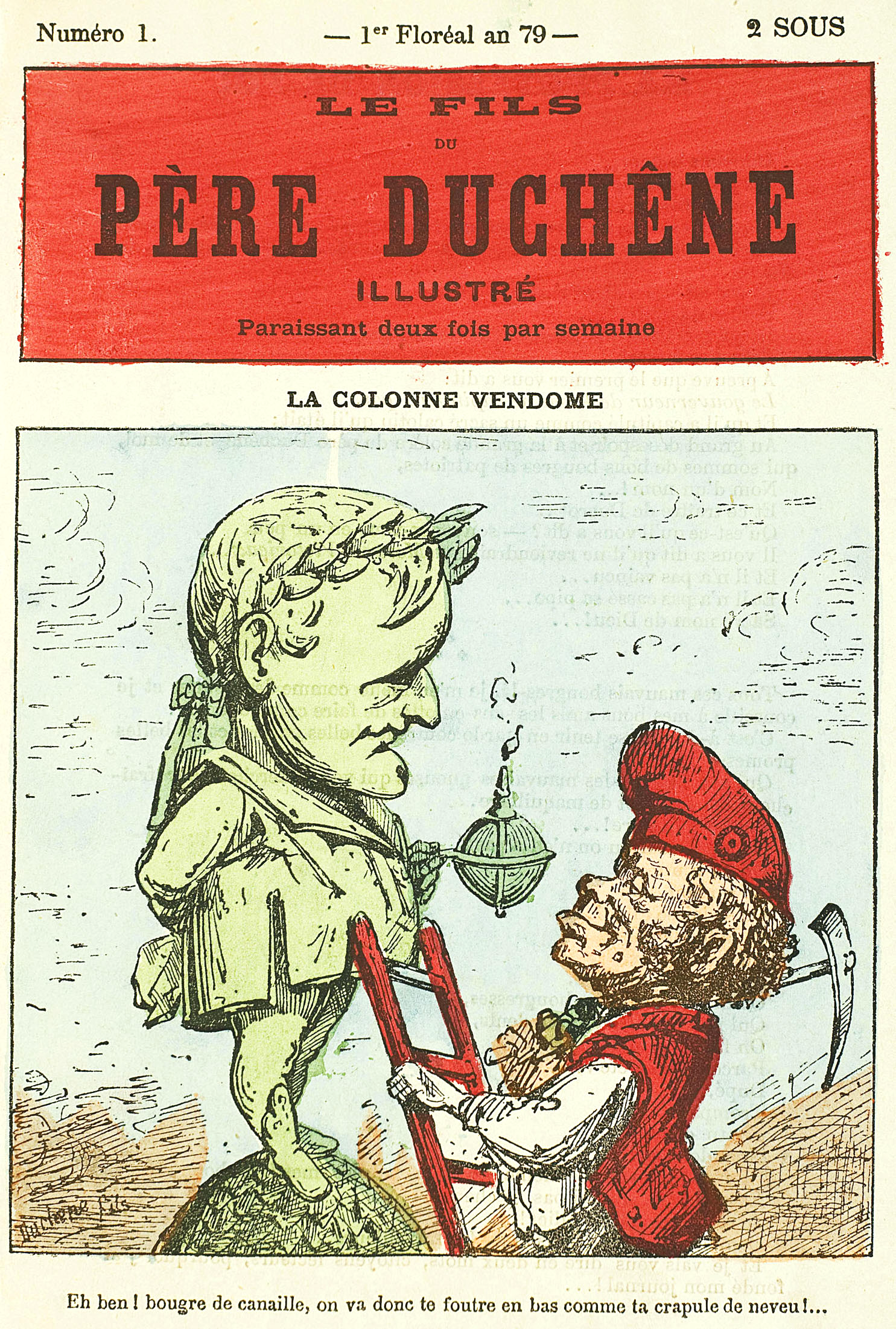
- Front page of the first issue of the journal (21 April 1871) - Père Duchêne facing the statue of Napoléon Bonaparte at the top of the Vendôme Column. The caption reads: Sooo! you dirty bugger, you're gonna get screwed down there like that scumbag nephew of yours [i.e.: Napoleon III]!...
- Founder(s): Maxime Vuillaume; Eugène Vermersch
- Founded: 1871
- Ceased publication: 1871
- Language: French
- Headquarters: Paris

Le Fils du Père Duchêne ("The Son of Father Duchêne") was a Communard caricature newspaper. Published by Maxime Vuillaume and Eugène Vermersch, who involved many Parisian caricaturists of the period, the publication followed almost the entire Paris Commune until the Semaine sanglante ('Bloody Week'), which it described in its final issue.

Its longevity and striking use of caricature make this publication one of the examples of art produced during the Paris Commune.

== History ==
=== Context ===
After the defeat of the Franco-Prussian War, the Parisian people, exhausted by the siege of the city and feeling betrayed by the provisional government, became increasingly revolutionary. This highly tense situation ultimately led to the birth of a significant insurrectionary and communal movement, the Paris Commune.

In this Communard and revolutionary context, the Neo-Hébertist press, in reference to the very radical Jacques-René Hébert during the French Revolution, founder of Le Père Duchesne, was reborn. Multiple newspaper titles were published during the Commune that referenced the legacy of Hébert or of 1793; such as "Le Pair du Chêne, Le Testament du Père Duchêne, Le Vrai Duchêne, Je suis le véritable Père Duchêne, Foutre!, followed by Les Mémoires du Père Duchêne, Duchêne réactionnaire [...] and, more simply, Le Fils Duchêne, La Tante Duchêne, La Mère Duchêne".

=== Le Fils du Père Duchêne ===
In this context, Le Fils du Père Duchêne was founded on 20 April 1871, by Maxime Vuillaume and Eugène Vermersch. Comprising a total of ten issues, running from 20 April until the end of the Commune, and even depicting the Semaine sanglante in its final issue, it distinguished itself by using the Republican calendar of the French Revolution, for instance, by publishing in Floréal.

The newspaper quickly became an important publication for caricatures, an art form that flourished during the Commune. It employed a good portion of the 80 to 100 caricaturists then living in Paris, most of whom were Communards.

Le Fils du Père Duchêne illustré was one of the Commune's longest-running publications. It took stances on political issues affecting the Commune, for example, defending Jarosław Dąbrowski, general of the Communard forces. It wrote about him in the caption of the related caricature, calling him "a good fellow!" It was also polemical towards Adolphe Thiers, the leader of the 'Versaillais', calling him a "dictator" and depicting him riding a snail.

== Legacy ==
=== Material culture ===
The original copies of the newspaper are relatively rare, like other newspapers from the period. The Heidelberg University, among others, holds copies.

=== Studies ===
In 2021, during a symposium organized for the 150th anniversary of the Paris Commune, historian Samy Lagrange studied the representations of masculinity in the newspaper, comparing them to those Émile Zola made in his discourses. He showed that the newspaper portrayed an insurrectionary masculinity, whereas Zola acted differently.

== Bibliography ==
- Eichner, Carolyn Jeanne (2022). The Paris Commune: A Brief History (Reinventions of the Paris Commune). Rutgers University Press. ISBN 978-1-9788-2768-4.

== Issues ==
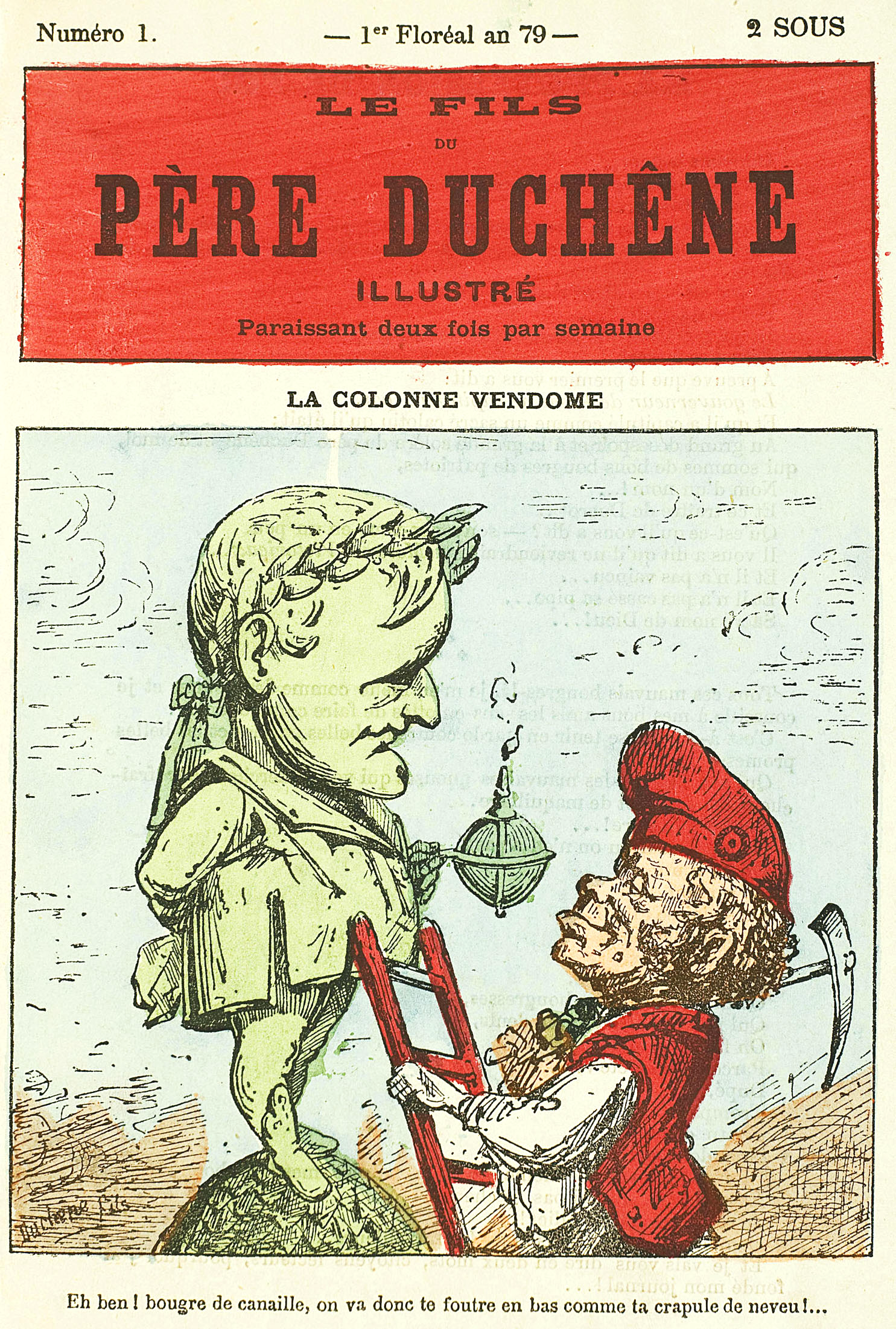
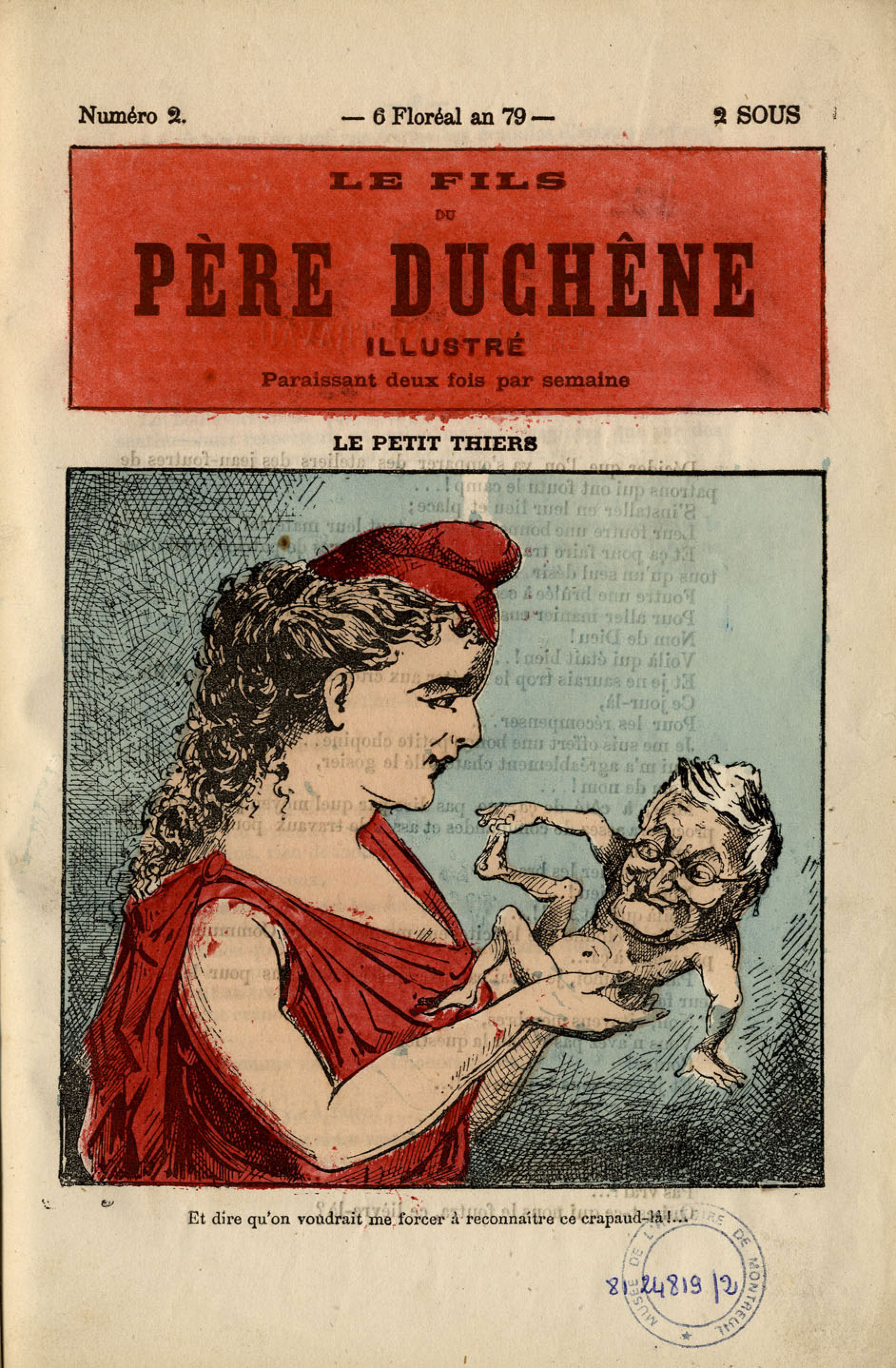
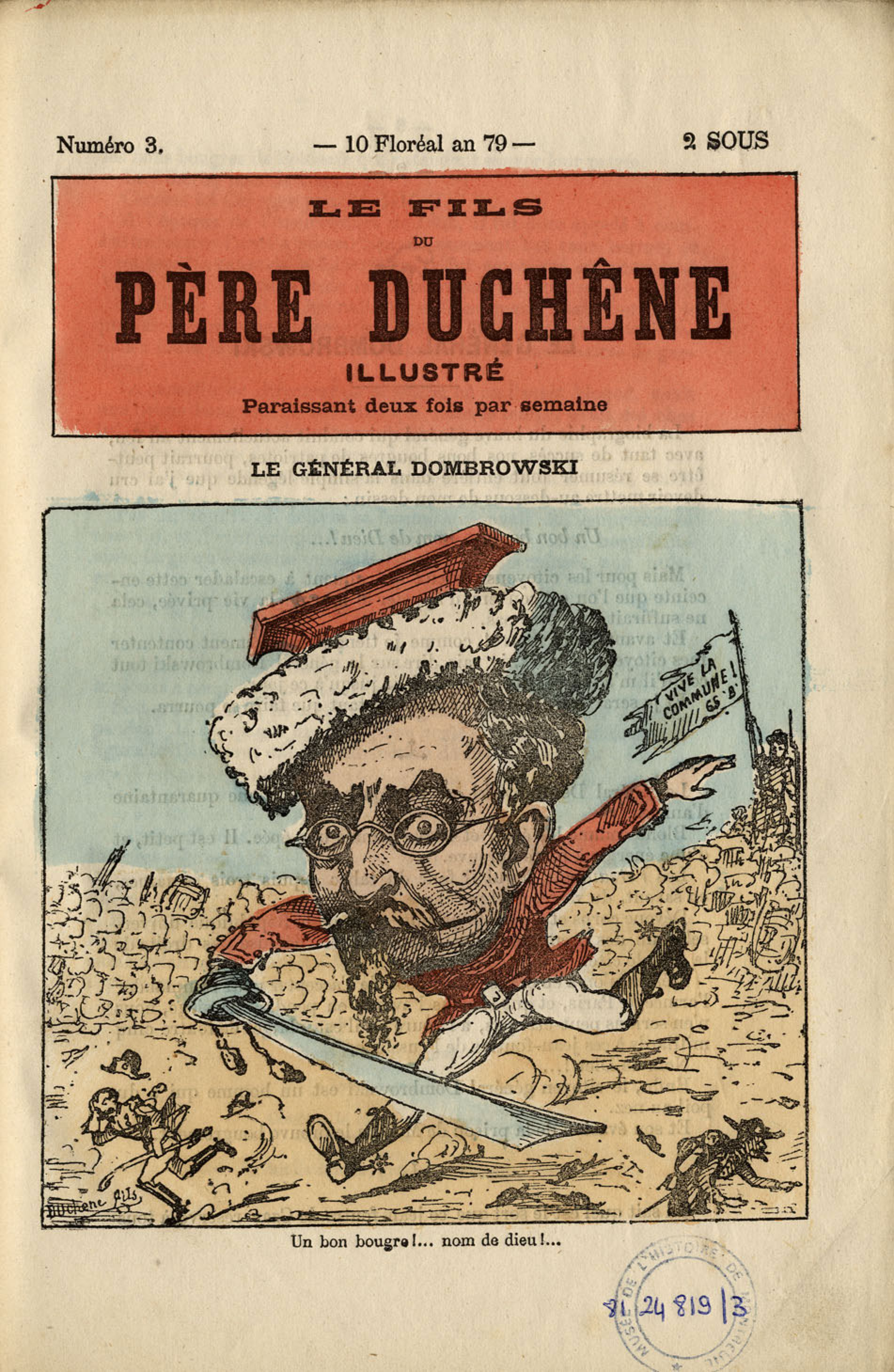
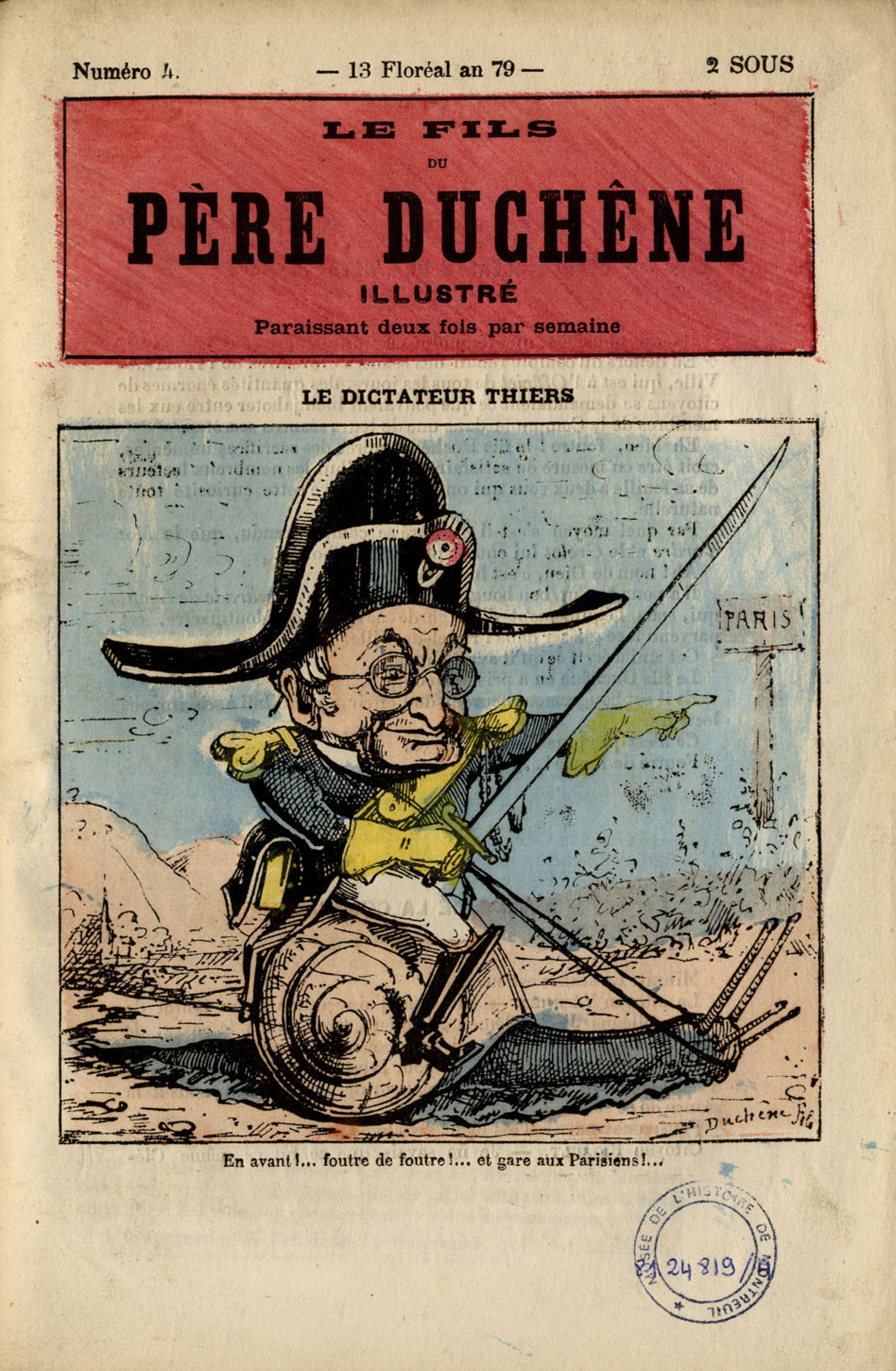
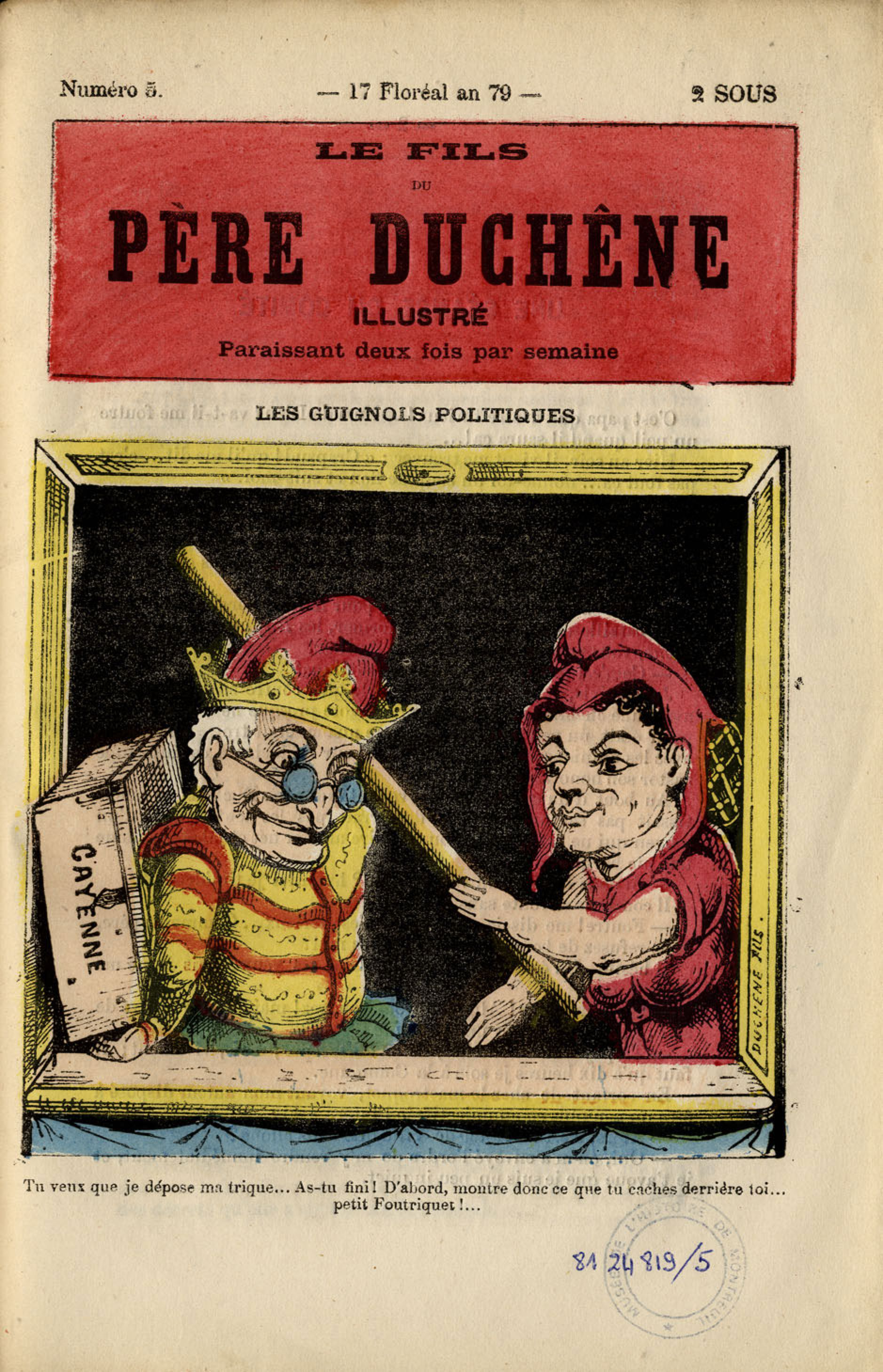
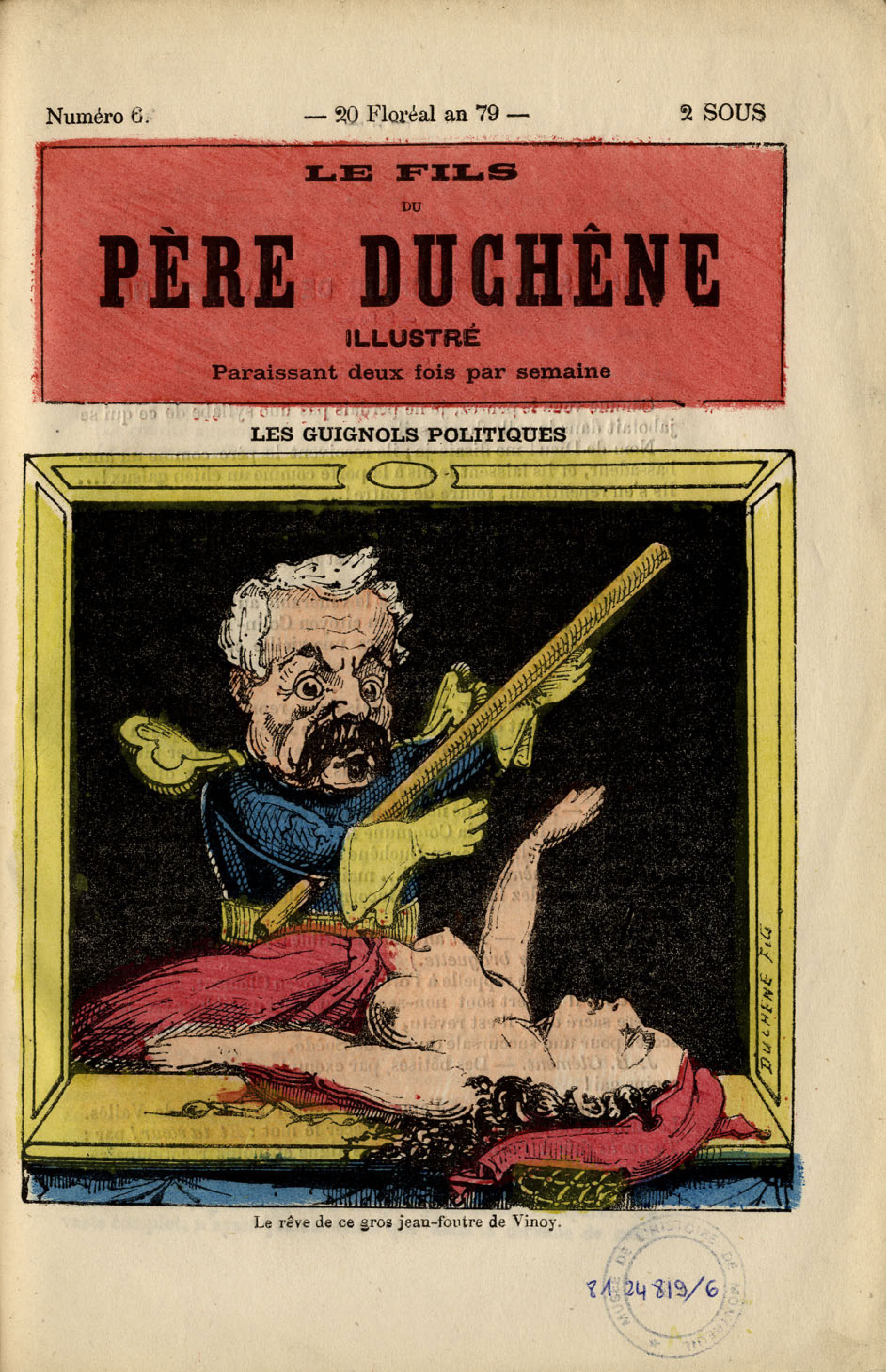
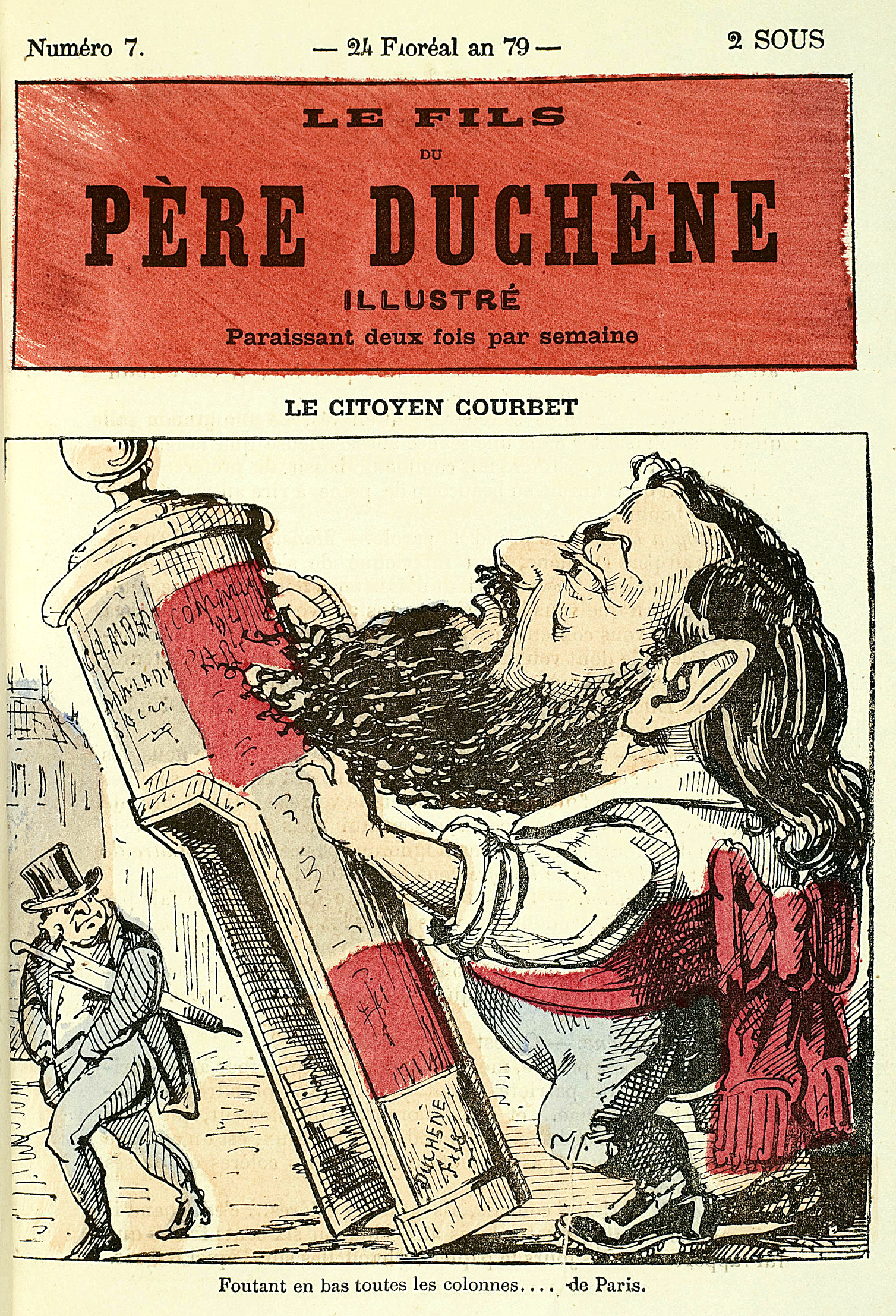
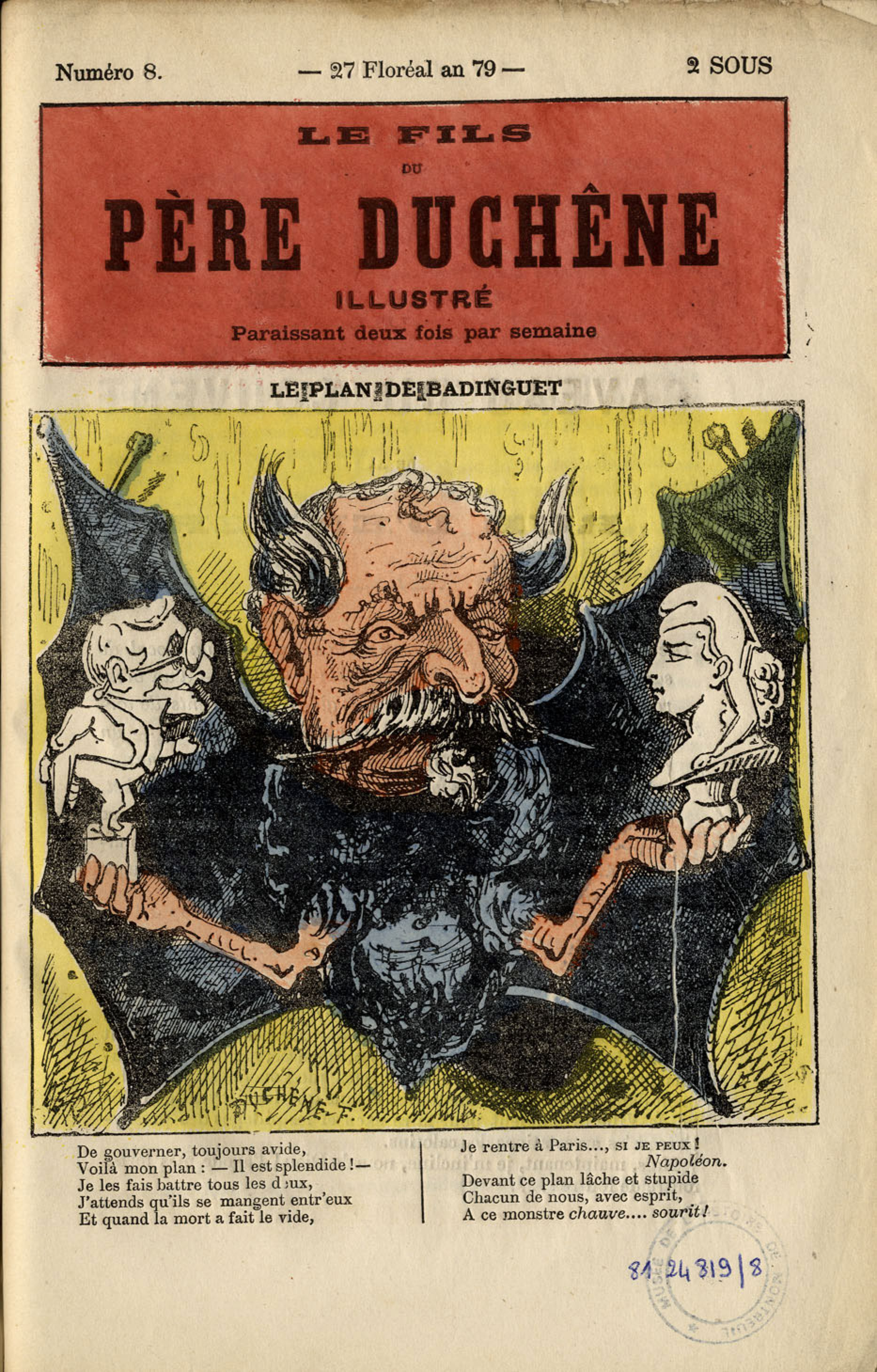
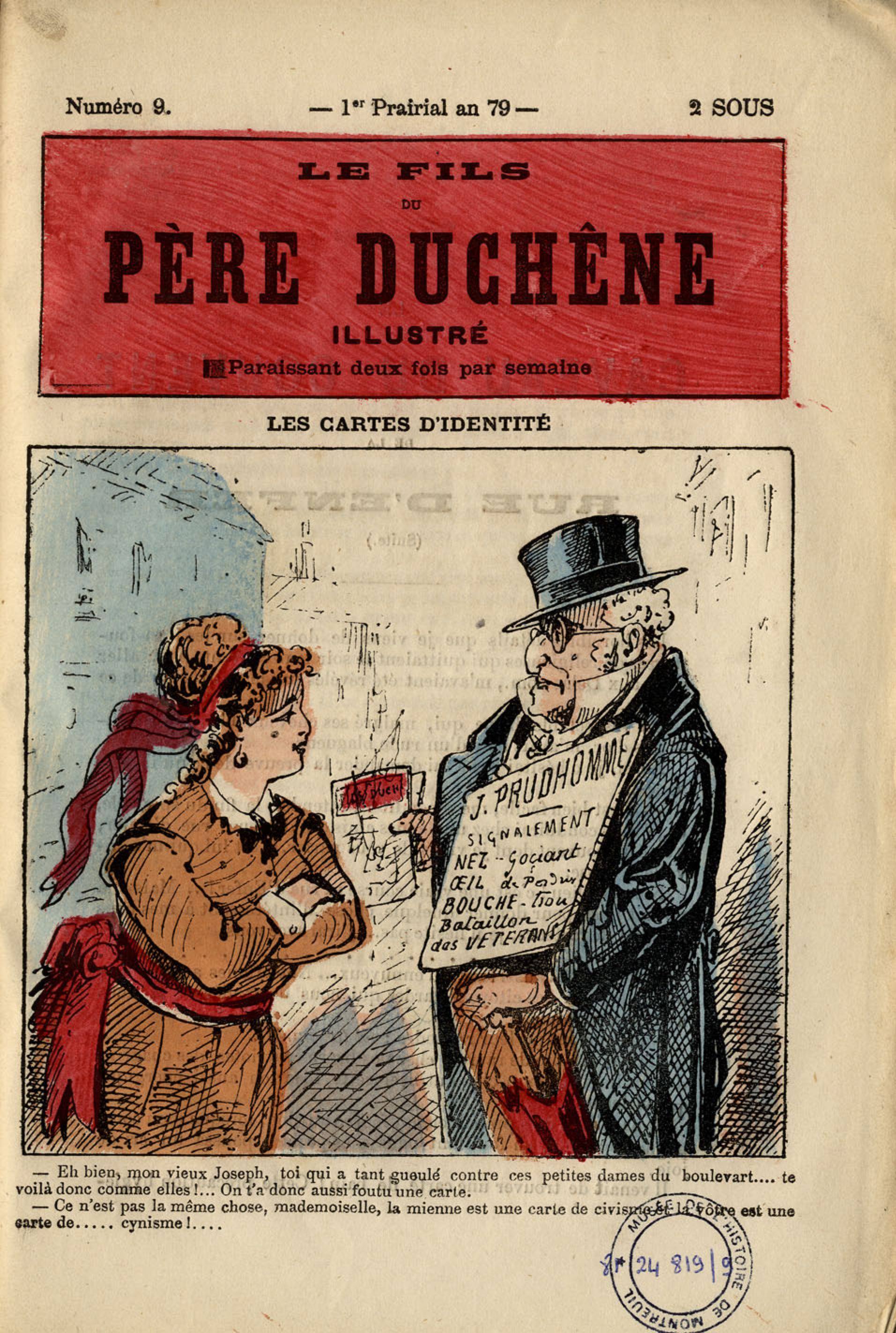
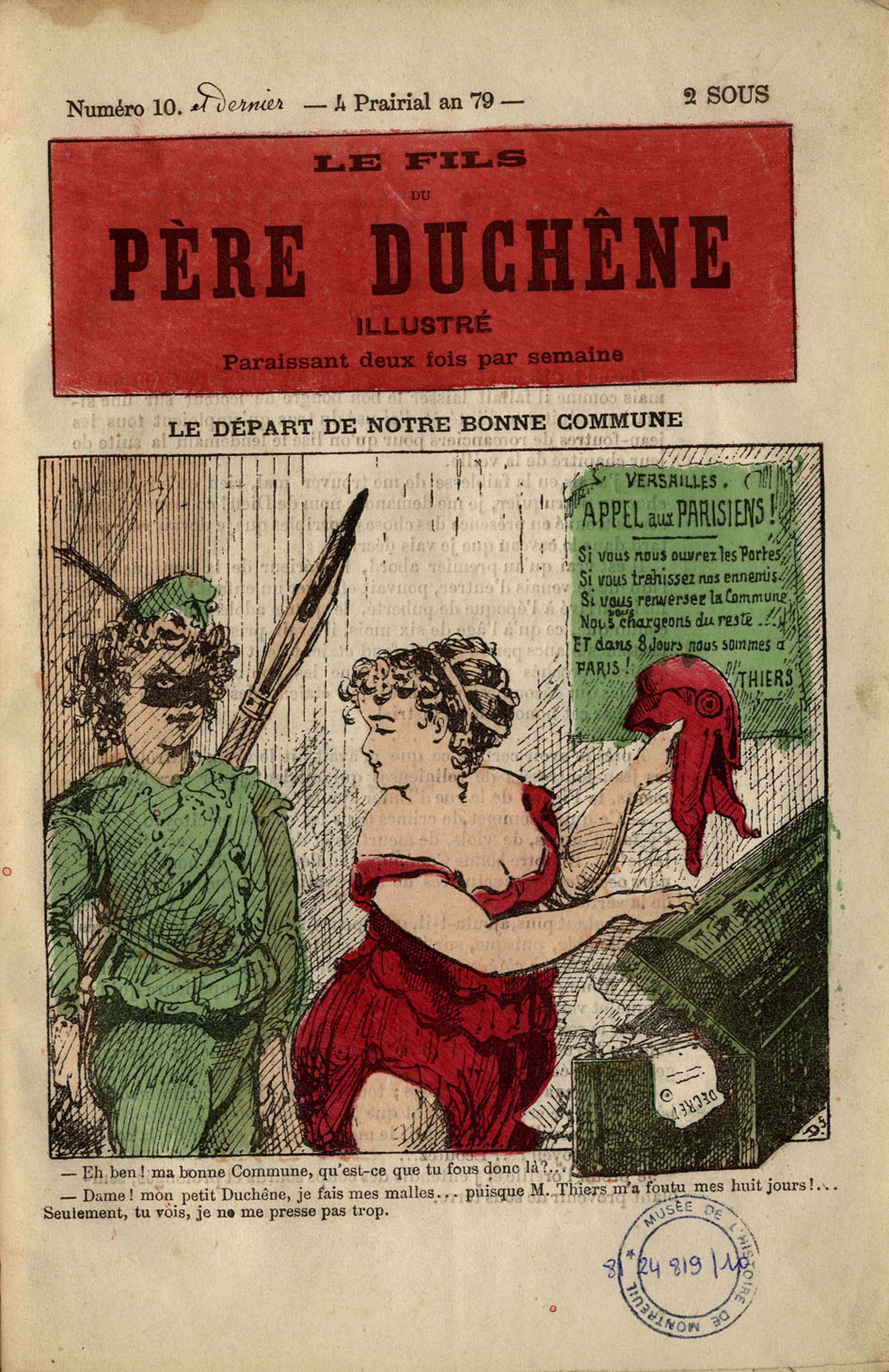
N°	Republican Date	Gregorian Date	Title	Description	Legend
	1 Floréal 79	21 April 1871	The Vendôme Column	Père Duchesne facing the statue of Napoléon Bonaparte at the top of the Vendôme Column	Sooo! you dirty bugger, you're gonna get screwed down there like that scumbag nephew of yours [i.e.: Napoleon III of France]!...
	6 Floréal 79	26 April 1871	Little Thiers	The Commune [tr. note: personified as the French national symbol, Marianne] holding Thiers in the form of a sickly newborn	And to think anyone would want to force me to recognize that son of a bitch!...
	10 Floréal 79	30 April 1871	General Dombrowski (Jarosław Dąbrowski)	Dombrowski, saber in hand, routing the people of Versailles	A good guy!... God!...
	13 Floréal 79	3 May 1871	The dictator Thiers	Thiers mounted on a snail on the way to Paris	Forward!.. fuck of a fuck!...and watch out for Parisians!...
	17 Floréal 79	7 May 1871	Political puppets	The Commune [Marianne] and Thiers hiding a trunk labeled Cayenne [reference to the Prison of Cayenne] (as puppets)	You expect me to put down my stick ... Have you finished ! First, show me what you're hiding behind your back, little fella!.... [pun on Foutriquet, sobriquet for Thiers ]
	20 Floréal 79	10 May 1871	Political puppets	General Vinoy brandishing his big stick over the Commune [Marianne] lying on the ground, breasts bared (as puppets)	The dream of that big jackass, Vinoy.
	24 Floréal 79	14 May 1871	Citizen Courbet	Gustave Courbet bowling over a Rambuteau column	Knocking down all the columns... of Paris
	27 Floréal 79	17 May 1871	The dream of Badinguet (Napoleon III)	Napoléon III as a bat, comparing the weights of Thiers and of the Republic	For governing, always rabid, Here's my plan: - it's splendid! - I will make both of them fight each other, I am waiting for them to eat each other And when Death has emptied it I will return to Paris..., if I WANT TO ! Napoleon III. Before this cowardly and stupid plan Each of us, with gusto, To this bald monster...smile! [tr.: pun on bat]
	1 Prairial 79	21 May 1871	Identity cards	A young woman facing Mr. Prudhomme (a bourgeois type) [tr.: "prudent man"], who has the newspaper Le père Duchêne in his hand, wearing a sign around his neck reading : J. PRUDHOMME; Description; Nose ... ey Parker [tr: actually a similar French pun for "nose" and "merchant"] Eyes ... of a partridge Mouth ... shut [tr: similar French pun for "mouth" and "stop-gap"] Veterans battalion.	Well, my dear Joseph, you've bitched so much about those little boulevard-women, and here you are then, just like them!... They've wasted a card on you too.; It's not the same thing, miss, mine is a civic-minded ("civisme") card and yours is a cynical card ("cynisme")!...
	4 Prairial 79	24 May 1871	Departure from our good ol' Commune	The Son of Duchesne, dressed as a Fédéré, with the Commune (as Marianne) who is packing her suitcase. (During la semaine sanglante)	Well! My dear Commune, what is it you're screwin' around with there?...; Holy Mother! My cute little Duchêne, I'm packing my trunks...since Mr. Thiers has been screwing me for the past eight days. Only, as you see, I'm not hurrying too much.
