= Floréal =

8th month in the French Republican calendar

Floréal (French pronunciation: [flɔʁeal]) was the eighth month in the French Republican calendar. The month was named after the Latin word flos 'flower'.

Floréal was the second month of the spring quarter (mois de printemps). It started 20 April or 21 April. It ended 19 May or 20 May. It follows Germinal and precedes Prairial.

Year: 3
Month: Floréal
Year: III

Day of the 10-day
week (décade)
Primidi
Duodi
Tridi
Quartidi
Quintidi
Sextidi
Septidi
Octidi
Nonidi
Décadi

décade 22
1	Monday; 20 April 1795
2	Tuesday; 21 April 1795
3	Wednesday; 22 April 1795
4	Thursday; 23 April 1795
5	Friday; 24 April 1795
6	Saturday; 25 April 1795
7	Sunday; 26 April 1795
8	Monday; 27 April 1795
9	Tuesday; 28 April 1795
10	Wednesday; 29 April 1795

décade 23
11	Thursday; 30 April 1795
12	Friday; 1 May 1795
13	Saturday; 2 May 1795
14	Sunday; 3 May 1795
15	Monday; 4 May 1795
16	Tuesday; 5 May 1795
17	Wednesday; 6 May 1795
18	Thursday; 7 May 1795
19	Friday; 8 May 1795
20	Saturday; 9 May 1795

décade 24
21	Sunday; 10 May 1795
22	Monday; 11 May 1795
23	Tuesday; 12 May 1795
24	Wednesday; 13 May 1795
25	Thursday; 14 May 1795
26	Friday; 15 May 1795
27	Saturday; 16 May 1795
28	Sunday; 17 May 1795
29	Monday; 18 May 1795
30	Tuesday; 19 May 1795

Decimal time – 10 h/day
Paris
3h20m83s

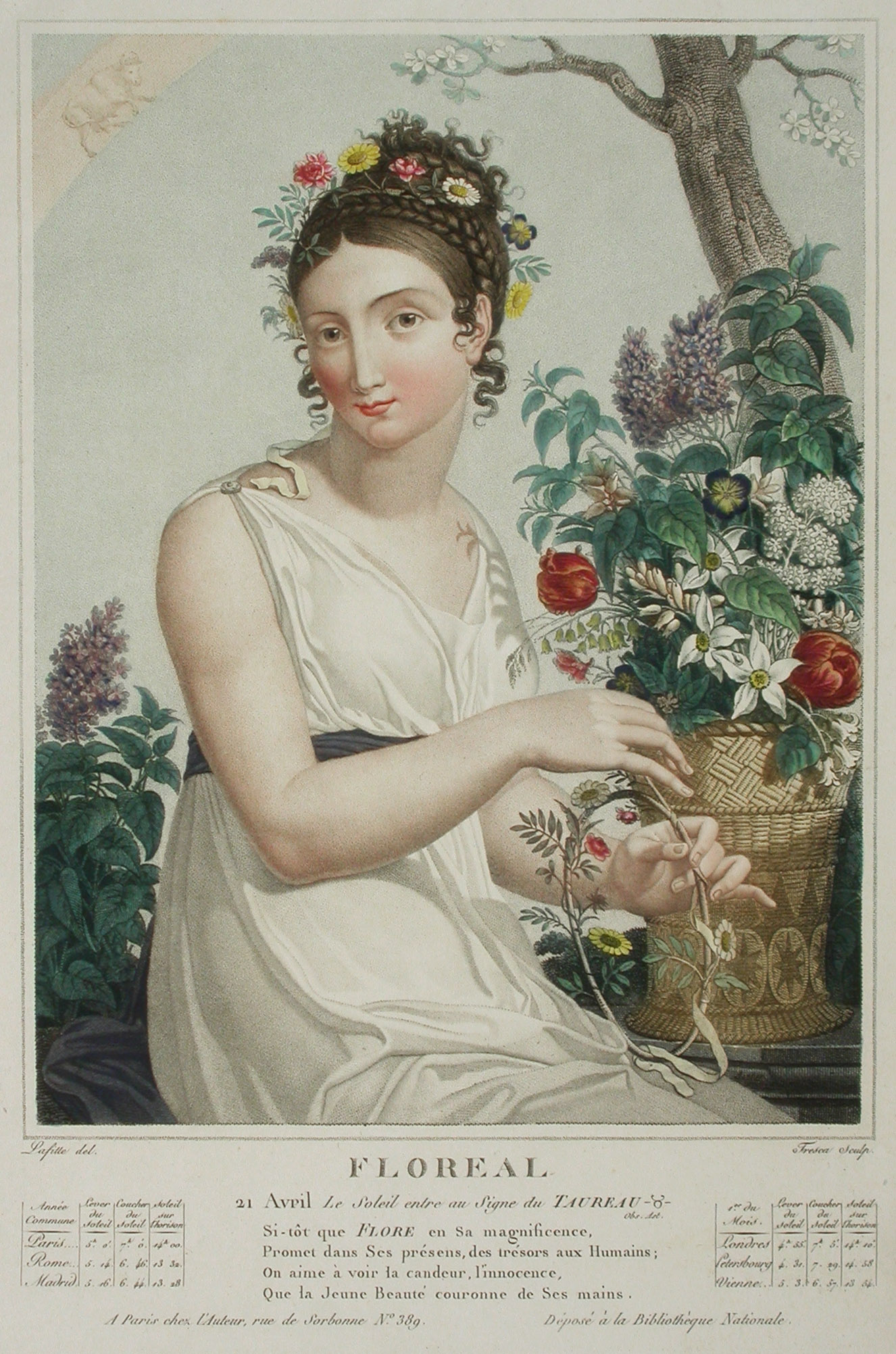
Floréal

07:32:39
Time of day - 24 h/day
Greenwich

Conversion between Republican and Gregorian calendar for the years I - XIV

Year: 1
Month: Floréal
Year: I

Day of the 10-day
week (décade)
Primidi
Duodi
Tridi
Quartidi
Quintidi
Sextidi
Septidi
Octidi
Nonidi
Décadi

décade 22
1	Saturday; 20 April 1793
2	Sunday; 21 April 1793
3	Monday; 22 April 1793
4	Tuesday; 23 April 1793
5	Wednesday; 24 April 1793
6	Thursday; 25 April 1793
7	Friday; 26 April 1793
8	Saturday; 27 April 1793
9	Sunday; 28 April 1793
10	Monday; 29 April 1793

décade 23
11	Tuesday; 30 April 1793
12	Wednesday; 1 May 1793
13	Thursday; 2 May 1793
14	Friday; 3 May 1793
15	Saturday; 4 May 1793
16	Sunday; 5 May 1793
17	Monday; 6 May 1793
18	Tuesday; 7 May 1793
19	Wednesday; 8 May 1793
20	Thursday; 9 May 1793

décade 24
21	Friday; 10 May 1793
22	Saturday; 11 May 1793
23	Sunday; 12 May 1793
24	Monday; 13 May 1793
25	Tuesday; 14 May 1793
26	Wednesday; 15 May 1793
27	Thursday; 16 May 1793
28	Friday; 17 May 1793
29	Saturday; 18 May 1793
30	Sunday; 19 May 1793

Decimal time – 10 h/day
Paris
3:14:34

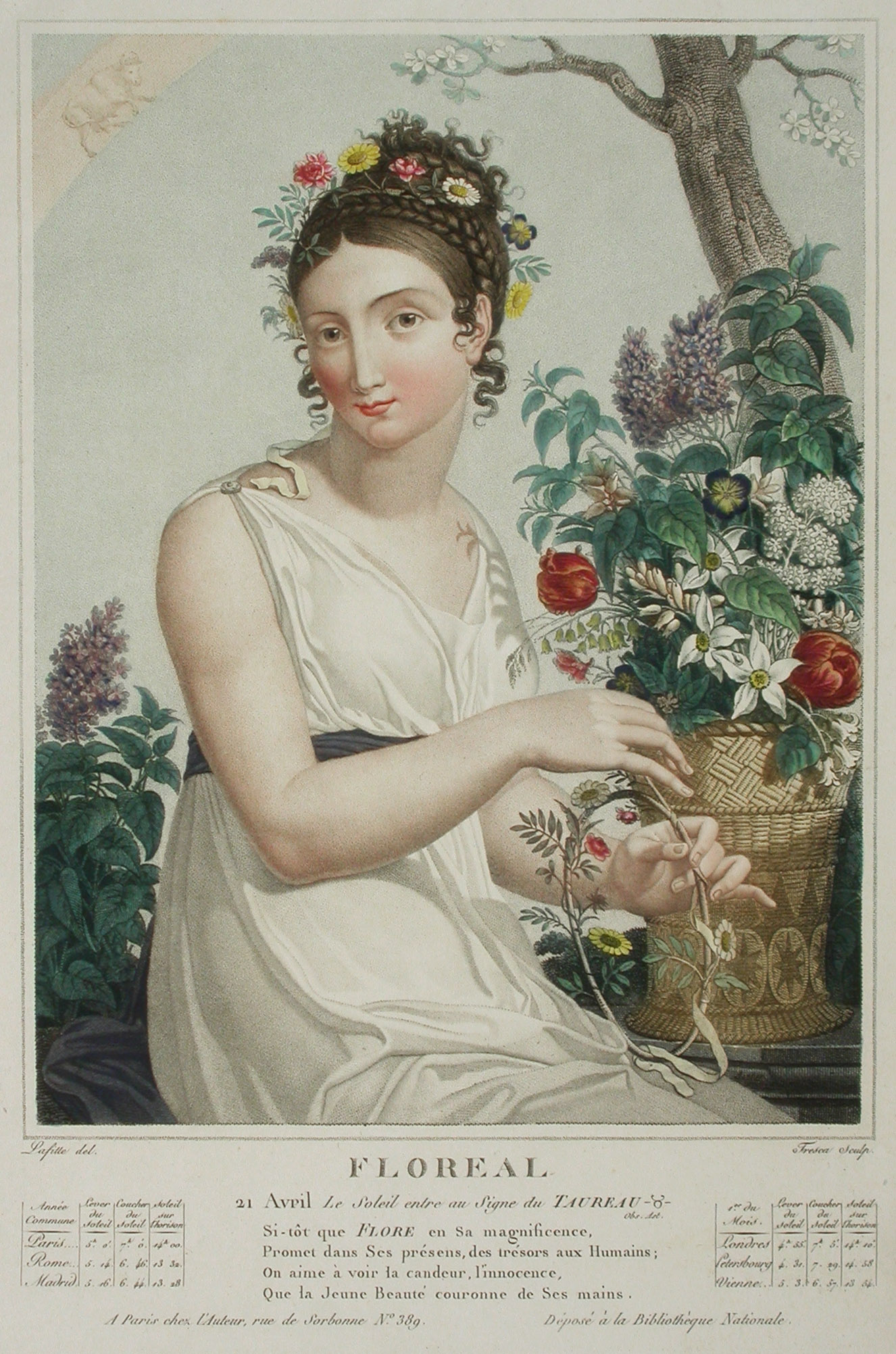
Floréal

07:32:39
Time of day - 24 h/day
Greenwich

Year: 2
Month: Floréal
Year: II

Day of the 10-day
week (décade)
Primidi
Duodi
Tridi
Quartidi
Quintidi
Sextidi
Septidi
Octidi
Nonidi
Décadi

décade 22
1	Sunday; 20 April 1794
2	Monday; 21 April 1794
3	Tuesday; 22 April 1794
4	Wednesday; 23 April 1794
5	Thursday; 24 April 1794
6	Friday; 25 April 1794
7	Saturday; 26 April 1794
8	Sunday; 27 April 1794
9	Monday; 28 April 1794
10	Tuesday; 29 April 1794

décade 23
11	Wednesday; 30 April 1794
12	Thursday; 1 May 1794
13	Friday; 2 May 1794
14	Saturday; 3 May 1794
15	Sunday; 4 May 1794
16	Monday; 5 May 1794
17	Tuesday; 6 May 1794
18	Wednesday; 7 May 1794
19	Thursday; 8 May 1794
20	Friday; 9 May 1794

décade 24
21	Saturday; 10 May 1794
22	Sunday; 11 May 1794
23	Monday; 12 May 1794
24	Tuesday; 13 May 1794
25	Wednesday; 14 May 1794
26	Thursday; 15 May 1794
27	Friday; 16 May 1794
28	Saturday; 17 May 1794
29	Sunday; 18 May 1794
30	Monday; 19 May 1794

Decimal time – 10 h/day
Paris
3:14:34

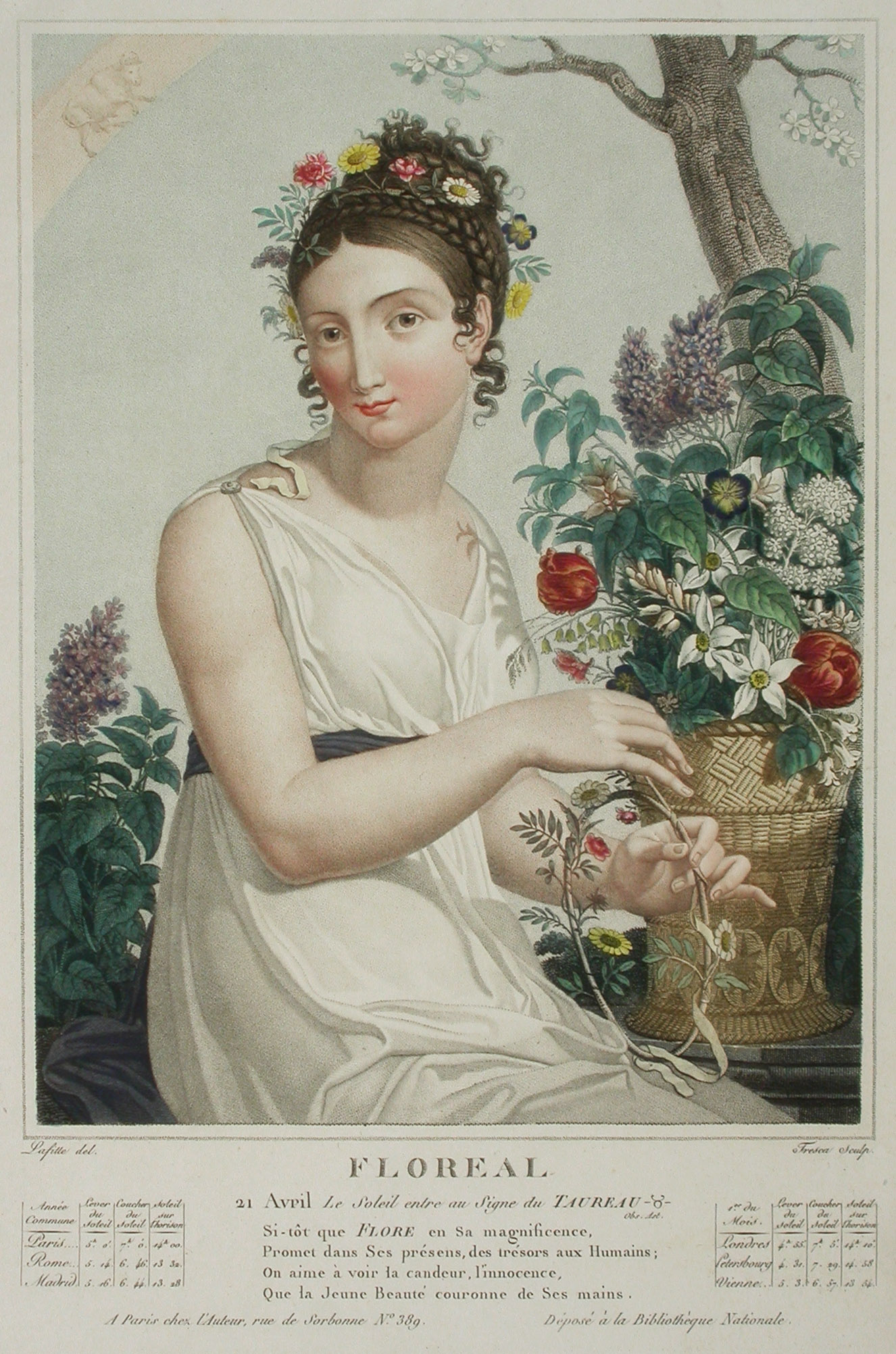
Floréal

07:32:39
Time of day - 24 h/day
Greenwich

Year: 3
Month: Floréal
Year: III

Day of the 10-day
week (décade)
Primidi
Duodi
Tridi
Quartidi
Quintidi
Sextidi
Septidi
Octidi
Nonidi
Décadi

décade 22
1	Monday; 20 April 1795
2	Tuesday; 21 April 1795
3	Wednesday; 22 April 1795
4	Thursday; 23 April 1795
5	Friday; 24 April 1795
6	Saturday; 25 April 1795
7	Sunday; 26 April 1795
8	Monday; 27 April 1795
9	Tuesday; 28 April 1795
10	Wednesday; 29 April 1795

décade 23
11	Thursday; 30 April 1795
12	Friday; 1 May 1795
13	Saturday; 2 May 1795
14	Sunday; 3 May 1795
15	Monday; 4 May 1795
16	Tuesday; 5 May 1795
17	Wednesday; 6 May 1795
18	Thursday; 7 May 1795
19	Friday; 8 May 1795
20	Saturday; 9 May 1795

décade 24
21	Sunday; 10 May 1795
22	Monday; 11 May 1795
23	Tuesday; 12 May 1795
24	Wednesday; 13 May 1795
25	Thursday; 14 May 1795
26	Friday; 15 May 1795
27	Saturday; 16 May 1795
28	Sunday; 17 May 1795
29	Monday; 18 May 1795
30	Tuesday; 19 May 1795

Decimal time – 10 h/day
Paris
3:14:34

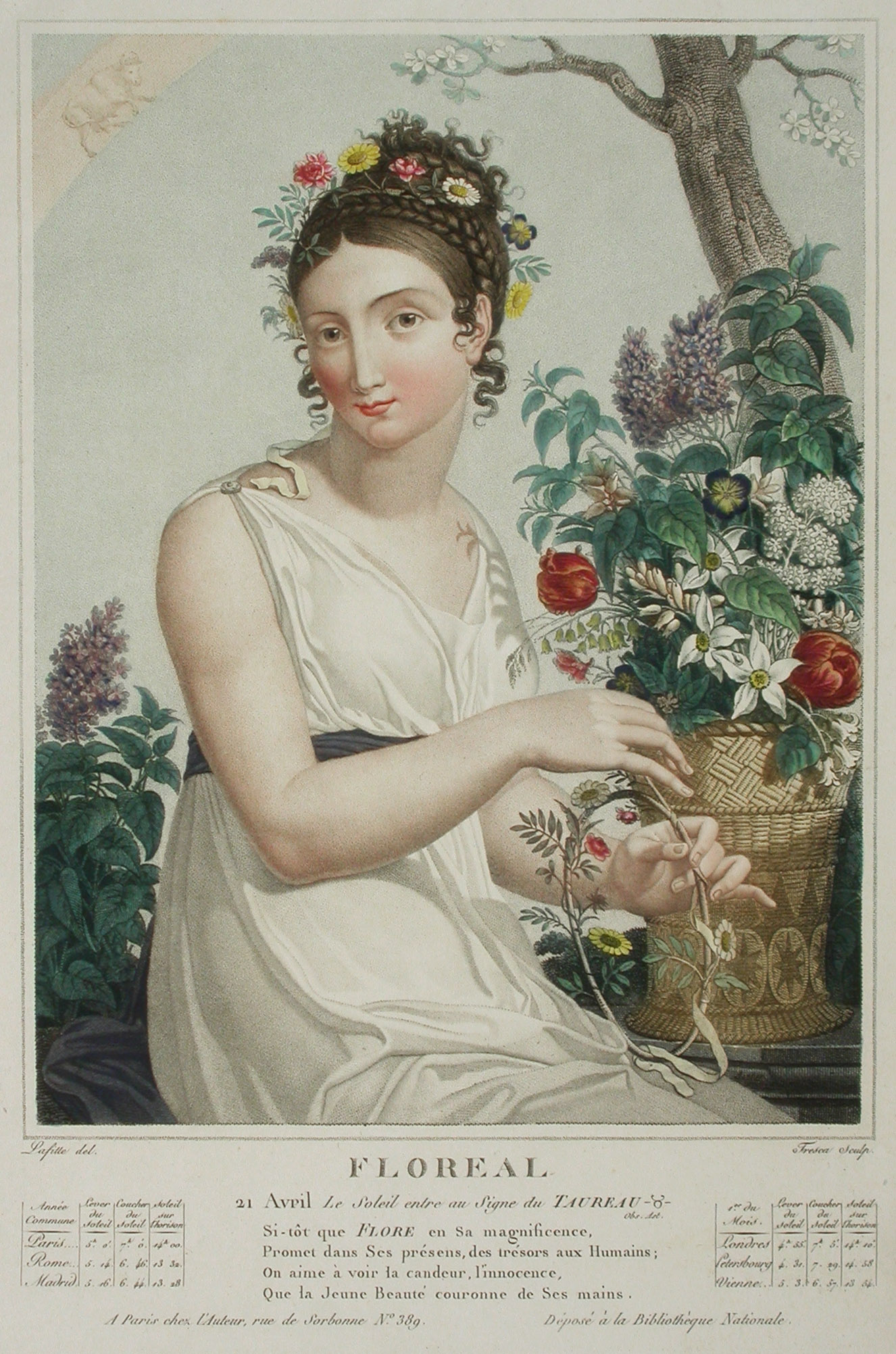
Floréal

07:32:39
Time of day - 24 h/day
Greenwich

Year: 4
Month: Floréal
Year: IV

Day of the 10-day
week (décade)
Primidi
Duodi
Tridi
Quartidi
Quintidi
Sextidi
Septidi
Octidi
Nonidi
Décadi

décade 22
1	Wednesday; 20 April 1796
2	Thursday; 21 April 1796
3	Friday; 22 April 1796
4	Saturday; 23 April 1796
5	Sunday; 24 April 1796
6	Monday; 25 April 1796
7	Tuesday; 26 April 1796
8	Wednesday; 27 April 1796
9	Thursday; 28 April 1796
10	Friday; 29 April 1796

décade 23
11	Saturday; 30 April 1796
12	Sunday; 1 May 1796
13	Monday; 2 May 1796
14	Tuesday; 3 May 1796
15	Wednesday; 4 May 1796
16	Thursday; 5 May 1796
17	Friday; 6 May 1796
18	Saturday; 7 May 1796
19	Sunday; 8 May 1796
20	Monday; 9 May 1796

décade 24
21	Tuesday; 10 May 1796
22	Wednesday; 11 May 1796
23	Thursday; 12 May 1796
24	Friday; 13 May 1796
25	Saturday; 14 May 1796
26	Sunday; 15 May 1796
27	Monday; 16 May 1796
28	Tuesday; 17 May 1796
29	Wednesday; 18 May 1796
30	Thursday; 19 May 1796

Decimal time – 10 h/day
Paris
3:14:34

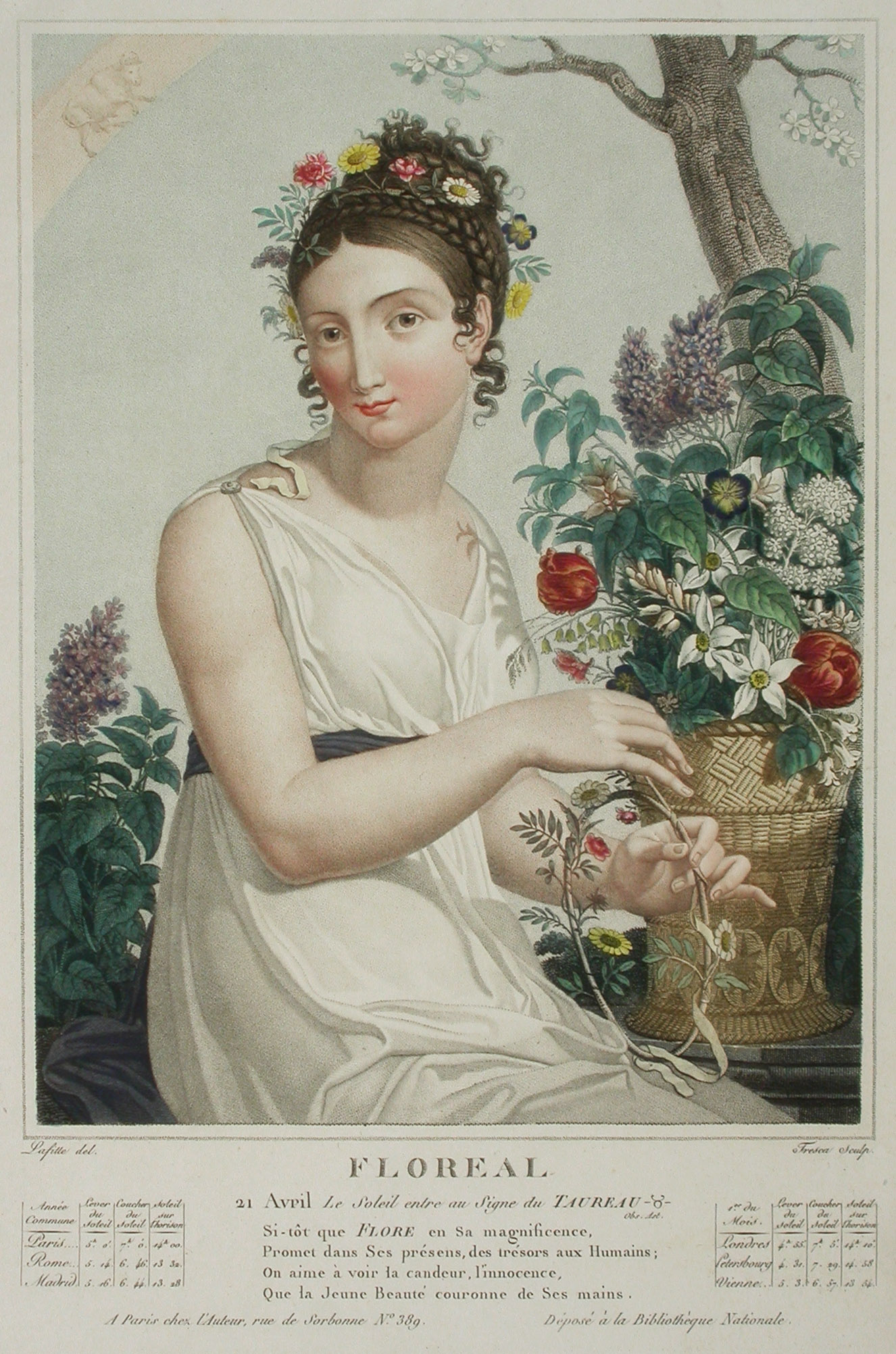
Floréal

07:32:39
Time of day - 24 h/day
Greenwich

Year: 5
Month: Floréal
Year: V

Day of the 10-day
week (décade)
Primidi
Duodi
Tridi
Quartidi
Quintidi
Sextidi
Septidi
Octidi
Nonidi
Décadi

décade 22
1	Thursday; 20 April 1797
2	Friday; 21 April 1797
3	Saturday; 22 April 1797
4	Sunday; 23 April 1797
5	Monday; 24 April 1797
6	Tuesday; 25 April 1797
7	Wednesday; 26 April 1797
8	Thursday; 27 April 1797
9	Friday; 28 April 1797
10	Saturday; 29 April 1797

décade 23
11	Sunday; 30 April 1797
12	Monday; 1 May 1797
13	Tuesday; 2 May 1797
14	Wednesday; 3 May 1797
15	Thursday; 4 May 1797
16	Friday; 5 May 1797
17	Saturday; 6 May 1797
18	Sunday; 7 May 1797
19	Monday; 8 May 1797
20	Tuesday; 9 May 1797

décade 24
21	Wednesday; 10 May 1797
22	Thursday; 11 May 1797
23	Friday; 12 May 1797
24	Saturday; 13 May 1797
25	Sunday; 14 May 1797
26	Monday; 15 May 1797
27	Tuesday; 16 May 1797
28	Wednesday; 17 May 1797
29	Thursday; 18 May 1797
30	Friday; 19 May 1797

Decimal time – 10 h/day
Paris
3:14:34

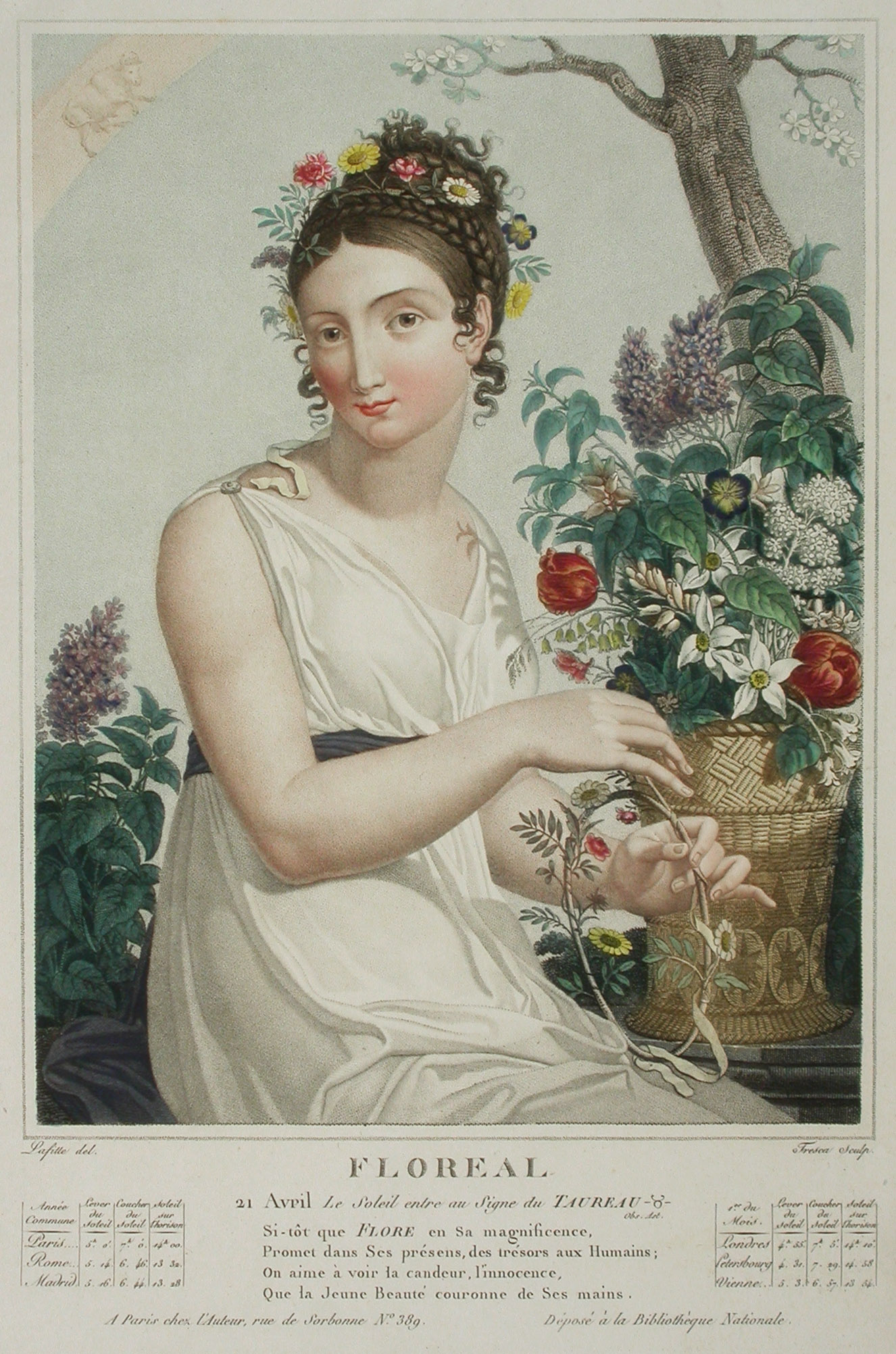
Floréal

07:32:39
Time of day - 24 h/day
Greenwich

Year: 6
Month: Floréal
Year: VI

Day of the 10-day
week (décade)
Primidi
Duodi
Tridi
Quartidi
Quintidi
Sextidi
Septidi
Octidi
Nonidi
Décadi

décade 22
1	Friday; 20 April 1798
2	Saturday; 21 April 1798
3	Sunday; 22 April 1798
4	Monday; 23 April 1798
5	Tuesday; 24 April 1798
6	Wednesday; 25 April 1798
7	Thursday; 26 April 1798
8	Friday; 27 April 1798
9	Saturday; 28 April 1798
10	Sunday; 29 April 1798

décade 23
11	Monday; 30 April 1798
12	Tuesday; 1 May 1798
13	Wednesday; 2 May 1798
14	Thursday; 3 May 1798
15	Friday; 4 May 1798
16	Saturday; 5 May 1798
17	Sunday; 6 May 1798
18	Monday; 7 May 1798
19	Tuesday; 8 May 1798
20	Wednesday; 9 May 1798

décade 24
21	Thursday; 10 May 1798
22	Friday; 11 May 1798
23	Saturday; 12 May 1798
24	Sunday; 13 May 1798
25	Monday; 14 May 1798
26	Tuesday; 15 May 1798
27	Wednesday; 16 May 1798
28	Thursday; 17 May 1798
29	Friday; 18 May 1798
30	Saturday; 19 May 1798

Decimal time – 10 h/day
Paris
3:14:34

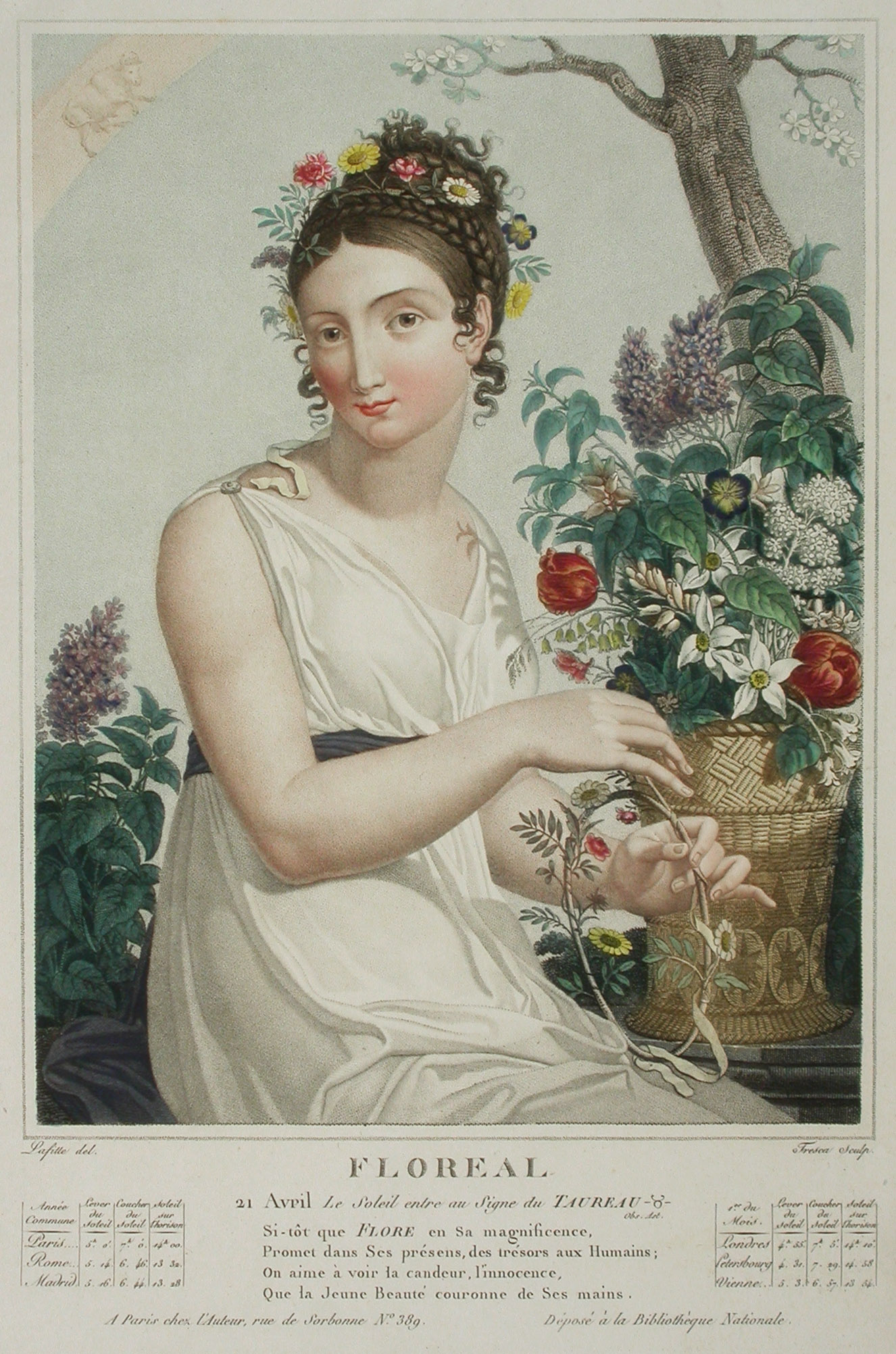
Floréal

07:32:39
Time of day - 24 h/day
Greenwich

Year: 7
Month: Floréal
Year: VII

Day of the 10-day
week (décade)
Primidi
Duodi
Tridi
Quartidi
Quintidi
Sextidi
Septidi
Octidi
Nonidi
Décadi

décade 22
1	Saturday; 20 April 1799
2	Sunday; 21 April 1799
3	Monday; 22 April 1799
4	Tuesday; 23 April 1799
5	Wednesday; 24 April 1799
6	Thursday; 25 April 1799
7	Friday; 26 April 1799
8	Saturday; 27 April 1799
9	Sunday; 28 April 1799
10	Monday; 29 April 1799

décade 23
11	Tuesday; 30 April 1799
12	Wednesday; 1 May 1799
13	Thursday; 2 May 1799
14	Friday; 3 May 1799
15	Saturday; 4 May 1799
16	Sunday; 5 May 1799
17	Monday; 6 May 1799
18	Tuesday; 7 May 1799
19	Wednesday; 8 May 1799
20	Thursday; 9 May 1799

décade 24
21	Friday; 10 May 1799
22	Saturday; 11 May 1799
23	Sunday; 12 May 1799
24	Monday; 13 May 1799
25	Tuesday; 14 May 1799
26	Wednesday; 15 May 1799
27	Thursday; 16 May 1799
28	Friday; 17 May 1799
29	Saturday; 18 May 1799
30	Sunday; 19 May 1799

Decimal time – 10 h/day
Paris
3:14:34

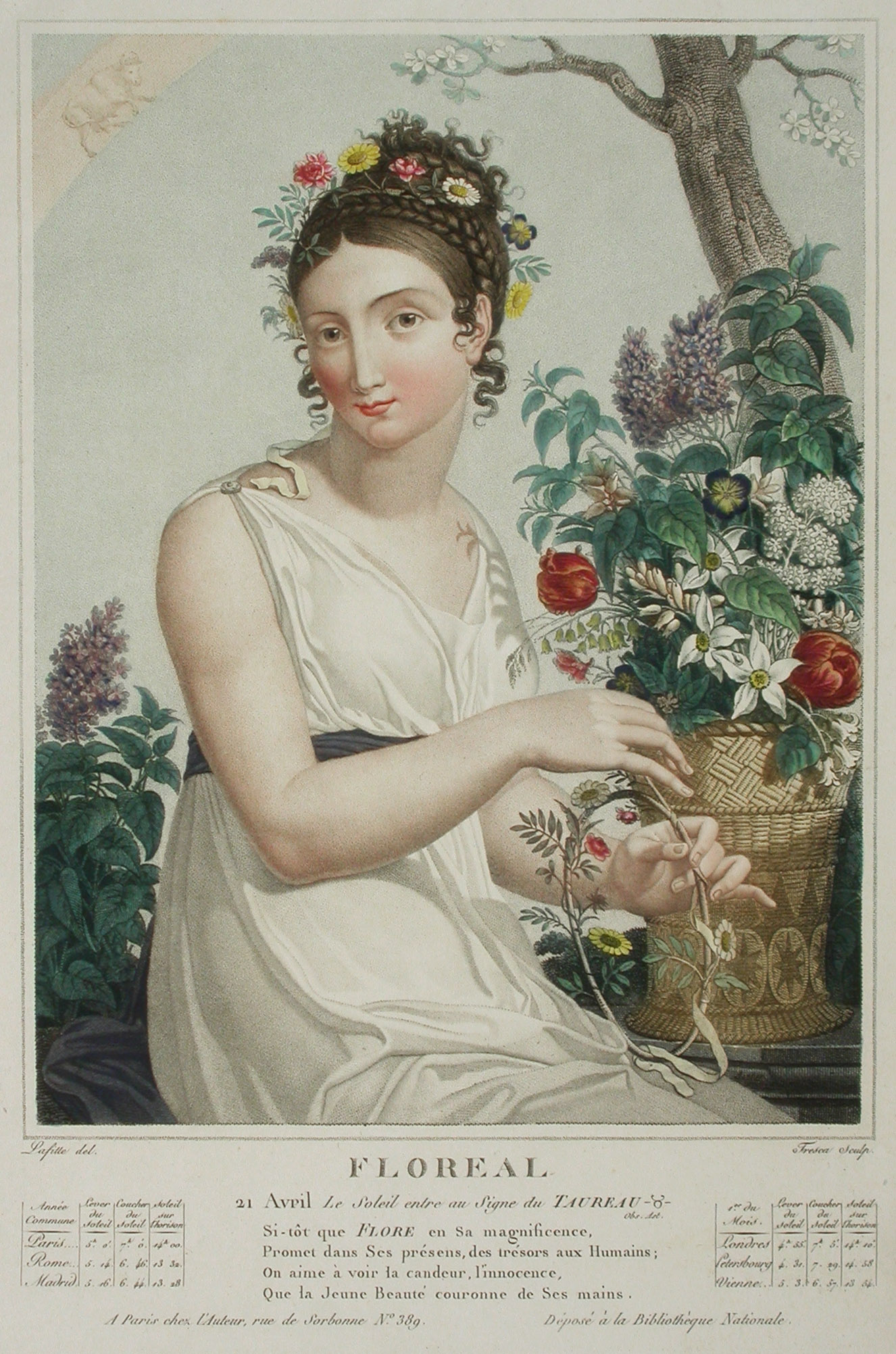
Floréal

07:32:39
Time of day - 24 h/day
Greenwich

Year: 8
Month: Floréal
Year: VIII

Day of the 10-day
week (décade)
Primidi
Duodi
Tridi
Quartidi
Quintidi
Sextidi
Septidi
Octidi
Nonidi
Décadi

décade 22
1	Monday; 21 April 1800
2	Tuesday; 22 April 1800
3	Wednesday; 23 April 1800
4	Thursday; 24 April 1800
5	Friday; 25 April 1800
6	Saturday; 26 April 1800
7	Sunday; 27 April 1800
8	Monday; 28 April 1800
9	Tuesday; 29 April 1800
10	Wednesday; 30 April 1800

décade 23
11	Thursday; 1 May 1800
12	Friday; 2 May 1800
13	Saturday; 3 May 1800
14	Sunday; 4 May 1800
15	Monday; 5 May 1800
16	Tuesday; 6 May 1800
17	Wednesday; 7 May 1800
18	Thursday; 8 May 1800
19	Friday; 9 May 1800
20	Saturday; 10 May 1800

décade 24
21	Sunday; 11 May 1800
22	Monday; 12 May 1800
23	Tuesday; 13 May 1800
24	Wednesday; 14 May 1800
25	Thursday; 15 May 1800
26	Friday; 16 May 1800
27	Saturday; 17 May 1800
28	Sunday; 18 May 1800
29	Monday; 19 May 1800
30	Tuesday; 20 May 1800

Decimal time – 10 h/day
Paris
3:14:34

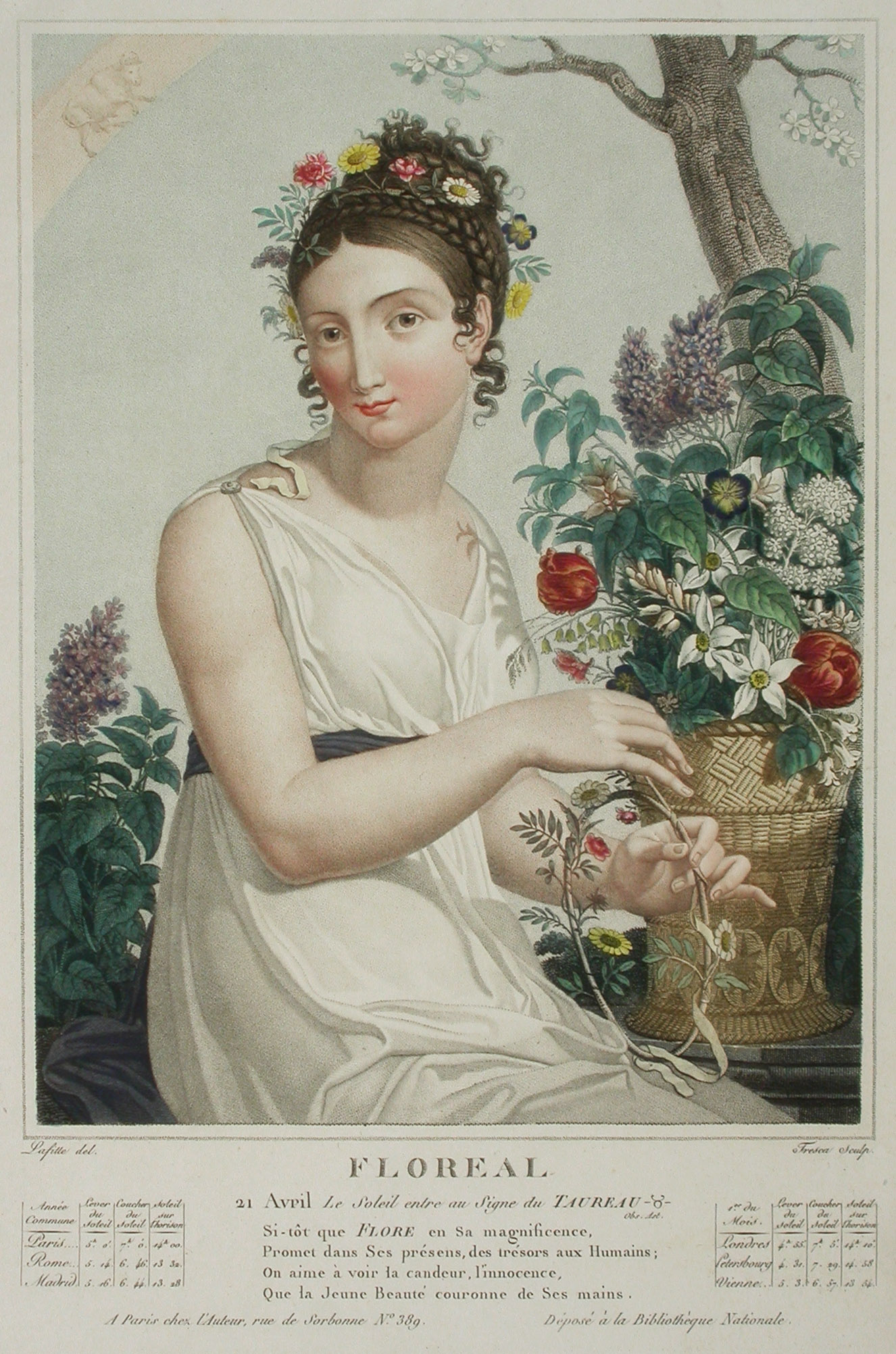
Floréal

07:32:39
Time of day - 24 h/day
Greenwich

Year: 9
Month: Floréal
Year: IX

Day of the 10-day
week (décade)
Primidi
Duodi
Tridi
Quartidi
Quintidi
Sextidi
Septidi
Octidi
Nonidi
Décadi

décade 22
1	Tuesday; 21 April 1801
2	Wednesday; 22 April 1801
3	Thursday; 23 April 1801
4	Friday; 24 April 1801
5	Saturday; 25 April 1801
6	Sunday; 26 April 1801
7	Monday; 27 April 1801
8	Tuesday; 28 April 1801
9	Wednesday; 29 April 1801
10	Thursday; 30 April 1801

décade 23
11	Friday; 1 May 1801
12	Saturday; 2 May 1801
13	Sunday; 3 May 1801
14	Monday; 4 May 1801
15	Tuesday; 5 May 1801
16	Wednesday; 6 May 1801
17	Thursday; 7 May 1801
18	Friday; 8 May 1801
19	Saturday; 9 May 1801
20	Sunday; 10 May 1801

décade 24
21	Monday; 11 May 1801
22	Tuesday; 12 May 1801
23	Wednesday; 13 May 1801
24	Thursday; 14 May 1801
25	Friday; 15 May 1801
26	Saturday; 16 May 1801
27	Sunday; 17 May 1801
28	Monday; 18 May 1801
29	Tuesday; 19 May 1801
30	Wednesday; 20 May 1801

Decimal time – 10 h/day
Paris
3:14:34

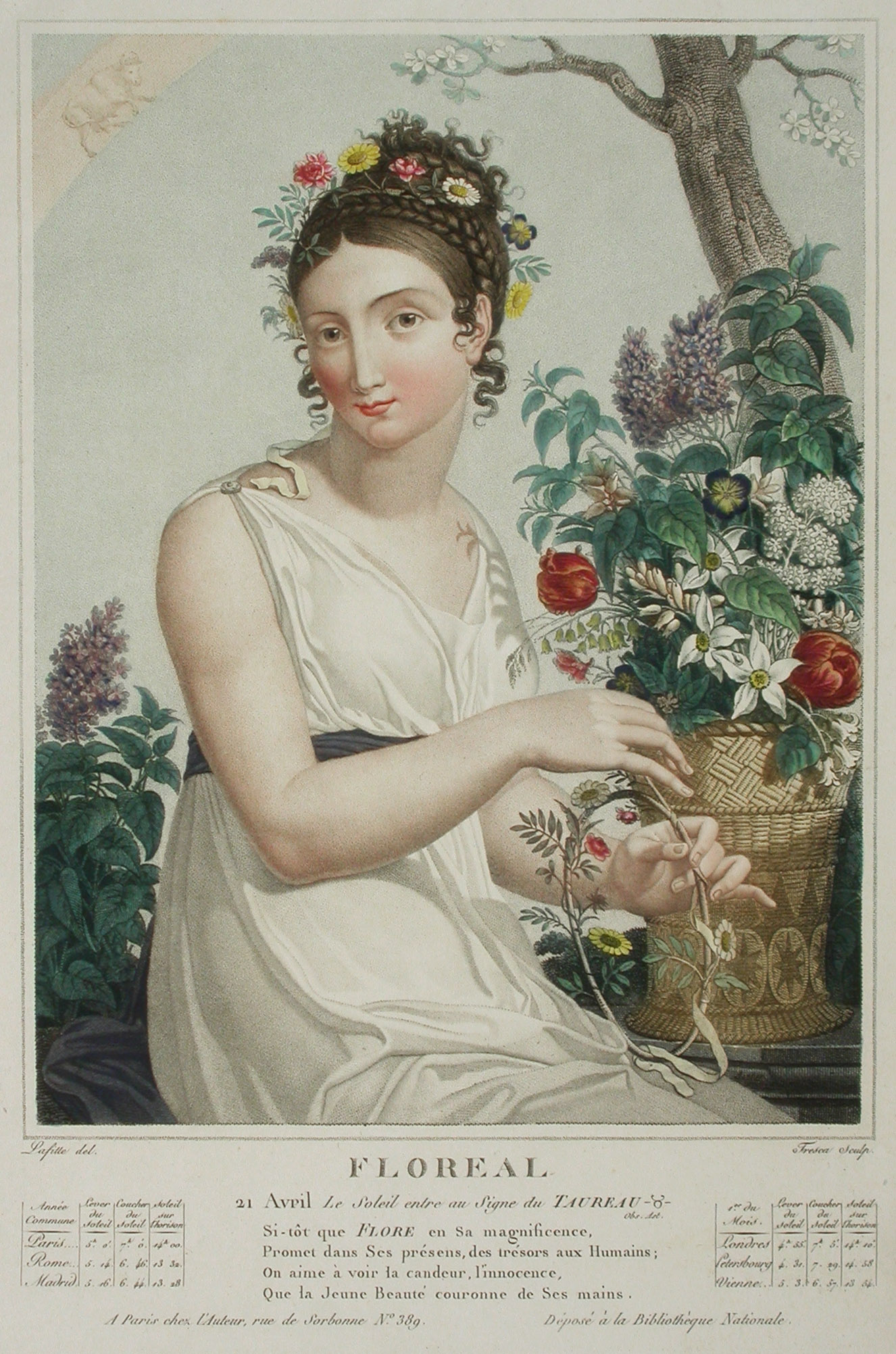
Floréal

07:32:39
Time of day - 24 h/day
Greenwich

Year: 10
Month: Floréal
Year: X

Day of the 10-day
week (décade)
Primidi
Duodi
Tridi
Quartidi
Quintidi
Sextidi
Septidi
Octidi
Nonidi
Décadi

décade 22
1	Wednesday; 21 April 1802
2	Thursday; 22 April 1802
3	Friday; 23 April 1802
4	Saturday; 24 April 1802
5	Sunday; 25 April 1802
6	Monday; 26 April 1802
7	Tuesday; 27 April 1802
8	Wednesday; 28 April 1802
9	Thursday; 29 April 1802
10	Friday; 30 April 1802

décade 23
11	Saturday; 1 May 1802
12	Sunday; 2 May 1802
13	Monday; 3 May 1802
14	Tuesday; 4 May 1802
15	Wednesday; 5 May 1802
16	Thursday; 6 May 1802
17	Friday; 7 May 1802
18	Saturday; 8 May 1802
19	Sunday; 9 May 1802
20	Monday; 10 May 1802

décade 24
21	Tuesday; 11 May 1802
22	Wednesday; 12 May 1802
23	Thursday; 13 May 1802
24	Friday; 14 May 1802
25	Saturday; 15 May 1802
26	Sunday; 16 May 1802
27	Monday; 17 May 1802
28	Tuesday; 18 May 1802
29	Wednesday; 19 May 1802
30	Thursday; 20 May 1802

Decimal time – 10 h/day
Paris
3:14:34

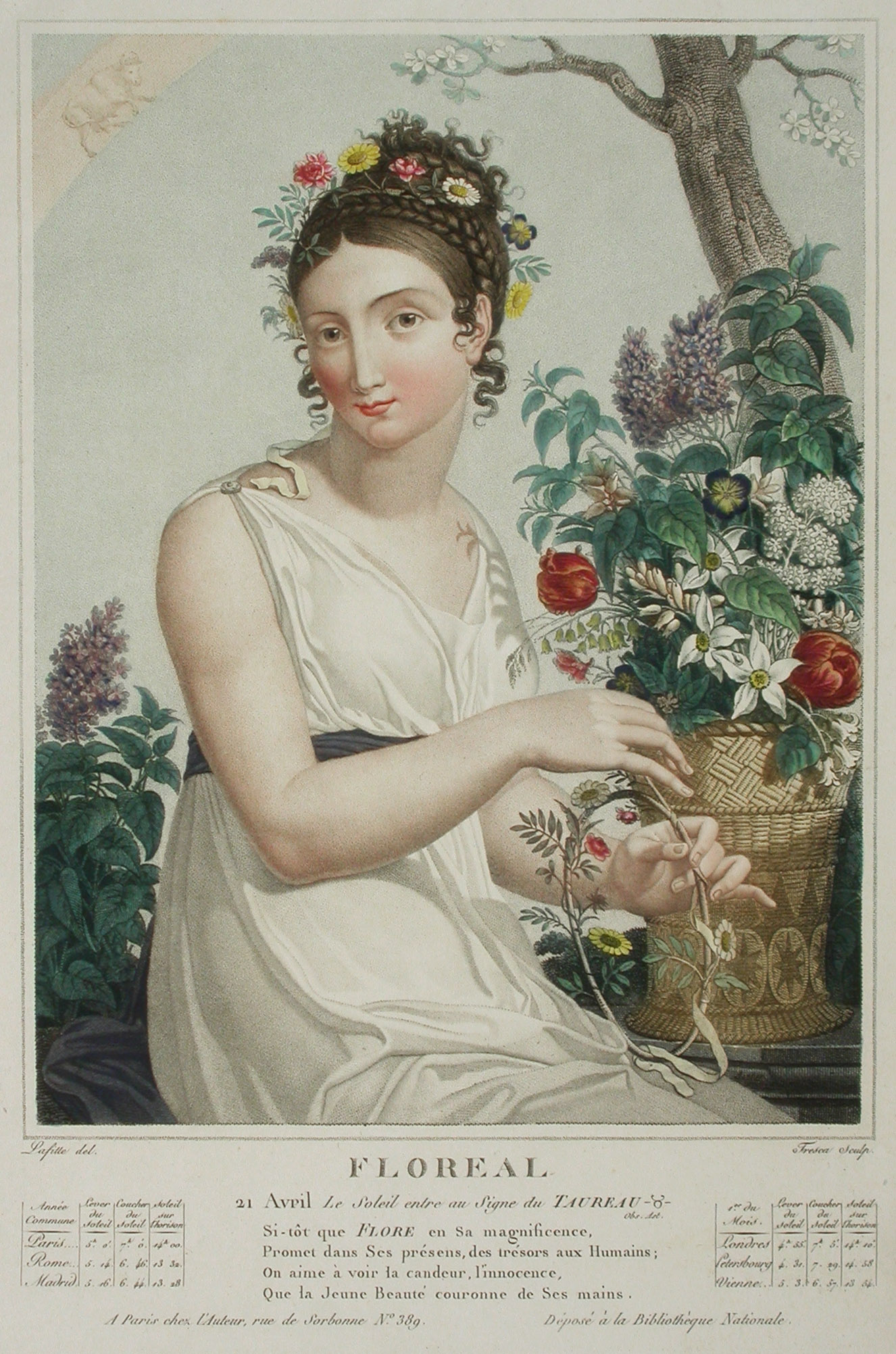
Floréal

07:32:39
Time of day - 24 h/day
Greenwich

Year: 11
Month: Floréal
Year: XI

Day of the 10-day
week (décade)
Primidi
Duodi
Tridi
Quartidi
Quintidi
Sextidi
Septidi
Octidi
Nonidi
Décadi

décade 22
1	Thursday; 21 April 1803
2	Friday; 22 April 1803
3	Saturday; 23 April 1803
4	Sunday; 24 April 1803
5	Monday; 25 April 1803
6	Tuesday; 26 April 1803
7	Wednesday; 27 April 1803
8	Thursday; 28 April 1803
9	Friday; 29 April 1803
10	Saturday; 30 April 1803

décade 23
11	Sunday; 1 May 1803
12	Monday; 2 May 1803
13	Tuesday; 3 May 1803
14	Wednesday; 4 May 1803
15	Thursday; 5 May 1803
16	Friday; 6 May 1803
17	Saturday; 7 May 1803
18	Sunday; 8 May 1803
19	Monday; 9 May 1803
20	Tuesday; 10 May 1803

décade 24
21	Wednesday; 11 May 1803
22	Thursday; 12 May 1803
23	Friday; 13 May 1803
24	Saturday; 14 May 1803
25	Sunday; 15 May 1803
26	Monday; 16 May 1803
27	Tuesday; 17 May 1803
28	Wednesday; 18 May 1803
29	Thursday; 19 May 1803
30	Friday; 20 May 1803

Decimal time – 10 h/day
Paris
3:14:34

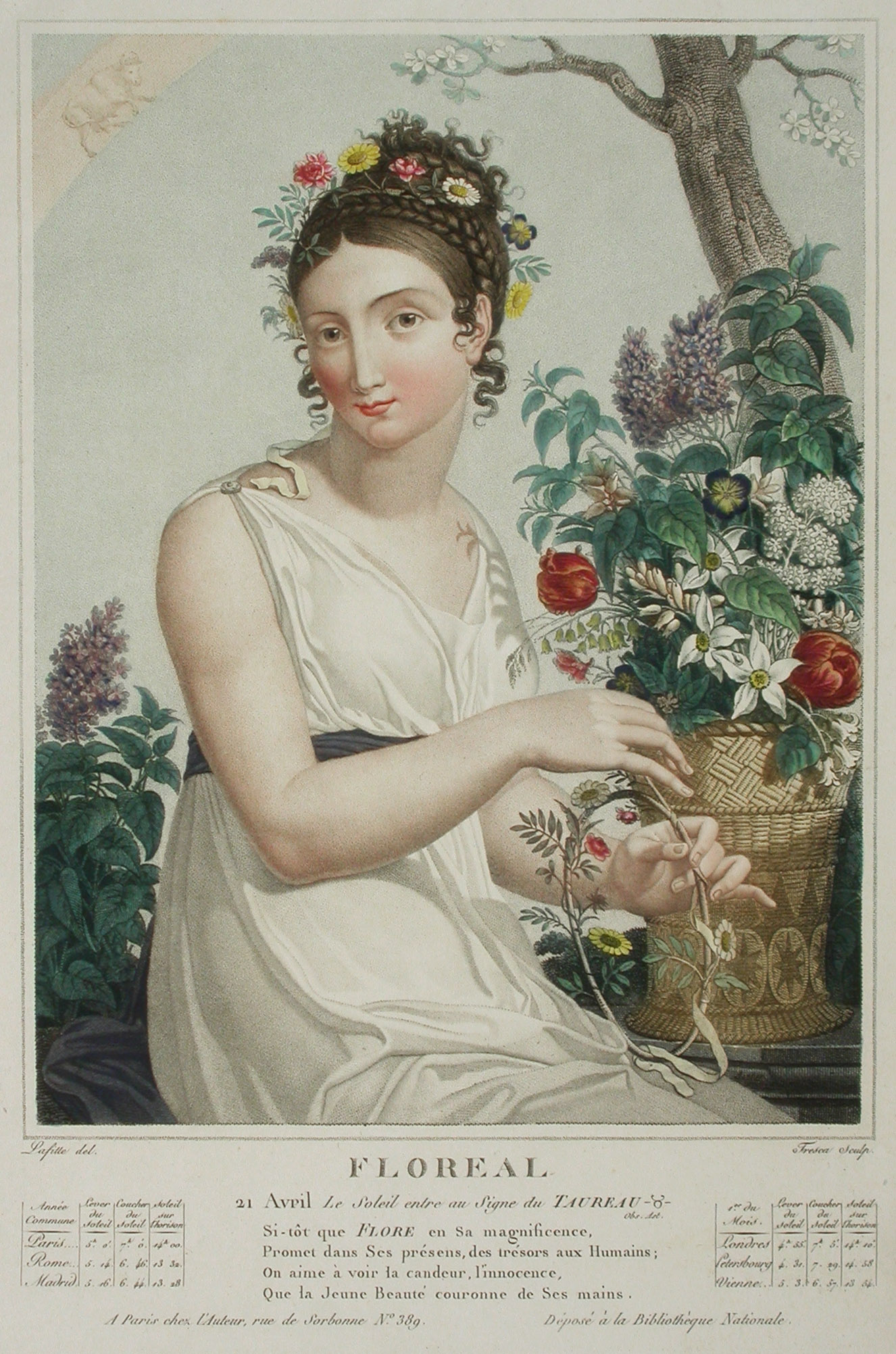
Floréal

07:32:39
Time of day - 24 h/day
Greenwich

Year: 12
Month: Floréal
Year: XII

Day of the 10-day
week (décade)
Primidi
Duodi
Tridi
Quartidi
Quintidi
Sextidi
Septidi
Octidi
Nonidi
Décadi

décade 22
1	Saturday; 21 April 1804
2	Sunday; 22 April 1804
3	Monday; 23 April 1804
4	Tuesday; 24 April 1804
5	Wednesday; 25 April 1804
6	Thursday; 26 April 1804
7	Friday; 27 April 1804
8	Saturday; 28 April 1804
9	Sunday; 29 April 1804
10	Monday; 30 April 1804

décade 23
11	Tuesday; 1 May 1804
12	Wednesday; 2 May 1804
13	Thursday; 3 May 1804
14	Friday; 4 May 1804
15	Saturday; 5 May 1804
16	Sunday; 6 May 1804
17	Monday; 7 May 1804
18	Tuesday; 8 May 1804
19	Wednesday; 9 May 1804
20	Thursday; 10 May 1804

décade 24
21	Friday; 11 May 1804
22	Saturday; 12 May 1804
23	Sunday; 13 May 1804
24	Monday; 14 May 1804
25	Tuesday; 15 May 1804
26	Wednesday; 16 May 1804
27	Thursday; 17 May 1804
28	Friday; 18 May 1804
29	Saturday; 19 May 1804
30	Sunday; 20 May 1804

Decimal time – 10 h/day
Paris
3:14:34

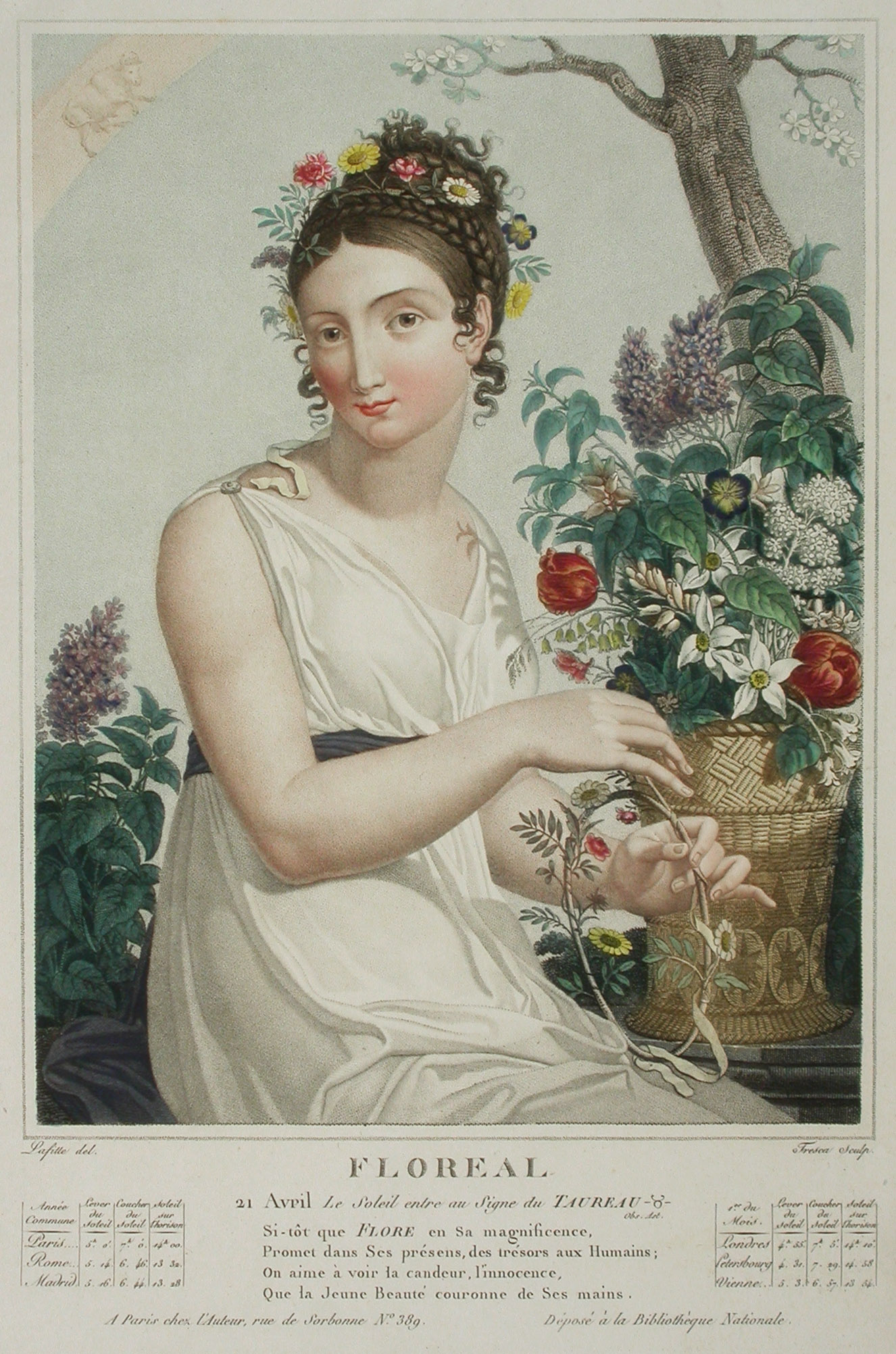
Floréal

07:32:39
Time of day - 24 h/day
Greenwich

Year: 13
Month: Floréal
Year: XIII

Day of the 10-day
week (décade)
Primidi
Duodi
Tridi
Quartidi
Quintidi
Sextidi
Septidi
Octidi
Nonidi
Décadi

décade 22
1	Sunday; 21 April 1805
2	Monday; 22 April 1805
3	Tuesday; 23 April 1805
4	Wednesday; 24 April 1805
5	Thursday; 25 April 1805
6	Friday; 26 April 1805
7	Saturday; 27 April 1805
8	Sunday; 28 April 1805
9	Monday; 29 April 1805
10	Tuesday; 30 April 1805

décade 23
11	Wednesday; 1 May 1805
12	Thursday; 2 May 1805
13	Friday; 3 May 1805
14	Saturday; 4 May 1805
15	Sunday; 5 May 1805
16	Monday; 6 May 1805
17	Tuesday; 7 May 1805
18	Wednesday; 8 May 1805
19	Thursday; 9 May 1805
20	Friday; 10 May 1805

décade 24
21	Saturday; 11 May 1805
22	Sunday; 12 May 1805
23	Monday; 13 May 1805
24	Tuesday; 14 May 1805
25	Wednesday; 15 May 1805
26	Thursday; 16 May 1805
27	Friday; 17 May 1805
28	Saturday; 18 May 1805
29	Sunday; 19 May 1805
30	Monday; 20 May 1805

Decimal time – 10 h/day
Paris
3:14:34

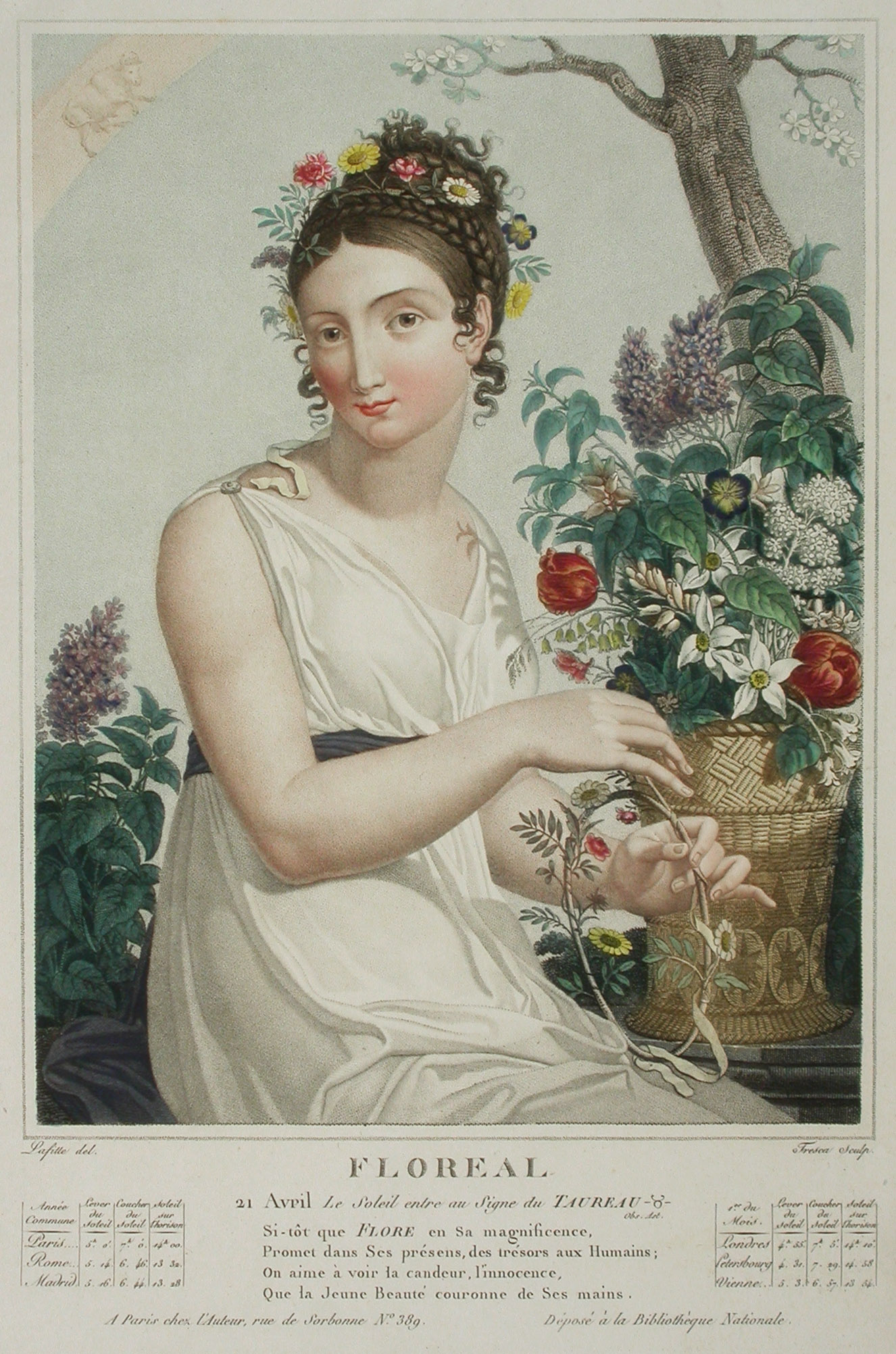
Floréal

07:32:39
Time of day - 24 h/day
Greenwich

Year: 14
Month: Floréal
Year: XIV

Day of the 10-day
week (décade)
Primidi
Duodi
Tridi
Quartidi
Quintidi
Sextidi
Septidi
Octidi
Nonidi
Décadi

décade 22
1	Monday; 21 April 1806
2	Tuesday; 22 April 1806
3	Wednesday; 23 April 1806
4	Thursday; 24 April 1806
5	Friday; 25 April 1806
6	Saturday; 26 April 1806
7	Sunday; 27 April 1806
8	Monday; 28 April 1806
9	Tuesday; 29 April 1806
10	Wednesday; 30 April 1806

décade 23
11	Thursday; 1 May 1806
12	Friday; 2 May 1806
13	Saturday; 3 May 1806
14	Sunday; 4 May 1806
15	Monday; 5 May 1806
16	Tuesday; 6 May 1806
17	Wednesday; 7 May 1806
18	Thursday; 8 May 1806
19	Friday; 9 May 1806
20	Saturday; 10 May 1806

décade 24
21	Sunday; 11 May 1806
22	Monday; 12 May 1806
23	Tuesday; 13 May 1806
24	Wednesday; 14 May 1806
25	Thursday; 15 May 1806
26	Friday; 16 May 1806
27	Saturday; 17 May 1806
28	Sunday; 18 May 1806
29	Monday; 19 May 1806
30	Tuesday; 20 May 1806

Decimal time – 10 h/day
Paris
3:14:34

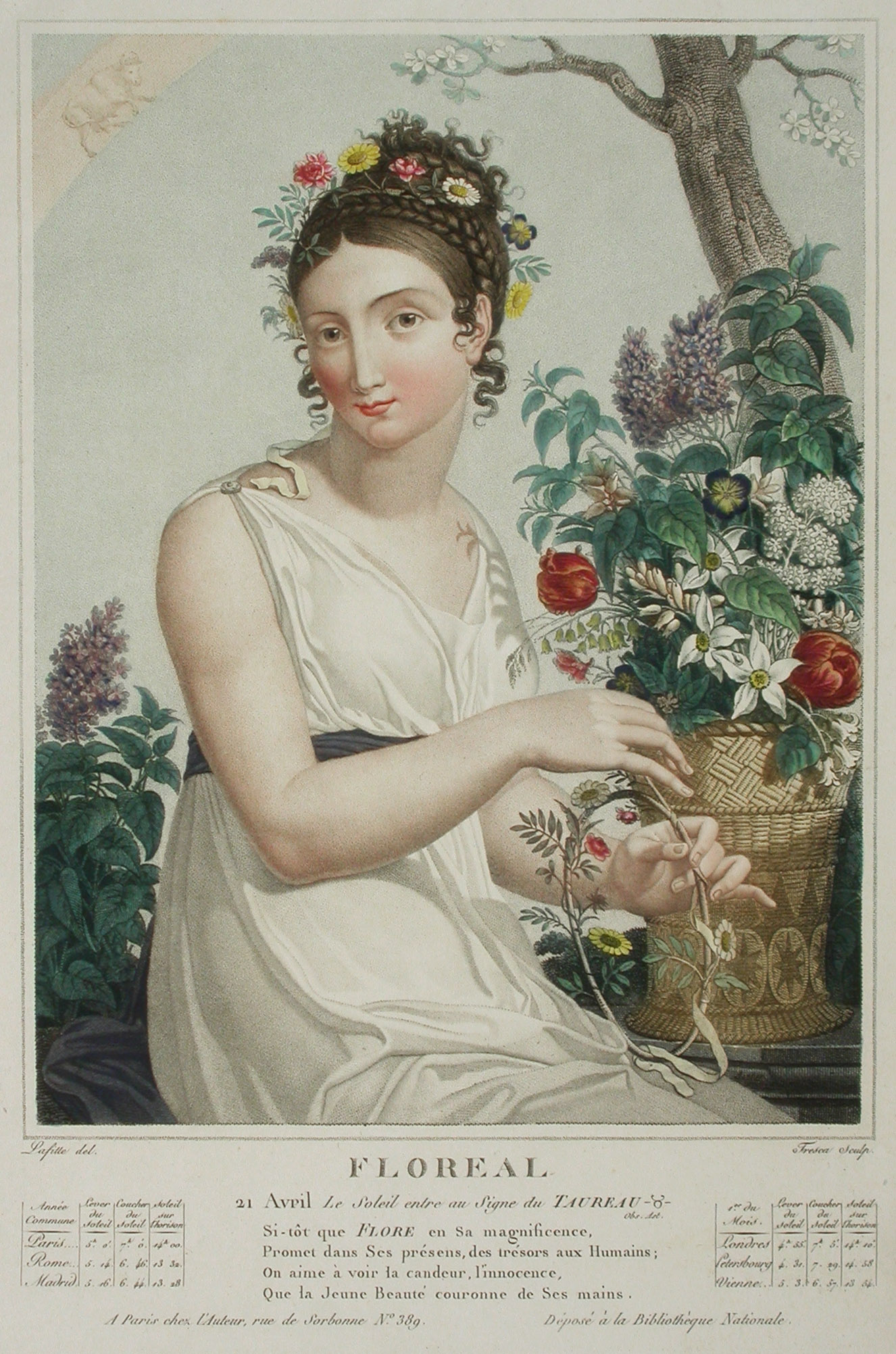
Floréal

07:32:39
Time of day - 24 h/day
Greenwich

== Day name table ==
Like all FRC months Floréal lasted 30 days and was divided into three 10-day weeks called décades (decades). Every day had the name of an agricultural plant, except the 5th (Quintidi) and 10th day (Decadi) of every decade, which had the name of a domestic animal (Quintidi) or an agricultural tool (Decadi).

	1^{re} Décade		2^{e} Décade		3^{e} Décade
Primidi	1.	Rose (Rose)	11.	Rhubarbe (Rhubarb)	21.	Statice (Sea lavender)
Duodi	2.	Chêne (Oak)	12.	Sain-foin (Sainfoin)	22.	Fritillaire (Fritillary)
Tridi	3.	Fougère (Fern)	13.	Bâton d'or (Wallflower)	23.	Bourrache (Borage)
Quartidi	4.	Aubépine (Hawthorn)	14.	Chamerisier (Dwarf Honeysuckle)	24.	Valériane (Valerian)
Quintidi	5.	Rossignol (Nightingale)	15.	Ver-à-soie (Silkworm)	25.	Carpe (Carp)
Sextidi	6.	Ancolie (Columbine)	16.	Consoude (Comfrey)	26.	Fusain (Spindle tree)
Septidi	7.	Muguet (Lily of the Valley)	17.	Pimprenelle (Burnet)	27.	Civette (Chive)
Octidi	8.	Champignon (Mushroom)	18.	Corbeil d'or (Alison)	28.	Buglose (Bugloss)
Nonidi	9.	Hyacinthe (Hyacinth)	19.	Arroche (Orache)	29.	Sénevé (Charlock)
Decadi	10.	Rateau (Rake)	20.	Sarcloir (Hoe)	30.	Houlette (Shepherd's staff)

== Conversion table ==
Table for conversion between Republican and Gregorian Calendar
for the month "Floréal"

I. / II. / III. / IV. / V. / VI. / VII.
1	2	3	4	5	6	7	8	9	10	11	12	13	14	15	16	17	18	19	20	21	22	23	24	25	26	27	28	29	30
20	21	22	23	24	25	26	27	28	29	30	1	2	3	4	5	6	7	8	9	10	11	12	13	14	15	16	17	18	19
April / 1793 / 1794 / 1795 / 1796 / 1797 / 1798 / 1799 / May

VIII. / IX. / X. / XI. / XII. / XIII.
1	2	3	4	5	6	7	8	9	10	11	12	13	14	15	16	17	18	19	20	21	22	23	24	25	26	27	28	29	30
21	22	23	24	25	26	27	28	29	30	1	2	3	4	5	6	7	8	9	10	11	12	13	14	15	16	17	18	19	20
April / 1800 / 1801 / 1802 / 1803 / 1804 / 1805 / May

== Cultural references ==
- British Sea Power reference Floréal in the chorus of Be Gone, from their album Open Season.
- Floréal-class frigate. These ships are named after the months of the French Republican calendar.
