= Maxime Vuillaume =

French engineer, journalist, member of the Paris Commune

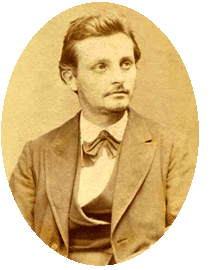
Vuillaume, 1871

Maxime Marie Abel Joseph Vuillaume (19 November 1844 – 25 November 1925), Chevalier of the Legion of Honour, was a French engineer, particularly known for his work on the Gotthard Tunnel. He was also a journalist and pamphleteer. He was involved in the Paris Commune of 1871, on the fall of which he was forced to go into exile, and later wrote several volumes of detailed memoirs of the Commune (Mes Cahiers Rouges).

== Biography ==
Vuillaume was born in Saclas, in Seine-et-Oise (now in Essonne), son of Claude Joseph Vuillaume and his wife Augustine (née Grégoire). He studied at the Collège Sainte-Barbe and the École des Mines. In his youth in Paris he frequented revolutionary circles.

In 1871 Vuillaume with Eugène Vermersch and Alphonse Humbert re-founded the newspaper Le Fils du Père Duchêne, which took its name from the journal of Jacques-René Hébert at the time of the French Revolution.

After the Bloody Week (la Semaine sanglante) in May 1871 which brought the Paris Commune to its end, he fled to Switzerland, with Eugène Protot and other communards, passing through the Jura. In 1872 he was engaged as the secretary of the entrepreneur Louis Favre, based in Altdorf in Uri. From that position during the active phase of the excavation and construction of the Saint-Gotthard tunnel he was able to observe and write about the work at close hand. By his numerous articles published in La Nature (a science review) under the pseudonym Maxime Hélène, he made generally known the progress of the works on the tunnel and the person of Louis Favre. He also published articles on explosives, which was his speciality.

In 1878, Louis Favre entrusted to him, for the requirements of the digging of the tunnel, the management of the dynamite factory set up at Varallo Pombia in Piedmont. In 1882, he became director of a new dynamite factory in Liguria. He then became director of the Société continentale des Glycérines et Dynamites, which was founded in Lyon in 1882.

He later (1887) returned to Paris, where as a journalist he wrote for various reviews including L'Aurore. He was syndic of the Association des journalistes républicains.

Vuillaume was one of the survivors of the Commune, like Victorine Brocher and Gustave Lefrançais, to bear witness to it in later years. He wrote Mes Cahiers Rouges, memoirs in 10 parts, published between 1908, with a preface by Lucien Descaves, and 1908. These memoirs are highly regarded, and Vuillaume has been described as "the best memoirist of the second half of the 19th century".

In his old age, after the death of his wife, he lived at the Fondation Galignani, an old people's home and hospice in Neuilly-sur-Seine, where he died on 25 November 1925.

== Publications ==
- La Nature, many articles on popular science under the pseudonym Maxime Hélène, 1876 to 1889
- Les galeries souterraines, as Maxime Hélène, Paris, Hachette, in the collection "La Bibliothèque des merveilles", 1876
- La poudre à canon et nouveaux corps explosifs, as Maxime Hélène, Hachette, collection "La Bibliothèque des merveilles", 1878
- Les nouvelles routes du Globe, as Maxime Hélène, G. Masson, 1882
- Le bronze, as Maxime Hélène, Paris, Hachette, collection "La Bibliothèque des merveilles", 1890
- Mes cahiers rouges (preface by Lucien Descaves), in the journal Cahiers de la Quinzaine, Paris 1908–1914. This series of 10 separate publications was not brought together in a single complete edition until that of La Découverte in 2011.
- Mes Cahiers Rouges au temps de la Commune, Paris, Librairie Paul Ollendorff, April 1910, 442 pp. This edition, which reorders the first 7 parts with variants and some omissions, and in particular extensively abridges parts IV and VII, is the one which has been used for the modern editions of 1953, 1971 and 1998.

== Sources ==
- Preface by Lucien Descaves to Mes cahiers rouges, I: Une journée a la cour martiale du Luxembourg, Cahiers de la Quinzaine, Paris 1908
- Giuseppe Del Bo, 1957: La Comune di Parigi, Milan, Feltrinelli
- Michel Cordillot (ed.), 2021: La Commune de Paris 1871. L’événement, les acteurs, les lieux, Ivry-sur-Seine, Les Éditions de l’Atelier
- B. Noël, Dictionnaire de la Commune, II, 1978, Flammarion, p. 286.
- Maitron.fr: VUILLAUME Maxime, Marie, Abel, Joseph, dit Arluison, put online 1 December 2010, most recently modified 30 June 2020
